= Selenium in biology =

Selenocysteine is the main organic molecule involving selenium in humans.

Selenium is an essential mineral micronutrient for animals, though it is toxic in large doses. In plants, it sometimes occurs in toxic amounts as forage, e.g. locoweed. Selenium is a component of the amino acids selenocysteine and selenomethionine. In humans, selenium is a trace element nutrient that functions as cofactor for glutathione peroxidases and certain forms of thioredoxin reductase. Selenium-containing proteins are produced from inorganic selenium via the intermediacy of selenophosphate (PSeO_{3}^{3−}).

== Functions in animals ==
Selenium is an essential micronutrient in mammals, but is also recognized as toxic in excess. Selenium exerts its biological functions through selenoproteins, which contain the amino acid selenocysteine. Twenty-five selenoproteins are encoded in the human genome.

=== Glutathione peroxidase ===
The glutathione peroxidase family of enzymes (abbreviated GSH-Px) catalyze reduction of hydrogen peroxide and organic hydroperoxides:

2GSH + H_{2}O_{2} → GSSG + 2 H_{2}O

The two H atoms are donated by thiols in a process that begins with oxidation of a selenol side chain in GSH-Px. The organoselenium compound ebselen is a drug used to supplement the action of GSH-Px. It functions as a catalyst for the destruction of hydrogen peroxide.

A related selenium-containing enzyme in some plants and in animals (thioredoxin reductase) generates reduced thioredoxin, a dithiol that serves as an electron source for peroxidases and also the important reducing enzyme ribonucleotide reductase that makes DNA precursors from RNA precursors.

=== Deiodinases ===
Selenium also plays a role in the functioning of the thyroid gland. It participates as a cofactor for the three thyroid hormone deiodinases. These enzymes activate and then deactivate various thyroid hormones and their metabolites. It may inhibit Hashimoto's disease, an auto-immune disease in which the body's own thyroid cells are attacked by the immune system. A reduction of 21% on TPO antibodies was reported with the dietary intake of 0.2 mg of selenium.

=== Formate dehydrogenase ===
Some microorganisms utilize selenium in formate dehydrogenase. Formate is produced in large amounts in the hepatic (liver cells) mitochondria of embryonic cells and in cancer cells by the folate cycle.

Formate is reversibly oxidized by the enzyme formate dehydrogenase:

HCO_{2}^{−} → CO_{2} + H^{+} + 2 e^{−}

=== Thioredoxin reductase ===
Thioredoxin reductase uses a cysteine-selenocysteine pair to reduce the disulfide in thioredoxin. The selenocysteine is arranged in an unusual Sec-His-Glu catalytic triad, which tunes its pKa.

== Roles in non-animals ==
Selenocysteine-containing selenoproteins are found in a wide range of organisms, though they are not universal. In other words, some forms of life do not have a requirement for selenium.

Besides the selenocysteine-containing selenoproteins, there are also some selenoproteins known from bacterial species, which have selenium bound noncovalently. Most of these proteins are thought to contain a selenide-ligand to a molybdopterin cofactor at their active sites (e.g. nicotinate dehydrogenase of Eubacterium barkeri, or xanthine dehydrogenases). Selenium is also specifically incorporated into modified bases of some bacterial tRNAs (as 5-methylaminomethyl-2-selenouridine).

Plants known as selenium hyperaccumulators are able to concentrate selenium into their aerial parts. They not only are able to tolerate high levels of selenium in their bodies, but also actively seek out selenium in soil. This is believed to work as a defense against herbivores and pathogens, as these other organisms do not have the same level of resistance to selenium toxicity. This may also have an allelopathic effect against competing plants.

== In human diet ==
=== Dietary recommendations ===
The US Institute of Medicine (IOM) updated Estimated Average Requirements (EARs) and Recommended Dietary Allowances (RDAs) for selenium in 2000. If there is not sufficient information to establish EARs and RDAs, an estimate designated Adequate Intake (AI) is used instead. The current EAR for selenium for people ages 14 and up is 45 μg/day. The RDA is 55 μg/day. RDAs are higher than EARs so as to identify amounts that will cover people with higher-than-average requirements. RDA for pregnancy is 60 μg/day. RDA for lactation is 70 μg/day. For children ages 1–13 years, the RDA increases with age from 20 to 40 μg/day. As for safety, the IOM sets Tolerable upper intake levels (ULs) for vitamins and minerals when evidence is sufficient. In the case of selenium, the UL is 400 μg/day. Collectively the EARs, RDAs, AIs and ULs are referred to as Dietary Reference Intakes (DRIs).

The European Food Safety Authority (EFSA) refers to the collective set of information as Dietary Reference Values, with Population Reference Intake (PRI) instead of RDA, and Average Requirement instead of EAR. AI and UL are defined the same as in the United States. For women and men ages 15 and older, the AI is set at 70 μg/day. AI for pregnancy is 70 μg/day; for lactation, 85 μg/day. For children ages 1–14 years, the AIs increase with age from 15 to 55 μg/day. These AIs are higher than the U.S. RDAs. The European Food Safety Authority reviewed the same safety question and set its UL at 300 μg/day, which is lower than the U.S. value.

In the United States, selenium deficiency is not common. A federal survey of food consumption determined that for women and men over the age of 19, average consumption from foods and beverages was 89 and 125 μg/day, respectively. For women and men of all ages fewer than 3% consumed less than the EAR.

==== Labeling ====
For US food and dietary supplement labeling purposes, the amount in a serving is expressed as a percent of Daily Value (%DV). For selenium labeling purposes, 100% of the Daily Value was 70 μg, but as of 27 May 2016 it was revised to 55 μg. A table of the old and new adult daily values is provided at Reference Daily Intake.

=== Food sources ===
Dietary selenium comes from nuts, cereals, meat, mushrooms, fish, and eggs. Brazil nuts are the richest ordinary dietary source and could cause selenium toxicity if consumed regularly – though the actual concentration of selenium (as with any plant-based food sources, such as another selenium-accumulating "paradise nut" Lecythis, belonging to the same family Lecythidaceae) is soil-dependent and may vary significantly by geographic location. In descending order of concentration, high levels are also found in kidney, tuna, crab, and lobster.

The human body's content of selenium is believed to be in the 13–20 milligram range.

== Toxicity and deficiency ==
There is an optimal range of selenium concentration in animals (or broadly speaking, in almost every selenium-dependent lifeform). Too much results in toxicity, too little results in deficiency.

=== Toxicity ===
Although selenium is an essential trace element, it is toxic if taken in excess. Exceeding the Tolerable Upper Intake Level of 400 micrograms per day can lead to selenosis. This 400 microgram (μg) Tolerable Upper Intake Level is based primarily on a 1986 study of five Chinese patients who exhibited overt signs of selenosis and a follow-up study on the same five people in 1992. The 1992 study actually found the maximum safe dietary Se intake to be approximately 800 micrograms per day (15 micrograms per kilogram body weight), but suggested 400 micrograms per day to not only avoid toxicity, but also to avoid creating an imbalance of nutrients in the diet and to account for data from other countries. In China, people who ingested corn grown in extremely selenium-rich stony coal (carbonaceous shale) have suffered from selenium toxicity. This coal was shown to have selenium content as high as 9.1%, the highest concentration in coal ever recorded in literature.

Symptoms of selenosis include a garlic odor on the breath, gastrointestinal disorders, hair loss, sloughing of nails, fatigue, irritability, and neurological damage. Extreme cases of selenosis can result in cirrhosis of the liver, pulmonary edema, and death. Elemental selenium and most metallic selenides have relatively low toxicities because of their low bioavailability. By contrast, selenates and selenites are very toxic, having an oxidant mode of action similar to that of arsenic trioxide. The chronic toxic dose of selenite for humans is about 2400 to 3000 micrograms of selenium per day for a long time. Hydrogen selenide is an extremely toxic, corrosive gas. Selenium also occurs in organic compounds, such as dimethyl selenide, selenomethionine, selenocysteine and methylselenocysteine, all of which have high bioavailability and are toxic in large doses.

The Occupational Safety and Health Administration (OSHA) has set the legal limit (permissible exposure limit) for selenium in the workplace at 0.2 mg/m^{3} over an 8-hour workday. The National Institute for Occupational Safety and Health (NIOSH) has set a Recommended exposure limit (REL) of 0.2 mg/m^{3} over an 8-hour workday. At levels of 1 mg/m^{3}, selenium is immediately dangerous to life and health.

==== Selenium pollution ====
Selenium pollution of water systems may result whenever new agricultural runoff courses through normally dry, undeveloped lands. This process leaches natural soluble selenium compounds (such as selenates) into the water, which may then be concentrated in new "wetlands" as the water evaporates. High selenium levels produced in this fashion have been found to have caused certain congenital disorders in wetland birds.

==== Notable cases of toxicity ====
On 19 April 2009, 21 polo ponies died shortly before a match in the United States Polo Open. Three days later, a pharmacy released a statement explaining that the horses had received an incorrect dose of one of the ingredients used in a vitamin/mineral supplement compound that had been incorrectly prepared by a compounding pharmacy. Analysis of blood levels of inorganic compounds in the supplement indicated the selenium concentrations were 10 to 15 times higher than normal in the blood samples and 15 to 20 times higher than normal in the liver samples. Selenium was later confirmed to be the toxic factor.

=== Deficiency ===
Selenium is essential for human reproduction and growth. Moderate selenium deficiency is linked to muscle weakness and muscle diseases. Mental health effects include low mood, confusion, and anxiety.

Selenium interacts with other nutrients, such as iodide and vitamin E. The interaction is observed in the etiology of many deficiency diseases in animals, and pure selenium deficiency is rare. The effect of selenium deficiency on health remains uncertain, particularly in relation to Kashin-Beck disease.

In the regions (e.g., regions within North America) where low selenium soil levels lead to low concentrations in the plants, some animal species may be deficient unless selenium is supplemented with diet or injection. Ruminants are particularly susceptible. In general, absorption of dietary selenium is lower in ruminants than in other animals and is lower in forages than in grain. Ruminants grazing certain forages, e.g., some white clover varieties containing cyanogenic glycosides, may have higher selenium requirements, presumably because cyanide is released from the aglycone by glucosidase activity in the rumen and glutathione peroxidases are deactivated by the cyanide acting on the glutathione moiety. Neonate ruminants at risk of white muscle disease may be administered both selenium and vitamin E by injection; some of the WMD myopathies respond only to selenium, some only to vitamin E, and some to either.

=== In wild animals ===
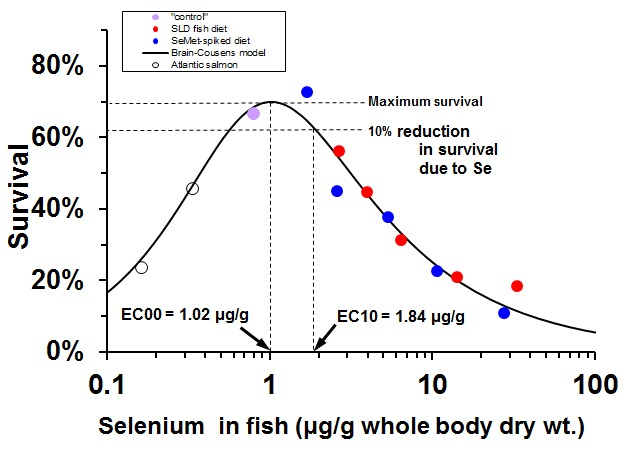
Relationship between survival of juvenile salmon and concentration of selenium in their tissues after 90 days (Chinook salmon) or 45 days (Atlantic salmon) exposure to dietary selenium. The 10% lethality level (LC10=1.84 μg/g) was derived by applying the biphasic model of Brain and Cousens to only the Chinook salmon data. The Chinook salmon data comprise two series of dietary treatments, combined here because the effects on survival are indistinguishable.

In fish and other wildlife, selenium is necessary for life but toxic in high doses. For salmon, the optimal selenium concentration is about 1 microgram selenium per gram of whole body weight. Much below that level, young salmon die from deficiency; much above, they die from toxic excess.

=== In model organisms ===
The E. coli bacterium and S. cerevisiae yeast are two model organisms commonly used for biological study. They are also used as expression systems for producing selenium-substituted proteins, which are used in a form of X-ray crystallography called single- or multi-wavelength anomalous diffraction to determine the tertiary structure of a protein. For these organisms to produce substituted proteins, they are grown in high-selenium environments, which also results in signs of toxicity. Part of this toxicity is due to the random substitution of methionine and cysteine in proteins with the selenium-containing version. Although this is the precise goal of this kind of protein production, alternation of the organism's own proteins in this way can render them nonfunctional.

== Interaction with other nutrients ==
Selenium interactes with iodine and vitamin E; see section "Deficiency" above.

Selenium interacts with other minerals, such as zinc and copper. High doses of selenium supplements in pregnant animals might disturb the zinc:copper ratio and lead to zinc reduction; in such treatment cases, zinc levels should be monitored. Further studies are needed to confirm these interactions.

== Detection ==
=== Detection in biological fluids ===
Selenium may be measured in blood, plasma, serum or urine to monitor excessive environmental or occupational exposure, confirm a diagnosis of poisoning in hospitalized victims or to assist in a forensic investigation in a case of fatal overdosage. Some analytical techniques are capable of distinguishing organic from inorganic forms of the element. Both organic and inorganic forms of selenium are largely converted to monosaccharide conjugates (selenosugars) in the body prior to being eliminated in the urine. Cancer patients receiving daily oral doses of selenothionine may achieve very high plasma and urine selenium concentrations.

=== Indicator plants ===
Certain species of plants are considered indicators of high selenium content of the soil, since they require high levels of selenium to thrive. The main selenium indicator plants are Astragalus species (including some locoweeds), prince's plume (Stanleya sp.), woody asters (Xylorhiza sp.), and false goldenweed (Oonopsis sp.)

== Medical use of synthetic selenium compounds ==
The substance loosely called selenium sulfide (with the approximate formula SeS_{2}) is the active ingredient in some anti-dandruff shampoos. The selenium compound kills the scalp fungus Malassezia, which causes shedding of dry skin fragments. The ingredient is also used in body lotions to treat Tinea versicolor due to infection by a different species of Malassezia fungus.

Several clinical trials have assessed the use of selenium supplements in critically ill adults; however, the effectiveness and potential benefits of selenium supplementation in this context is not well understood.

== Human health ==
=== Selenium in cancer ===
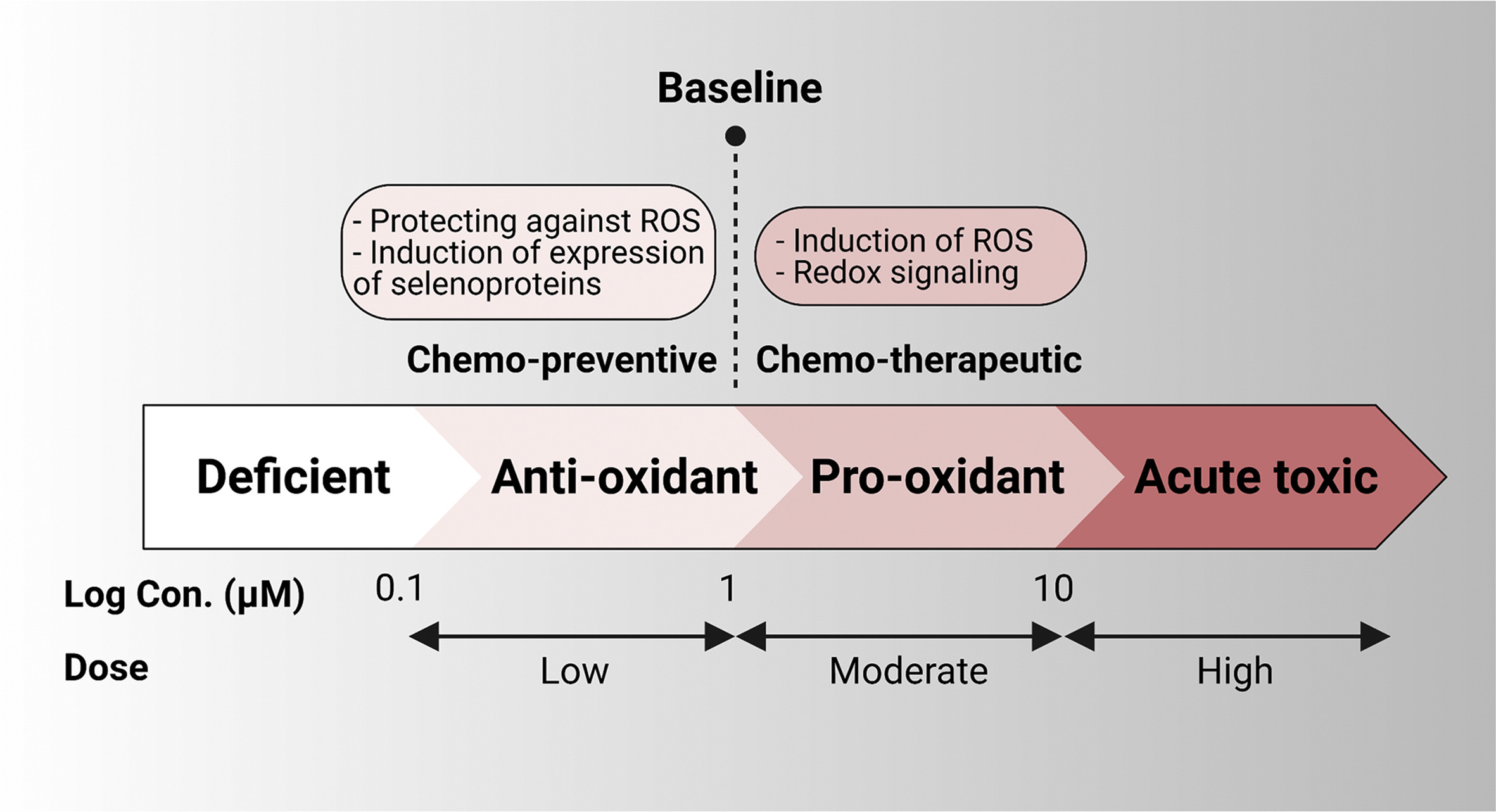
Selenium at nutritional levels is required for cell homeostasis, playing a role as an anti-oxidant through selenoproteins, thus, act chemo-preventive against cancer. In contrast, supra-nutritional levels act as pro-oxidant toxic in tumour cells.

Selenium has bimodal biological action depending on the concentration. At low nutritional doses, selenium acts as an antioxidant through selenoproteins, scavenging ROS, supporting cell survival and growth; while, at supra-nutritional higher pharmacological doses, selenium acts as a pro-oxidant generating ROS and inducing cell death. In cancer, studies have been conducted mostly on the benefits of selenium intake in reducing the risk of cancer incidence at the nutritional level; however, fewer studies have explored the effects of supra-nutritional or pharmacological doses of selenium on cancer.

"Although an inverse association between selenium exposure and the risk of some types of cancer was found in some observational studies, this cannot be taken as evidence of a causal relation, and these results should be interpreted with caution... Conflicting results including inverse, null and direct associations have been reported for some cancer types... RCTs assessing the effects of selenium supplementation on cancer risk have yielded inconsistent results... To date, no convincing evidence suggests that selenium supplements can prevent cancer in humans."

==== Selenium in anti-tumour immunity ====
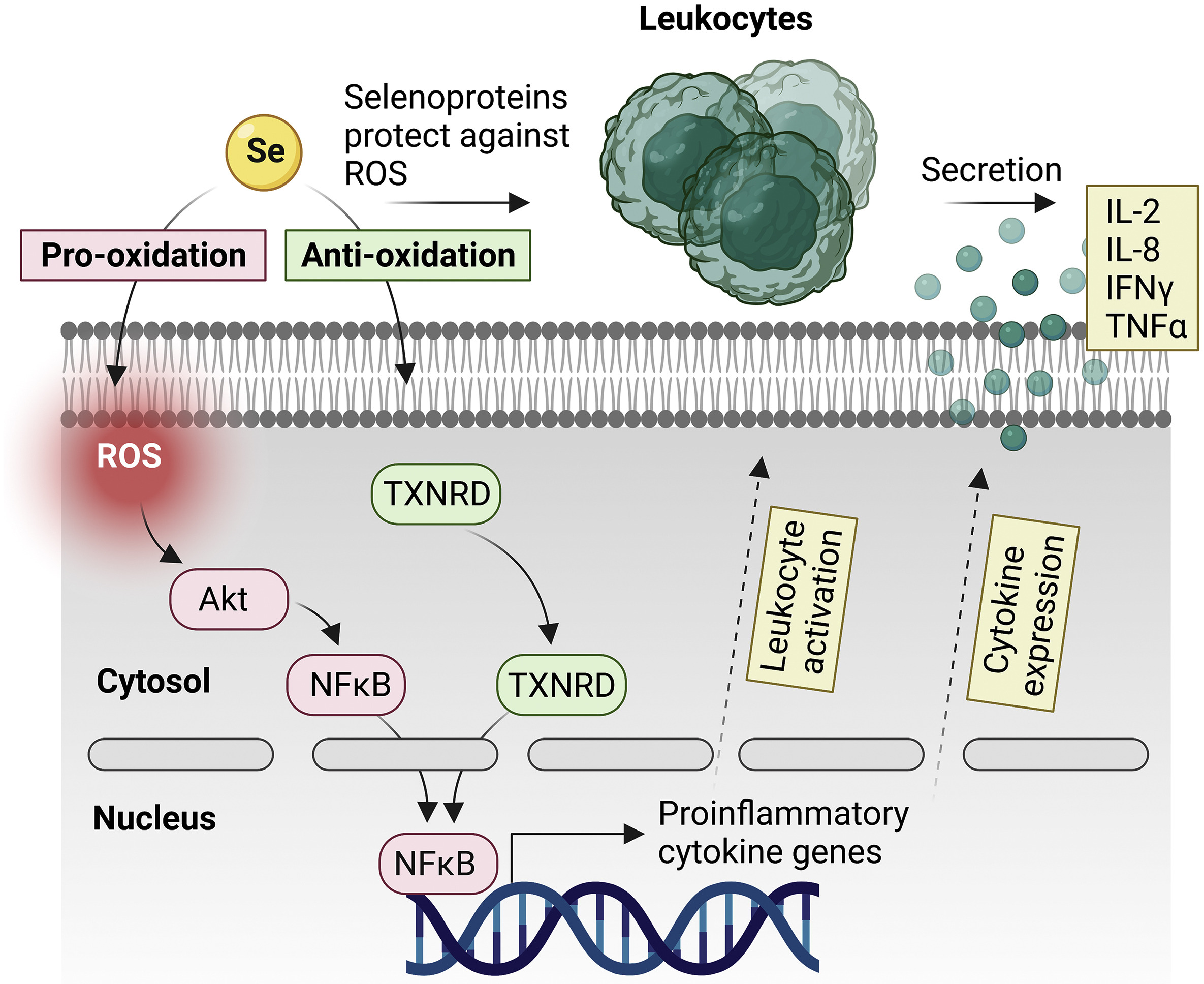
Selenium can either play a pro-oxidant role inducing ROS, activating the Akt–NF–кB pathway or play an antioxidant role through selenoprotein synthesis such as TXNRD relocating to the nucleus and activating NF-кB, resulting in further activation of leukocytes and pro-inflammatory cytokine genes.

To date, many studies have been conducted on the benefits of selenium intake in reducing the risk of cancer incidence at the nutritional level, indicating that likely selenium functions as an immunostimulator, i.e. reversing the immunosuppression in tumour microenvironment towards antitumour immunity by activating immune cells (e.g. M1 macrophages and CD8+ T-lymphocytes, the elevated number of neutrophils and activated cytotoxic NK cells) and releasing pro-inflammatory cytokines such as IFNγ and TNFα.

=== HIV/AIDS ===
AIDS appears to involve a slow and progressive decline in levels of selenium in the body. Whether this decline in selenium levels is a direct result of the replication of HIV or related more generally to the overall malabsorption of nutrients by AIDS patients remains debated. Observational studies have found an association between decreased selenium levels and poorer outcomes in patients with HIV, though these studies were mostly done prior to the currently effective treatments with highly active antiretroviral therapy (HAART). Currently there is inadequate evidence to recommend routine selenium supplementation for HIV patients, and further research is recommended.

=== Mortality ===
Selenium supplementation has no effect on overall mortality.

=== Tuberculosis ===
As with other types of supplementation, there is no good evidence selenium supplementation helps in the treatment of tuberculosis.

=== Diabetes ===
A meta-analysis of four RCTs concluded that there is no support for selenium supplementation for prevention of type 2 diabetes mellitus in Caucasians.

=== Human reproductive system ===
Abnormally high or low levels of dietary selenium can have an adverse effect on sperm quality, with a consequent lowering of fertility.

=== Mercury poisoning ===
Selenium has a protective effect towards mercury toxicity. Mercury binds to selenium with high affinity, so this metal can inhibit selenium-dependent enzymes. However, increased selenium intake can preserve the enzyme activities, reducing the adverse effects caused by mercury exposure.

== Evolution ==
=== Origin of selenoproteins ===
From about three billion years ago, prokaryotes evolved selenoprotein families centering around the selenocysteine machinery. Several selenoprotein families are known in bacteria, archaea, and eukaryotes, invariably owing to the presence of selenocysteine. They protect their host cells from oxidative damage. Selenium enzymes are involved in utilization of the small reducing molecules glutathione and thioredoxin, common intracellular antioxidants and redox partners.

Selenoprotein families of GSH-Px and the deiodinases of eukaryotic cells seem to have a bacterial phylogenetic origin. The selenocysteine-containing form occurs in species as diverse as green algae, diatoms, sea urchins, fish, and chickens.

=== Expansion and loss ===
Typical GSH-Px and superoxide dismutase enzymes requrire trace elements including selenium, vanadium, magnesium, copper, and zinc. These elements tend to be abundant in marine environments but can be lacking in some terrestrial mineral-deficient areas. Organisms have accordingly expanded or reduced their seleno-proteomes (arsenal of selenoproteins) to adapt to the situation.

As land plants adapted to the terrestrial environment from about 500 million years ago, they too faced the problem of a lack of these elements. Accordingly, most land plants do not produce selenoproteins. For their anti-oxidation needs, they slowly optimized the production of "new" endogenous antioxidants such as ascorbic acid (Vitamin C), polyphenols (including flavonoids), tocopherols, etc. A few of these appeared more recently, in the last 50–200 million years, in fruits and flowers of angiosperm plants. In fact, the angiosperms (the dominant type of plant today) and most of their antioxidant pigments evolved during the late Jurassic period.

The vertebrates of 500 million years ago were marine fishes. They opted to expand their seleno-proteomes, most notably evolving a thyroid gland with high concentration of selenium and iodine and associated systems. A group of them, the tetrapoda, later adapted to life on land but retained many of the ancestral selenoproteins. Not all selenoproteins were retained, however: the selenoprotein U contains selenocystine in fishes and chicken, but mammals (including humans) have a selenium-free version of this protein, replacing the selenocystine with cysteine (human genes PRXL2A, PRXL2B, PRXL2C). Another example is the human GPX5 and rodent GPX6, both of which have a vestigial SECIS element pointing clearly to a selenocystine past.

== See also ==
- Biology and pharmacology of chemical elements
- Antioxidant – Compound that inhibits the oxidation of other molecules
- Action potential – Neuron communication by electric impulses
- Calcium in biology
- Iodine in biology
- Magnesium in biology
- Membrane potential – Electric potential difference between interior and exterior of a biological cell
- Potassium in biology
- Selenium yeast – Selenium-enriched yeast extract sold as animal fodder additive
- Sodium in biology
- SEPP1 – Protein found in humans
