= List of types of malnutrition =

List of types of malnutrition or list of nutritional disorders include diseases that results from excessive or inadequate intake of food and nutrients.

== Overnutrition ==
=== Metabolic ===
Obesity is caused by eating too many calories compared to the amount of exercise the individual is performing, causing a distorted energy balance. It can lead to diseases such as cardiovascular disease and diabetes. Obesity is a condition in which the natural energy reserve, stored in the fatty tissue of humans and other mammals, is increased to a point where it is associated with certain health conditions or increased mortality.

The low-cost food that is generally affordable to the poor in affluent nations is low in nutritional value and high in fats, sugars and additives. In rich countries, therefore, obesity is often a sign of poverty and malnutrition while in poorer countries obesity is more associated with wealth and good nutrition. Other non-nutritional causes for obesity included: sleep deprivation, stress, lack of exercise, and heredity.

Acute overeating can also be a symptom of an eating disorder.

Goitrogenic foods can cause goitres by interfering with iodine uptake.

=== Vitamins and micronutrients ===
Vitamin poisoning is the condition of overly high storage levels of vitamins, which can lead to toxic symptoms. The medical names of the different conditions are derived from the vitamin involved: an excess of vitamin A, for example, is called "hypervitaminosis A".

Iron overload disorders are diseases caused by the overaccumulation of iron in the body. Organs commonly affected are the liver, heart and endocrine glands in the mouth.

== Deficiencies ==
=== Proteins/fats/carbohydrates ===
- Protein malnutrition
  - Kwashiorkor
  - Marasmus

=== Dietary minerals ===
- Calcium
  - Osteoporosis
  - Rickets
  - Tetany
- Iodine deficiency
  - Goiter
- Selenium deficiency
  - Keshan disease
- Iron deficiency
  - Iron deficiency anemia
- Zinc
  - Growth retardation

=== Dietary vitamins ===
- Thiamine (Vitamin B_{1})
  - Beriberi
- Niacin (Vitamin B_{3})
  - Pellagra
- Cobalamin (Vitamin B_{12})
  - Vitamin B_{12} deficiency anemia, and irreversible neurological changes
- Vitamin C
  - Scurvy
- Vitamin D
  - Osteoporosis
  - Rickets
- Vitamin A
  - Night Blindness
- Vitamin K
  - Haemophilia
