= Mao Qingguo =

Former Chinese business executive

- 茆庆国
- Born: May 1953 (age 73); Lianyungang, Jiangsu, China
- Occupation: Executive
- Agent: China National Salt Industry Corporation
- Political party: Chinese Communist Party (1977–2019; expelled)

Chinese name
- Traditional Chinese: 茆慶國
- Simplified Chinese: 茆庆国
Transcriptions
Standard Mandarin
- Hanyu Pinyin: Máo Qìngguó

Mao Qingguo (Chinese: 茆庆国; born May 1953) is a former Chinese business executive who served as chairman of the board of China National Salt Industry Corporation, China's state-owned salt monopoly, from March 2013 to his retirement in August 2014. Prior to that, he also served as its Party secretary from April 2011 to March 2013 and general manager from December 2003 to April 2011.

== Early life ==
Mao was born in Lianyungang, Jiangsu in May 1953.

== Career ==
He entered the workforce in September 1969, and joined the Chinese Communist Party in January 1977. In January 1998 he was director of Jiangsu Salt Administration and chairman of Jiangsu Salt Industry Company. He served as deputy general manager of China National Salt Industry Corporation in December 2001, and two years later promoted to the General Manager position. In March 2013 he was promoted again to become chairman of the board, but having held the position for only a year and a half, when he retired in August 2014. In October 2014 he became director of China Salt Industry Association.

== Investigation ==
On April 19, 2019, he has come under investigation for "serious legal violations and criminal offenses" by the Central Commission for Discipline Inspection (CCDI), the party's internal disciplinary body, and the National Supervisory Commission, the highest anti-corruption agency of China. On October 18, 2019, he was expelled from the Chinese Communist Party. Prosecutors signed an arrest order for him on November 5. On December 24, he was indicted on suspicion of accepting bribes.

On June 30, 2020, he stood trial at the Intermediate People's Court of Liu'an on charges of taking bribes. According to the indictment, he used his various positions between 1997 and 2019 in Jiangsu to seek benefits for relevant organizations and individuals in project cooperation, bond underwriting, job promotion and other matters and in return, he illegally accepted money and goods worth 72.03 million yuan, 10,000 US dollars and 10,000 euros either directly or via his family members or from other connections.

On January 7, 2021, he was sentenced to 15 years and fined 6 million yuan for taking bribes.

== Award ==
In June 2008 he was listed among the fifth group of "The Top 10 Chinese Economic Talents".
