= Keshan disease =

- Specialty: Cardiology
- Symptoms: Cardiac arrhythmia, dizziness, fast breathing, shortness of breath
- Causes: Selenium deficiency, Coxsackie virus B3

Keshan disease is a congestive cardiomyopathy caused by a combination of dietary deficiency of selenium and the presence of a mutated strain of Coxsackievirus, named after Keshan County of Heilongjiang province, Northeast China, where symptoms were first noted. These symptoms were later found prevalent in a wide belt extending from northeast to southwest China, all due to selenium-deficient soil. The disease peaked in 1960–1970, killing thousands of people.

Often fatal, the disease affects children and women of child-bearing age, characterized by heart failure and pulmonary edema. Over decades, supplementation with selenium reduced this condition.

It had been linked to the Coxsackie B virus, specifically the B3 serotype. Current research suggests that the lack of selenium results in a more virulent strain of the coxsackievirus becoming the dominant viral species present in the population of virus, but the mechanism of this selection event is unclear. Mutations in genes (SEPHS2, SCN5A, GPX-1, ALAD) are linked to family-clusters of the disease.

Keshan disease can also lead to higher rates of cancer, cardiovascular disease, hypertension, and strokes. In addition, an individual can experience eczema, psoriasis, arthritis, cataracts, alcoholism, and infections.

== Signs and symptoms ==
There are four main types of Keshan disease: acute, subacute, chronic, and latent.

Some signs and symptoms of acute Keshan disease include dizziness, malaise, nausea, chills, loss of appetite, projectile vomiting, pallor, low arterial blood pressure (less than 80/60 mmHg), dyspnea, precardiac (anterior to the heart) or substernal (behind or below the sternum) discomfort, cardiogenic shock, and constricted veins in one's extremities.

Some signs and symptoms of subacute Keshan disease include malaise, restlessness, gallop rhythm, facial edema, heart dilation, and cardiac shock.

Some signs and symptoms of chronic Keshan disease include palpitations, dyspnea, cough (with blood), pain in one's right upper quadrant, edema, oliguria, enlargement of the heart, systolic murmur, gallop rhythm, and hepatomegaly.

Some signs and symptoms of latent Keshan disease include dizziness, fatigue, palpitations, and mild enlargement of the heart.

== Treatments ==
One main treatment for Keshan disease is selenium supplementation. The recommended amounts are fifty-five micrograms of selenium per day for adult men and women, sixty micrograms a day for women during pregnancy and seventy micrograms per day for women after pregnancy. A doctor may insist that if a man is sexually active, he may have to take up to seventy micrograms of selenium per day. A doctor may also recommend that the individual take vitamin E; selenium and vitamin E are medically linked and seem to work together. An individual will most likely be prescribed selenium supplements (in the form of selenomethionine) or have injections of this mineral. Selenium is useful both for preventing the disease and for increasing survival rates among those with the disease.

An individual will also be advised to have a diet that includes seafood, meats such as kidney, and liver, and some grains and seeds; all of these are high in selenium. Brewer's yeast and wheat germ both contain high levels of selenium. Garlic, onions, mushroom, broccoli, tomatoes, radishes, and Swiss chard may be good sources of selenium if the soil in which they are grown contains it. An individual will have to be monitored once they begin to take the selenium supplements, due to the fact that too much of it can cause balding, intestinal distress, weakness, and slow mental functioning. Individuals in China with the disease treat it with a herb called Astragalus, which accumulates selenium from the soil.

Standard cardiological medication such as diuretics, beta-blockers, angiotensin receptor blockers (ARBs), and angiotensin-converting enzyme inhibitors are used to manage the cardiological consequences of Keshan disease. Cardiac surgery (implants, stents or full heart transplant) may be advised in serious cases.

Other recommendations for managing Keshan disease are to avoid alcohol, monitor side effects to medications, and increase sleep.

== Animal models ==
Aspects of Keshan disease have been successfully replicated in selenium-deficient mice infected with coxsackievirus B3. Compared to mice that consume sufficient selenium and are exposed to the same pathogen, these mice show higher viral titers in the heart, suggesting a weakening of the immune response.

Gpx-1 knockout mice on a normal diet exhibit myocarditis when exposed to coxsackievirus B3, suggesting that selenium deficiency may precipitate the disease by reducing the activity of GPX-1.

=== Viral mutation ===
When a benign strain of coxsackievirus B3 infects selenium-deficient mice, it acquires mutations that cause it to produce heart problems in selenium-sufficient mice, suggesting that the selenium-deficient environment causes genetic mutations in the virus. When this strain was sequenced, it was found to have 6 out of 7 mutations (compared to the benign ancestor) shared with existing cardiovirluent strains.

Nucleotide and amino acid changes between benign, mutant, and existing cardiovirluent strains
Nucleotide	Virus region	Benign CVB3/0	Mutant virluent CVB3/0(Se-)	Existing virluent CVB3/M1 and CVB3/20
234	5' NTR	C	T	T
788	1A	G Arg	A Gly	A Gly
2271	1C	A Phe	T Tyr	T Tyr
2438	1C	G Gln	T Glu	T Glu
2690	1D	G	G	A
3324	2A	C Val	T Ala	T Ala
7334	3' NTR	C	T	T

Partial sequences of Keshan-related B3 strains extracted from human cadavers show an identical mutation at nucleotide number 234 in the 5' NTR). Other work has determined that cardiovirluence is determined by this change in 5' NTR, which has major effects on RNA transcription efficiency in mouse heart cells.

== See also ==
- Selenium deficiency
- Kashin–Beck disease
