= Selenium deficiency =

- Selenium
- Specialty: Endocrinology
- Causes: compromised intestinal function

Selenium deficiency occurs when an organism lacks the required levels of selenium, a critical nutrient in many species. Deficiency, although relatively rare in healthy well-nourished individuals, can have significant negative results, affecting the health of the heart and the nervous system; contributing to depression, anxiety, and dementia; and interfering with reproduction and gestation.

== Signs and symptoms ==
Selenium deficiency in combination with Coxsackievirus infection can lead to Keshan disease, which is potentially fatal. Selenium deficiency also contributes (along with iodine deficiency) to Kashin-Beck disease. The primary symptom of Keshan disease is myocardial necrosis, leading to the weakening of the heart. Kashin-Beck disease results in atrophy, degeneration, and necrosis of cartilage tissue. Keshan disease also makes the body more susceptible to illness caused by other nutritional, biochemical, or infectious diseases.

Selenium is also necessary for the conversion of the thyroid hormone thyroxine (T4) into its more active counterpart triiodothyronine (T3), and as such a deficiency can cause symptoms of hypothyroidism, including extreme fatigue, mental slowing, goiter, cretinism, and recurrent miscarriage.

== Causes ==
It can occur in patients with severely compromised intestinal function, those undergoing total parenteral nutrition, those who have had gastrointestinal bypass surgery, and also in persons of advanced age (i.e., over 90).

People dependent on food grown from selenium-deficient soil may be at risk for deficiency. Increased risk for developing various diseases has also been noted, even when certain individuals lack optimal amounts of selenium, but not enough to be classified as deficient.

For some time now, it has been reported in the medical literature that a pattern of side effects possibly associated with cholesterol-lowering drugs (e.g., statins) may resemble the pathology of selenium deficiency.

== Diagnosis ==
=== Reference ranges ===
The European Food Safety Authority (EFSA) recommends a dietary allowance of 70 μg per day selenium intake for adults. In the US, the Dietary Reference Intake for adults is 55 μg/day. In the UK it is 75 μg/day for adult males and 60 μg/day for adult females. The 55 μg/day recommendation is based on the full expression of plasma glutathione peroxidase. Selenoprotein P is a better indicator of selenium nutritional status, and full expression of it would require more than 66 μg/day.

== Epidemiology and prevention ==
Selenium deficiency is uncommon, but regions in China, Europe, Russia, and New Zealand have low selenium levels in croplands and diet. The worldwide prevalence of selenium deficiency is however predicted to rise under climate change due to the loss of selenium from croplands. These diseases are most common in certain parts of China where the intake is low because the soil is extremely deficient in selenium. Studies in Jiangsu Province of China have indicated a reduction in the prevalence of these diseases by taking selenium supplements. In Finland, selenium salts are added to chemical fertilizers, as a way to increase selenium in soils. Dietary supplements may utilize sodium selenite, L-selenomethionine, or selenium-enriched yeast.

== In animals ==
In some regions (e.g. much of the northeastern and northwestern US and adjacent Canada, and the southeastern US), selenium deficiency in some animal species is common unless supplementation is carried out. Selenium deficiency is responsible (either alone or together with vitamin E deficiency) for many of the cases of WMD ("white muscle disease"), evidenced at slaughter or during necropsy by the whitish appearance of striated muscle tissue due to bleaching by peroxides and hydroperoxides. Although this degenerative disease can occur in foals, pigs, and other animal species, ruminants are particularly susceptible. In general, absorption of dietary selenium is lower in ruminants than in non-ruminants and lower from forages than from grain. Sheep are more susceptible than cattle to WMD, and goats are more susceptible than sheep. Because of selenium's role in certain peroxidases (converting hydroperoxides to alcohols) and because of the antioxidant role of vitamin E (preventing hydroperoxide formation), a low level of Se can be somewhat (but not wholly) compensated by a high level of vitamin E. (In the animal, localization of peroxidases and vitamin E differs, partly because of the fat-solubility of vitamin E.) Some studies have indicated that about 0.12 or 0.23 mg Se per kg of dry matter intake may be sufficient for avoiding Se deficiency in sheep. However, a somewhat higher Se intake may be required to avoid WMD where certain legumes are consumed. The cyanogenic glycosides in some white clover (Trifolium repens) varieties may influence the Se requirement, presumably because of cyanide from the aglycone released by glucosidase activity in the rumen and inactivation of glutathione peroxidases by the effect of absorbed cyanide on the glutathione moiety.

In areas where selenium deficiency in livestock is a concern, selenium (as selenite) may be supplemented in feed. Certain countries, e.g., the US and Canada, regulate such supplementation. Neonate ruminants at risk of WMD may be administered both Se and vitamin E by injection; some of the WMD myopathies respond only to Se, some only to vitamin E, and some to either.
