= Nutrient deficiency =

Nutrient deficiency may refer to:

- Malnutrition, a condition in animals that results from a diet deficient in calories and/or essential nutrients
- Micronutrient deficiency, a lack of one or more of the micronutrients required for plant or animal health
  - Avitaminosis, any disease caused by chronic or long-term vitamin deficiency or caused by a defect in metabolic conversion
  - Mineral deficiency, a lack of dietary minerals that are needed for an organism's proper health
