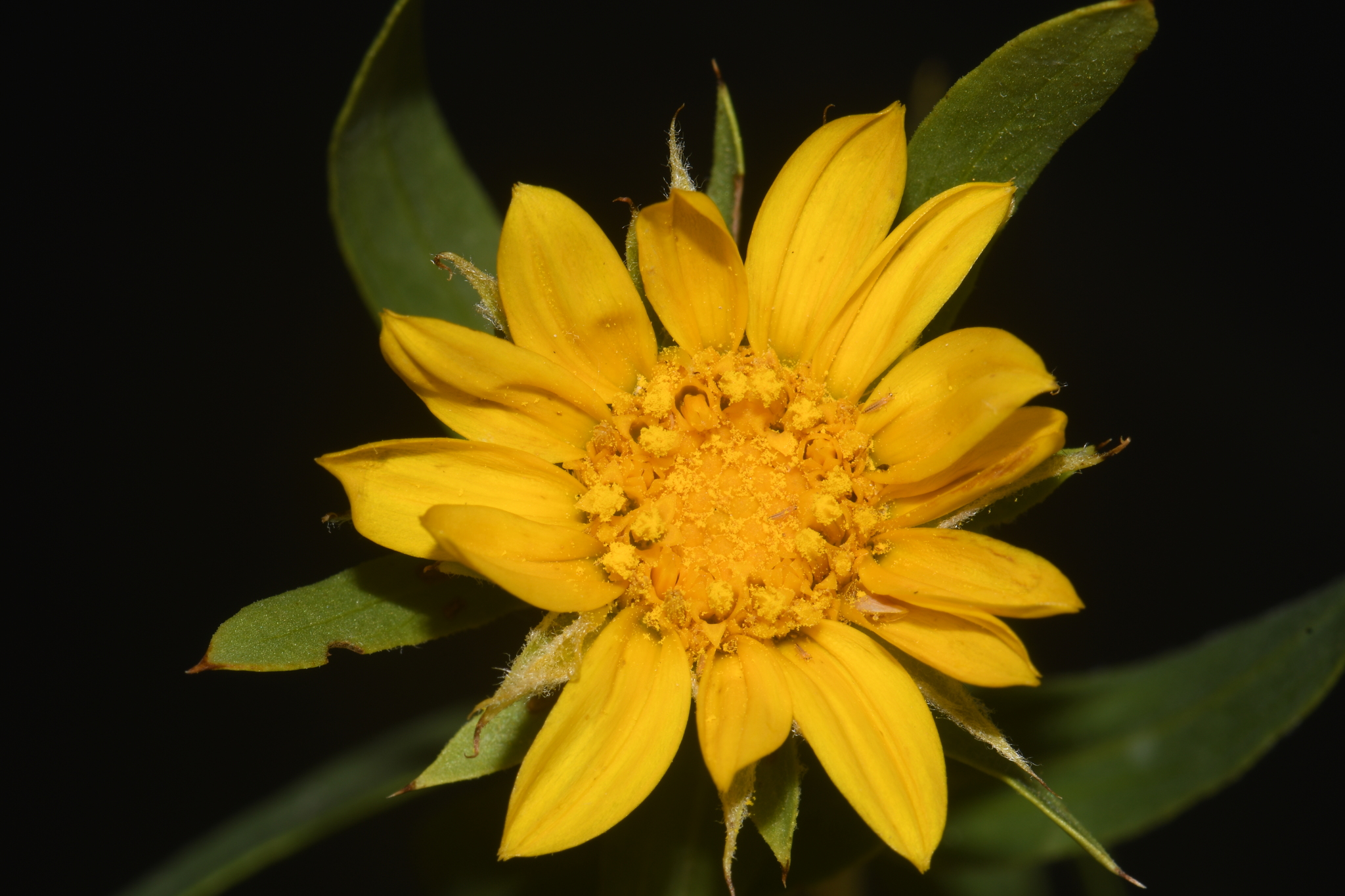

Conservation status
- Apparently Secure (NatureServe)

Scientific classification
- Kingdom: Plantae
- Clade: Tracheophytes
- Clade: Angiosperms
- Clade: Eudicots
- Clade: Asterids
- Order: Asterales
- Family: Asteraceae
- Genus: Oonopsis
- Species: O. foliosa

Binomial name
- Oonopsis foliosa (A.Gray) Greene

= Oonopsis foliosa =

Species of flowering plant

Oonopsis foliosa is a species of flowering plant in the family Asteraceae known by the common name leafy false goldenweed. It is native to Wyoming and Colorado in the United States, where it occurs in the Rocky Mountain foothills and the edges of the Great Plains.

This plant is a perennial herb growing from a woody taproot and branching caudex and growing up to 40 centimeters tall. The leaves are lance-shaped to oblong and up to 10 centimeters long by 1.5 wide. The flower heads contain many disc florets. One variety, var. foliosa, has ray florets. The other variety, var. monocephala, has none. The two varieties hybridize. Flowering occurs in June through August.

This plant grows on shortgrass prairies.

The rare var. monocephala is endemic to Las Animas County, Colorado. It occurs on grassland and shrubland. It can be found on the Piñon Canyon Maneuver Site. The plant is adapted to a pattern of erosion that historically was caused by herds of bison. Today it thrives in eroded conditions caused by tanks on the army base.
