= Selenium yeast =

Selenium-enriched yeast extract sold as animal fodder additive

Selenium yeast is Saccharomyces cerevisiae (baker's yeast) grown in a selenium-rich media. It contains selenium in the form of organic and inorganic compounds. It is used both as a feed additive for livestock and as a dietary supplement for humans. It is approved in the US, EU, and the UK. Because selenium yeast can be patented, its producers can demand premium prices.

The other source of selenium is inorganic selenium in the form of pure chemicals. Forms used in animal feed include sodium selenate and sodium selenite. These too are effective in supplying selenium to the livestock.

The main claimed benefit of selenium yeast is that it contains organic selenium, mainly in the form of selenomethionine and selenocystine-containing proteins. Because these organic chemicals are also found in common natural sources of selenium such as wheat, it is claimed that they are more easily absorbed by animals including humans. Unfortunately, there is considerable variability in products described as "selenium yeast", specifically in the selenium compounds found within. Many products on the market are simply mixtures of largely inorganic selenium and some yeast, which defeats the point of using selenium yeast.

== Molecular biology ==
Inorganic selenium-containing ions enter the cell using special transporter proteins. Inside of the yeast cell, the selenium is reduced to selenide. Yeast lacks the machinery for the biosynthesis of selenoproteins, unlike mammals. It appears that yeast produce organoselenium compounds using promiscuous enzymes that do not effectively distinguish between selenium and sulfur. Selenide first becomes homoselenocysteine. On one branch of the pathway, homoselenocysteine is converted to selenomethionine, Se-adenosyl selenomethionine, Se-adenosyl-homoselenocysteine and back to homoselenocysteine (the seleno version of the S-adenosyl methionine cycle). On the other branch, homoselenocysteine is converted to selenocystathionine, then selenocystine, Se-methylselenocysteine, and γ-glutamyl-Se-methylselenocysteine. Selenomethionine and selenocystine can be randomly incorporated into proteins in lieu of the regular amino acid. The net effect is that the yeast converts inorganic selenium into organic selenium stored in its body.

High concentration of the noncanonical substrate (selenide) leads to higher selenium concentrations within limits. The selenium accumulator plant Astragalus bisulcatus has a more selective version of the cystine-tRNA ligase that reduces the chances of misincorporation of selenocystine when put in yeast. This genetic modification is, however, not expected to be used in selenium yeast as a food ingredient, but for use in the production of designer proteins in biotechnology.

== Animal feed additive ==
Although selenium is toxic in large amounts, selenium is an essential element. The European Food Safety Authority does allow the use of selenomethionine as a feed additive for animals. The EU allows up to 300 micrograms of selenium per day, but one long-term study of selenium supplementation showed no evidence of toxicity at a dose as high as 800 micrograms per day.

Dietary supplementation using selenium yeast is ineffective in the production of antioxidants in bovine milk compared to inorganic selenium (sodium selenate). One study examined if increased selenium in the diet of mutant mice (via a selenium yeast product) caused a higher production of selenium-containing enzymes which have an antioxidant effect. The effect was modest.

Selenium supplementation in yeast form has been shown to increase pig selenium-containing antioxidant enzymes, broiler growth and meat quality, the shelf life of turkey and rooster semen, and possibly cattle fertility.

Selenium supplementation in animal feeds may be profitable for agribusinesses. It may be possible to market selenium-fortified foods to consumers as functional foods, such as selenium-enriched eggs, meat, or milk.

== Specific products ==
=== Sel-Plex ===
A patented cultivar of yeast (Saccharomyces cerevisiae 'CNCM I-3060') marketed as Sel-Plex has been approved for use in animal fodder:

- U.S. Food and Drug Administration approval for use as a supplement to feed for chickens, turkeys, swine, goats, sheep, horses, dogs, bison, and beef and dairy cows.
- Organic Materials Review Institute approval for use as a feed supplement for all animal species.
- As of 2006, the European Food Safety Authority's Scientific Panel on Additives and Products or Substances used in Animal Feed allows the use of Sel-Plex in animal fodder for poultry, swine, and bovines, as the selenium is not significantly bio-accumulated by the human consumer.

== Precautions ==
Only a small amount should be used when blending animal feeds. An excess of selenium, specifically at 10× the European authorized maximum selenium intake of Sel-Plex, causes a drop in animal productivity.

Appropriate measures to minimize inhalation exposure to the product should be taken.

== Analytical chemistry ==
Total selenium in selenium yeast can be reliably determined using open acid digestion to extract selenium from the yeast matrix followed by flame atomic absorption spectrometry. Determination of the selenium species selenomethionine can be achieved via proteolytic digestion of selenium yeast followed by high-performance liquid chromatography with inductively coupled plasma mass spectrometry.

== See also ==
Nutritional muscular dystrophy
