= Prostamide/prostaglandin F2alpha synthase =

Identifiers
- EC no.: 1.11.1.20

Databases
- BRENDA: enzyme data
- ExPASy: NiceZyme view
- KEGG: enzyme entry
- MetaCyc: metabolic pathway
- Rhea: reactions
- PDB structures: RCSB PDB PDBe PDBsum
Search
- PMC: articles
- PubMed: articles
- NCBI: proteins

Prostamide/prostaglandin F2alpha synthase (EC 1.11.1.20, prostamide/PGF synthase, prostamide F synthase, prostamide/prostaglandin F synthase, tPGF synthase) is an enzyme which in humans is encoded by the gene PRXL2B. Its systematic name is thioredoxin:(5Z,9alpha,11alpha,13E,15S)-9,11-epidioxy-15-hydroxy-prosta-5,13-dienoate oxidoreductase . This enzyme catalyses the following chemical reaction

thioredoxin +
prostaglandin H2
thioredoxin
disulfide
+
prostaglandin F2alpha

This enzyme uses thioredoxin as a reducing agent to convert peroxides to diols.
