= Selenomethionine =

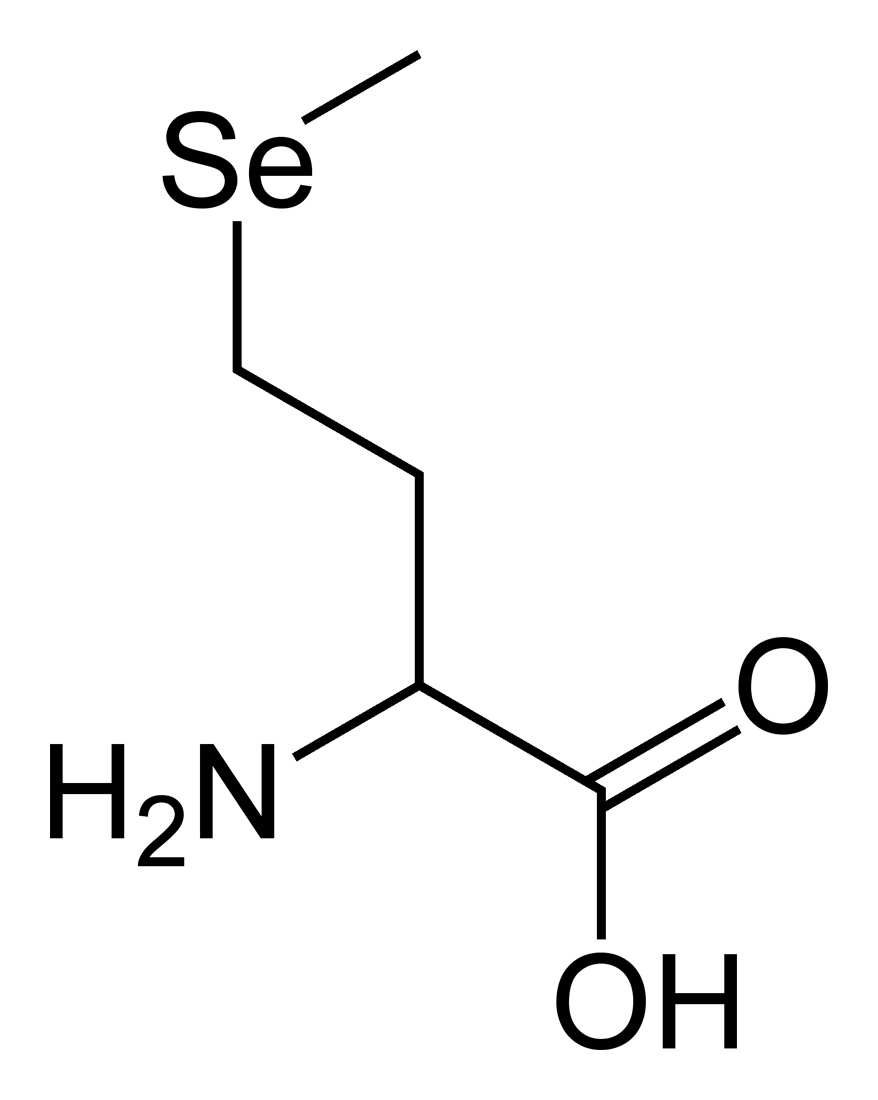
Selenomethionine: chemical structure
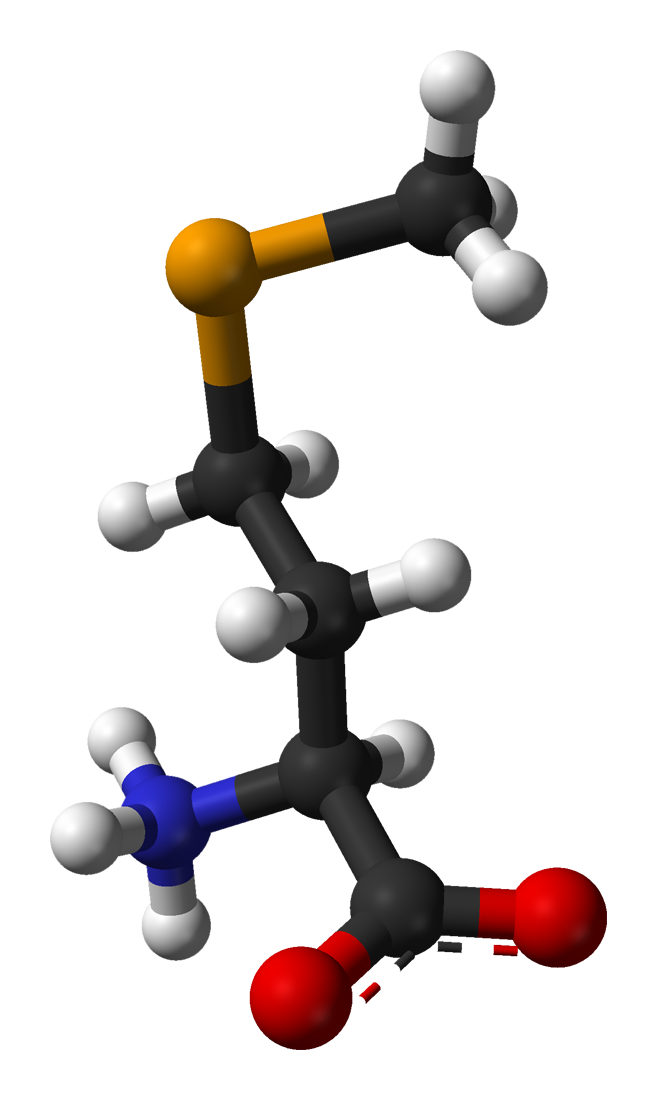

Names
- IUPAC name 2-Amino-4-(methylselanyl)butanoic acid
- Other names MSE

Identifiers
CAS Number	3211-76-5 (L); 1464-42-2 (D/L)
3D model (JSmol)	Interactive image
ChEBI	CHEBI:27585
ChemSpider	14375
ECHA InfoCard	100.014.525
PubChem CID	15103
UNII	964MRK2PEL (L); J9V40V4PKZ (D/L)
CompTox Dashboard (EPA)	DTXSID7040609
- InChI: InChI=1S/C5H11NO2Se/c1-9-3-2-4(6)5(7)8/h4H,2-3,6H2,1H3,(H,7,8) Key: RJFAYQIBOAGBLC-UHFFFAOYSA-N
- SMILES: C[Se]CCC(C(=O)O)N

Properties
Chemical formula	C_{5}H_{11}NO_{2}Se
Molar mass	196.106 g/mol
- Except where otherwise noted, data are given for materials in their standard state (at 25 °C [77 °F], 100 kPa). verify (what is ?) Infobox references

Selenomethionine (SeMet) is a naturally occurring amino acid. The L-selenomethionine enantiomer is the main form of selenium found in Brazil nuts, cereal grains, soybeans, and grassland legumes, while Se-methylselenocysteine, or its γ-glutamyl derivative, is the major form of selenium found in Astragalus, Allium, and Brassica species. In vivo, selenomethionine is randomly incorporated instead of methionine. Selenomethionine is readily oxidized.

Selenomethionine's antioxidant activity arises from its ability to deplete reactive oxygen species. Selenium and methionine also play separate roles in the formation and recycling of glutathione, a key endogenous antioxidant in many organisms, including humans.

== In proteins ==
Selenium and sulfur are chalcogens that share many chemical properties so the substitution of methionine with selenomethionine may have only a limited effect on protein structure and function. Indeed, bacteria can tolerate a very high amount of substitution of this kind.

=== Alkali disease ===
However, the incorporation of selenomethionine into tissue proteins and keratin in cattle, birds, and fish causes alkali disease. Alkali disease is characterized by emaciation, loss of hair, deformation and shedding of hooves, loss of vitality, and erosion of the joints of long bones.

=== Structure determination ===
Incorporation of selenomethionine into proteins in place of methionine aids the structure elucidation of proteins by X-ray crystallography using single- or multi-wavelength anomalous diffraction (SAD or MAD). The incorporation of heavy atoms such as selenium helps solve the phase problem in X-ray crystallography. Incorporation is achieved with the help of a selenomethionine-tolerant microbial expression system: the recombinant DNA for the protein in question is put into a microbe, which is then given large amounts of selenomethionine.

== Other biology ==
Yeast grown under high concentrations of selenomethionine is able to convert selenomethionine into selenocysteine, much like methionine can be converted into cystine. Existence of selenocysteine is enough to trick the cystine-tRNA ligase into producing a tRNA^{Cys} linked to selenocystine, resulting in the production of non-functional proteins and cytotoxicity.

== Dietary intake ==
As mentioned before, selenomethionine occurs in the human diet. It is one of the main forms of selenium in food along with selenocystine.

Selenomethionine is readily available as a dietary supplement. It has been suggested by nutritionists that selenomethionine, as an organic form of selenium, is easier for the human body to absorb than selenite, which is an inorganic form. It was determined in a clinical trial that selenomethionine is absorbed 19% better than selenite.

== See also ==
- Selenocysteine, another selenium-containing amino acid, but one that is incorporated into specific locations of specific proteins as directed by the genetic code.
- Selenoprotein
- Canadian Reference Material of selenomethionine
