= China National Salt Industry Corporation =

State-owned enterprise of China

China National Salt Industry Group Co., Ltd. 中国盐业集团有限公司
- Logo as it appears on consumer salt packaging

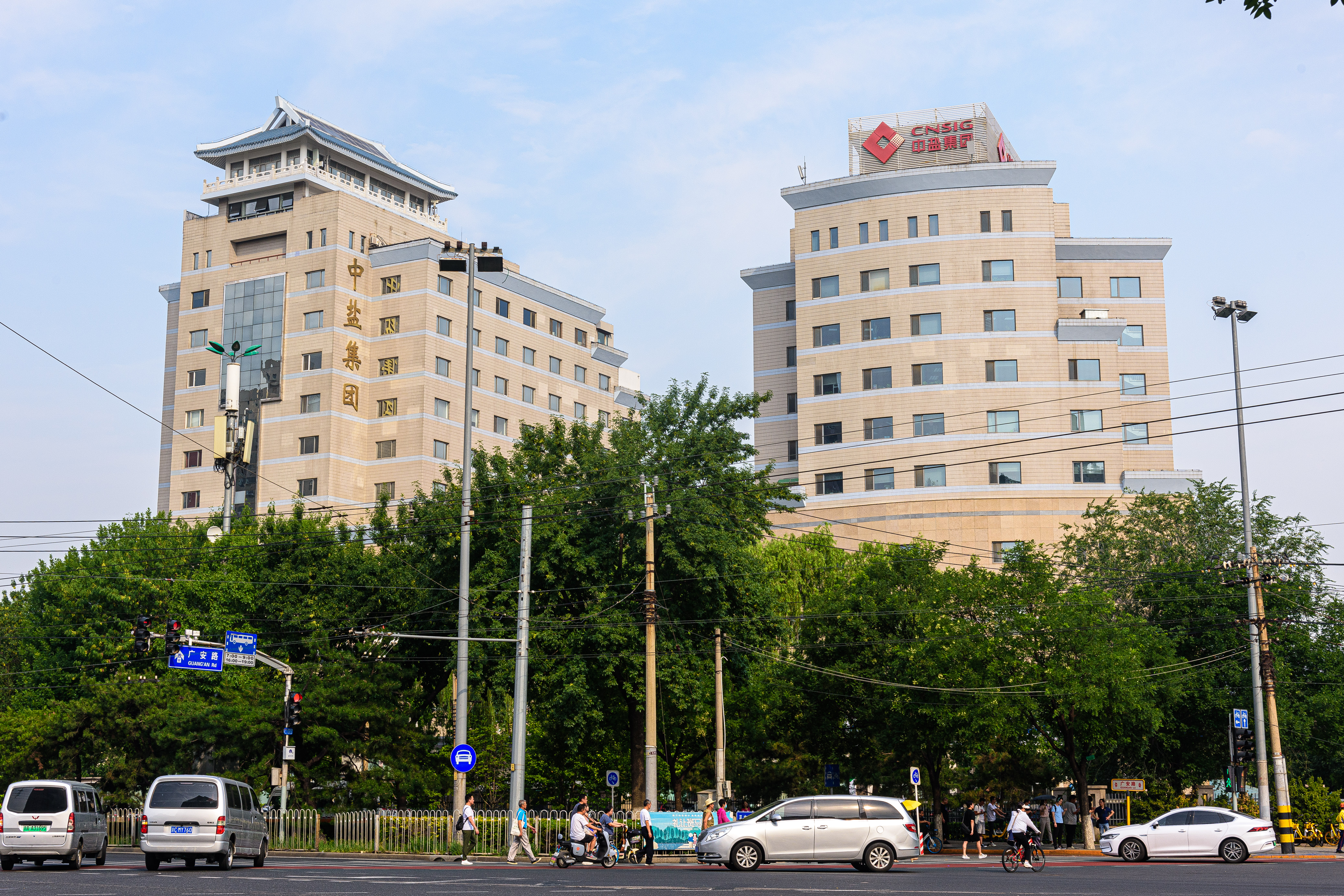
- CNSIG headquarters
- Company type: State-owned enterprise
- Industry: Edible salts
- Founded: Beijing, China (1950)
- Headquarters: Guangwai Street, Fengtai District, Beijing, China
- Key people: Mao Qingguo (Chairman); Du Maohua (Party Secretary)
- Products: Iodized table salt, salt products
- Revenue: ▲CN¥28.41 billion (2011)
- Net income: ▲CN¥720 million (2011)
- Total assets: ▲CN¥44.19 billion (2011)
- Owner: Chinese central government
- Number of employees: 48,476 (2011)
- Website: www.chinasalt.com.cn

China National Salt Industry Corporation (Chinese: 中国盐业总公司; pinyin: Zhōngguó yán yè zǒng gōngsī), abbreviated as China Salt (Chinese: 中盐; pinyin: zhōng yán), is a state-owned enterprise of China which controls a monopoly over the management and production of edible salt. The company employs 48,476 workers, and controls assets worth 44.19 billion yuan (US $7 billion) as of 2011.

China Salt's subsidiary, China National Salt Industry Co., Ltd. is a joint-stock company with limited liabilities, which would be the SPV to list most of the assets of the group on stock exchange.

== Background ==
Within the history of China, every dynasty instituted a salt monopoly system, originally intended mainly for taxation purposes. Since salt was an essential and irreplaceable commodity used in everyday life, and therefore was viable as a stable source of government revenue, various historical rulers employed a salt monopoly which forbade the production and sales of salt by commoners. The practice of monopolizing salt began during the rule of Emperor Wu of Han, and during the Tang dynasty, income obtained from salt taxes by the salt commission accounted for greater than half the government revenue; during the Yuan dynasty, this figure reached 80%. With the founding of the People's Republic of China in 1949, the practice of state monopolization of salt persisted; the salt tax continued to form a significant proportion of government revenue, representing 5.49% of the total national tax in 1950, however with a shift in economic development, this has diminished to 0.04% in 2006.

Founded in February 1950 and formerly known as the China National Salt Industry Company (中国盐业公司), China Salt controls a nationwide government monopoly over the salt industry in China. In 2003, administration of the government-controlled enterprise was shifted and placed under the management of the State-owned Assets Supervision and Administration Commission of the State Council of the People's Republic of China. A law titled "Regulation on the Management of the Salt Industry" (盐业管理条例) dictates that salt cannot be sold across different regions, and that private citizens are forbidden from selling their own manufactured salt, meaning that the management of salt is controlled by the state.

In 2011, table salt production in China reached 81.98 million tons, making it the largest salt producing country in the world, and a significant increase over 18 million tons produced in 1987, and 40 million tons in 2000. This increase was in part due to development of salt manufacture from mineral and lake sources. However, despite high production figures, salt prices remain expensive in China as a result of the salt monopoly; whilst average salt consumption as a percentage of personal income in the United States, France and Australia are 0.06%, 0.04% and 0.04% respectively, this value is 0.12% in China.

== Management ==
The pricing of salt is set uniformly at a national level by China Salt, which centrally makes all decisions regarding market pricing. All legally manufactured table salt is branded as "China Salt" before shipments are transported and sold on the retail market. Salt producers have no decision-making powers in regards to sales and production, and only follow the directive of China Salt. As a result, there is no market competition amongst salt producers and a significant lack in product diversity. China Salt serves as both the operating company and the entity responsible for formulating administrative policy, having complete control over salt production standards.

Iodine deficiency is a recognized problem in the western, southern, and eastern regions of the country, which historically did not derive their salt from ocean water. China Salt is responsible for the iodization of edible table salt in China, where legal salt producers manufacture iodized salt in accordance with the requirements of China Salt. Since the monopoly is the sole provider of iodized salt, consumers have no choice over how much iodine they consume, which has led to health problems relating to iodine overdose; there have been noted increases in reported cases of thyroid cancer in China during 2013. As of 2014, table salt on the Chinese market contains approximately 20–50 mg of iodine per kilogram.

== Contemporary issues ==
There have been numerous calls for the salt monopoly to be broken up and privatized. It is argued that a salt monopoly can no longer be justified, as the basis for its existence to protect national economic interests no longer exist, and that it harms consumers.

On 8 March 2013, Taobao was forced to remove all listings of salt from its online marketplace, since it violated the law forbidding sale of salt across regions. Private businesses that violate salt regulations are fined and have their salt products seized. One such case occurred in Chongqing in 2013, where 90 tons of illegally manufactured industrial salt intended for sale as edible salt in Hubei, Sichuan, Shanxi, Shandong and Henan was confiscated by authorities, with a total street market value of 4 million yuan. Because China Salt controls the country's salt mines and wet salt farms whilst selling at expensive prices, various companies manufacturing food products such as soy sauce and food seasonings have resorted to the illegal use of industrial salt created by artificial manufacture in efforts to reduce costs, at the risk of being caught and fined.
