= Iodine deficiency in China =

Health issue in China

Iodine deficiency is a widespread problem in western, southern and eastern parts of China, as their iodized salt intake level is much lower than the average national level. Iodine deficiency is a range of disorders that affect many different populations. It is estimated that IDDs affect between 800 million and 2 billion people worldwide; countries have spent millions of dollars in implementing iodized salt as a means to counteract the iodine deficiencies prevalent today. With China accounting for "40% of the total population", it bears a large portion of those who are iodine deficient.

Iodine is a micronutrient the body needs to properly produce thyroid hormones. The human body is not able to produce it, and iodine is an essential nutrient. Iodine is not readily available in many foods, thus making it difficult for many people to obtain it. One particular source, found in great supply, is ocean water although it is not an effective dietary source. Iodine deficiency diseases (IDDs) are able to develop before birth, so it is crucial for all populations to have sufficient levels of the micronutrient and prevent such diseases from developing early on.

== The Chinese government and iodine regulations ==
The Chinese government implemented a program of regulating salt to contain iodine starting in 1995. A more recent study has confirmed that the availability of iodized salt in the provinces has increased since this date. Today, about one third of the Chinese population is living in areas with low concentrations of iodine in their water supply. Salt is available in China for less than the retail price in some other countries, at about 5 cents, and is consumed regularly in most diets. This is very cost effective for producers who now must abide by the iodized salt regulations and those for those who need to consume it. The black market, however, is laden with the non-iodized counterpart and partially accounts for the population still be fairly saturated with IDDs.

== Implementations of solutions ==
The levels of iodized salt were measured in a urinalysis of households in China. It was confirmed that about 15–25 mg/kg of iodized salt content in the diet was sufficient in preventing IDDs and preventing side effects of over consumption. In provinces where people are consuming less than this amount, there is an increased amount of improper brain development in children. Furthermore, one can see the relation between the importance of iodine in thyroid hormones and the IDD goitre. This disease causes a swelling in the neck, where the thyroid glands are, leading to impaired cognitive abilities. The child population was about 20% saturated with the disease but continues to decrease with the new initiatives.

Another common IDD prevalent in China is Kashin-Beck disease. A particular outbreak in Tibet was recorded as occurring from lack of iodine. Kashin-Beck is a bone deformity endemic. Iodine deficiency, hypothyroidism, and low serum concentrations of thyroxine-binding globulin were significantly related to Kashin–Beck disease. Iodine supplemented irrigation water in combination to iodized salt helps in reducing the neonatal and infant mortality rates. The province of Xinjiang suffers severely from IDDs and in 1993, started the use of potassium iodate in combination with irrigation water. Irrigation water is widely used and accessible to all households making it the predominant solution in reducing micronutrient deficiencies for Xinjiang.

== See also ==
- Kashin-Beck disease
- Malnutrition
- Iodine
