= PRXL2B =

Protein-coding gene in humans

Identifiers
- Aliases: PRXL2B, C1orf93, family with sequence similarity 213 member B, peroxiredoxin like 2B, FAM213B
- External IDs: MGI: 1913719; GeneCards: PRXL2B
Enzyme activity
EC #	BRENDA	ExPASy	KEGG	MetaCyc
1.11.1.20	↗	↗	↗	↗

Gene location (Human)
Chr.	Chromosome 1 (human)
Band	1p36.32	Start	2,586,491 bp
Band	1p36.32	End	2,591,469 bp

Gene location (Mouse)
Chr.	Chromosome 4 (mouse)
Band	4|4 E2	Start	154,979,961 bp
Band	4|4 E2	End	154,983,592 bp
RNA expression pattern
Bgee	Human / Mouse (ortholog); Top expressed in: mucosa of transverse colon; anterior cingulate cortex; right frontal lobe; dorsolateral prefrontal cortex; prefrontal cortex; superior frontal gyrus; duodenum; Brodmann area 9; hypothalamus; temporal lobe / Top expressed in: olfactory epithelium; triceps brachii muscle; facial motor nucleus; interventricular septum; sternocleidomastoid muscle; temporal muscle; vastus lateralis muscle; skeletal muscle tissue; digastric muscle; intestinal villus; More reference expression data
BioGPS	n/a
Gene ontology
Molecular function	oxidoreductase activity, acting on the CH-OH group of donors, NAD or NADP as acceptor; oxidoreductase activity; prostaglandin-F synthase activity; antioxidant activity
Cellular component	cytoplasm; myelin sheath; cytosol; extracellular exosome; endoplasmic reticulum
Biological process	prostaglandin metabolic process; prostaglandin biosynthetic process; fatty acid biosynthetic process; fatty acid metabolic process; lipid metabolism; cellular oxidant detoxification
Sources:Amigo / QuickGO
Orthologs
Databases	NCBI: entry; OMA: entry
Species	Human	Mouse
Entrez	127281	66469
Ensembl	ENSG00000275125; ENSG00000157870	ENSMUSG00000029059
UniProt	Q8TBF2	Q9DB60
RefSeq (mRNA)	NM_001195736; NM_001195737; NM_001195738; NM_001195740; NM_001195741 NM_152371	NM_025582
RefSeq (protein)	NP_001182665; NP_001182666; NP_001182667; NP_001182669; NP_001182670 NP_689584	NP_079858
Location (UCSC)	Chr 1: 2.59 – 2.59 Mb	Chr 4: 154.98 – 154.98 Mb
PubMed search
- Wikidata
View/Edit Human	View/Edit Mouse

PRXL2B is a gene found in humans that encodes the enzyme prostamide/prostaglandin F synthase (EC 1.11.1.20). Like prostaglandin F synthase (encoded by the gene AKR1C3), PRXL2B produces the labor inducing hormone prostaglandin F2alpha, but differs from AKR1C3 in the substrates it uses to produce it. PRXL2B catalyzes the following reaction:

thioredoxin +
prostaglandin H2
thioredoxin
disulfide
+
prostaglandin F2alpha

while, AKR1C3 instead uses prostaglandin D2 and NADPH (EC 1.11.1.188).
