= Selenium =

Selenium, _{34}Se
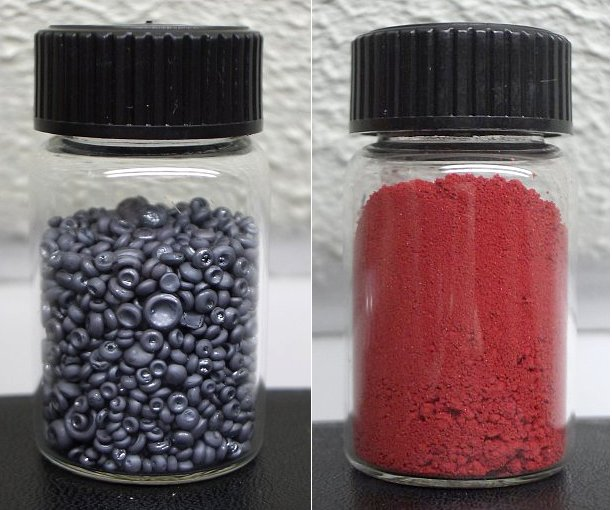

Selenium
- Pronunciation: /səˈliːniəm/ (sə-LEE-nee-əm)
- Appearance: grey metallic-looking, red, and vitreous black (not pictured) allotropes

Standard atomic weight A_{r}°(Se)
- 78.971±0.008; 78.971±0.008 (abridged)

Selenium in the periodic table
| Hydrogen | | | | | | | | | | | | | | | | | | | | | | | | | | | | | | | Helium |
| Lithium | Beryllium | | | | | | | | | | | | | | | | | | | | | | | | | Boron | Carbon | Nitrogen | Oxygen | Fluorine | Neon |
| Sodium | Magnesium | | | | | | | | | | | | | | | | | | | | | | | | | Aluminium | Silicon | Phosphorus | Sulfur | Chlorine | Argon |
| Potassium | Calcium | | | | | | | | | | | | | | | Scandium | Titanium | Vanadium | Chromium | Manganese | Iron | Cobalt | Nickel | Copper | Zinc | Gallium | Germanium | Arsenic | Selenium | Bromine | Krypton |
| Rubidium | Strontium | | | | | | | | | | | | | | | Yttrium | Zirconium | Niobium | Molybdenum | Technetium | Ruthenium | Rhodium | Palladium | Silver | Cadmium | Indium | Tin | Antimony | Tellurium | Iodine | Xenon |
| Caesium | Barium | Lanthanum | Cerium | Praseodymium | Neodymium | Promethium | Samarium | Europium | Gadolinium | Terbium | Dysprosium | Holmium | Erbium | Thulium | Ytterbium | Lutetium | Hafnium | Tantalum | Tungsten | Rhenium | Osmium | Iridium | Platinum | Gold | Mercury (element) | Thallium | Lead | Bismuth | Polonium | Astatine | Radon |
| Francium | Radium | Actinium | Thorium | Protactinium | Uranium | Neptunium | Plutonium | Americium | Curium | Berkelium | Californium | Einsteinium | Fermium | Mendelevium | Nobelium | Lawrencium | Rutherfordium | Dubnium | Seaborgium | Bohrium | Hassium | Meitnerium | Darmstadtium | Roentgenium | Copernicium | Nihonium | Flerovium | Moscovium | Livermorium | Tennessine | Oganesson |
S
↑
Se
↓
Te
arsenic ← selenium → bromine
- Atomic number (Z): 34
- Group: group 16 (chalcogens)
- Period: period 4
- Block: p-block
- Electron configuration: [Ar] 3d^{10} 4s^{2} 4p^{4}
- Electrons per shell: 2, 8, 18, 6

Physical properties
- Phase at STP: solid
- Melting point: 494 K (220.85 °C, 429.53 °F)
- Boiling point: 958 K (685 °C, 1265 °F)
- Density (near r.t.): gray: 4.81 g/cm^{3} alpha: 4.39 g/cm^{3} vitreous: 4.28 g/cm^{3}
- when liquid (at m.p.): 3.99 g/cm^{3}
- Critical point: 1766 K, 27.2 MPa
- Heat of fusion: gray: 6.69 kJ/mol
- Heat of vaporization: 95.48 kJ/mol
- Molar heat capacity: 25.363 J/(mol·K)
- Specific heat capacity: 321.169 J/(kg·K)
Vapor pressure
| P (Pa) | 1 | 10 | 100 | 1 k | 10 k | 100 k |
|---|---|---|---|---|---|---|
| at T (K) | 500 | 552 | 617 | 704 | 813 | 958 |

Atomic properties
- Oxidation states: common: −2, +2, +4, +6 −1, 0, +1, +3, +5
- Electronegativity: Pauling scale: 2.55
- Ionization energies: 1st: 941.0 kJ/mol; 2nd: 2045 kJ/mol; 3rd: 2973.7 kJ/mol
- Atomic radius: empirical: 120 pm
- Covalent radius: 120±4 pm
- Van der Waals radius: 190 pm
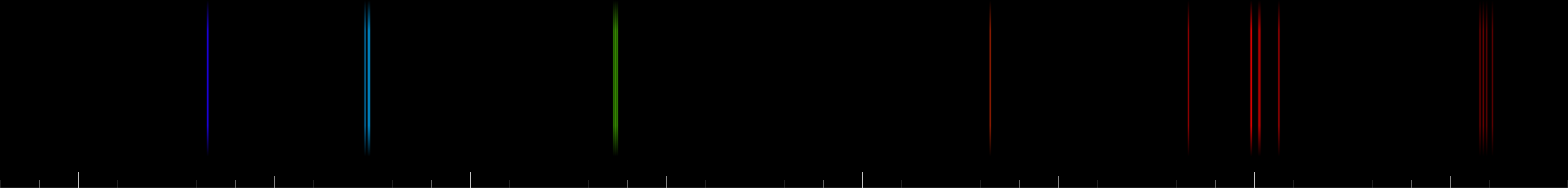
- Spectral lines of selenium

Other properties
- Natural occurrence: primordial
- Crystal structure: grey: hexagonal (hP3)
- Lattice constants: a = 436.46 pm c = 495.77 pm (at 20 °C)
- Thermal expansion: amorphous: 37 µm/(m⋅K) (at 25 °C)
- Thermal conductivity: amorphous: 0.519 W/(m⋅K)
- Magnetic ordering: diamagnetic
- Molar magnetic susceptibility: −25.0×10^{−6} cm^{3}/mol (298 K)
- Young's modulus: 10 GPa
- Shear modulus: 3.7 GPa
- Bulk modulus: 8.3 GPa
- Speed of sound thin rod: 3350 m/s (at 20 °C)
- Poisson ratio: 0.33
- Mohs hardness: 2.0
- Brinell hardness: 736 MPa
- CAS Number: 7782-49-2

History
- Naming: after Selene, Greek goddess of the moon
- Discovery and first isolation: Jöns Jakob Berzelius and Johann Gottlieb Gahn (1817)

Isotopes of selenium
| Main isotopes | | | Decay | |
| Isotope | abundance | half-life (t_{1/2}) | mode | product |
|---|---|---|---|---|
| ^{72}Se | synth | 8.40 d | ε | ^{72}As |
| ^{74}Se | 0.86% | stable | | |
| ^{75}Se | synth | 119.78 d | ε | ^{75}As |
| ^{76}Se | 9.23% | stable | | |
| ^{77}Se | 7.60% | stable | | |
| ^{78}Se | 23.69% | stable | | |
| ^{79}Se | (unstable) | 3.27×10^{5} y | β^{−} | ^{79}Br |
| ^{80}Se | 49.80% | stable | | |
| ^{82}Se | 8.82% | 8.76×10^{19} y | β^{−}β^{−} | ^{82}Kr |

Selenium is a chemical element; it has symbol Se and atomic number 34. It has various physical appearances, including a brick-red powder, a vitreous black solid, and a grey metallic-looking form. It seldom occurs in this elemental state or as pure ore compounds in Earth's crust. Selenium (from σελήνη 'moon') was discovered in 1817 by Jöns Jacob Berzelius, who noted the similarity of the new element to the previously discovered tellurium (named for the Earth).

Selenium is found in metal sulfide ores, where it substitutes for sulfur. Commercially, selenium is produced as a byproduct in the refining of these ores. Minerals that are pure selenide or selenate compounds are rare. The chief commercial uses for selenium today are glassmaking and pigments. Selenium is a semiconductor and is used in photocells. Applications in electronics, once important, have been mostly replaced with silicon semiconductor devices. Selenium is still used in a few types of DC power surge protectors and one type of fluorescent quantum dot.

Although trace amounts of selenium are necessary for cellular function in many animals, including humans, both elemental selenium and (especially) selenium salts are toxic in even small doses, causing selenosis. Symptoms include (in decreasing order of frequency): diarrhea, fatigue, hair loss, joint pain, nail brittleness or discoloration, nausea, headache, tingling, vomiting, and fever.

Selenium is listed as an ingredient in many multivitamins and other dietary supplements, as well as in infant formula, and is a component of the antioxidant enzymes glutathione peroxidase and thioredoxin reductase (which indirectly reduce certain oxidized molecules in animals and some plants) as well as in three deiodinase enzymes. Selenium requirements in plants differ by species, with some plants requiring relatively large amounts and others apparently not requiring any.

== Characteristics ==
=== Physical properties ===
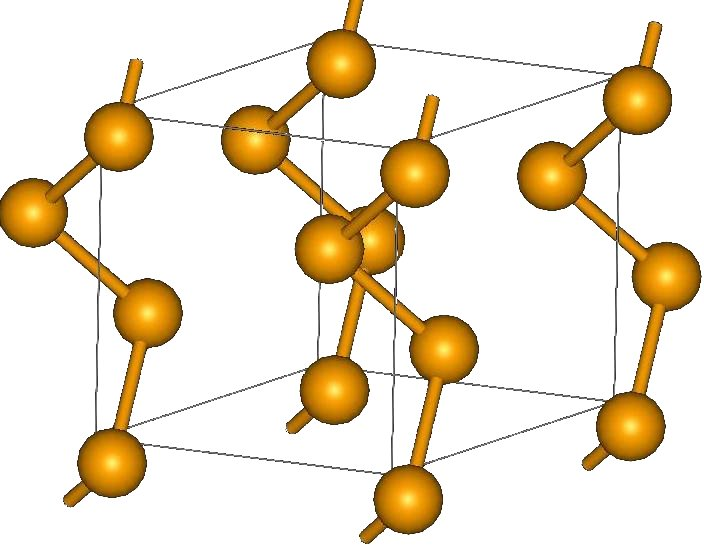
Structure of hexagonal (gray) selenium

Selenium forms several allotropes that interconvert with temperature changes, depending somewhat on the rate of temperature change. When prepared in chemical reactions, selenium is usually an amorphous, brick-red powder. When rapidly melted, it forms the black, vitreous form, usually sold commercially as beads. The structure of black selenium is irregular and complex and consists of polymeric rings with up to 1000 atoms per ring. Black selenium is a brittle, lustrous solid that is slightly soluble in CS_{2}. Upon heating, it softens at 50 °C and converts to gray selenium at 180 °C; the transformation temperature is reduced by presence of halogens and amines.

Structure of cyclo-Se_{8}, "red selenium".

The red α, β, and γ forms are produced from solutions of black selenium by varying the evaporation rate of the solvent (usually CS_{2}). They all have a relatively low, monoclinic crystal symmetry (space group 14) and contain nearly identical puckered cyclooctaselenium (Se_{8}) rings as in sulfur. The eight atoms of a ring are not equivalent (i.e. they are not mapped one onto another by any symmetry operation), and in fact in the γ-monoclinic form, half the rings are in one configuration (and its mirror image) and half in another. The packing is most dense in the α form. In the Se_{8} rings, the Se–Se distance varies depending on where the pair of atoms is in the ring, but the average is 233.5 pm, and the Se–Se–Se angle is on average 105.7°. Other selenium allotropes may contain Se_{6} or Se_{7} rings.

The most stable and dense form of selenium is gray and has a chiral hexagonal crystal lattice (space group 152 or 154 depending on the chirality) consisting of helical polymeric chains, where the Se–Se distance is 237.3 pm and Se–Se–Se angle is 103.1°. The minimum distance between chains is 343.6 pm. Gray selenium is formed by mild heating of other allotropes, by slow cooling of molten selenium, or by condensing selenium vapor just below the melting point. Whereas other selenium forms are insulators, gray selenium is a semiconductor showing appreciable photoconductivity. Unlike the other allotropes, it is insoluble in CSs. It resists oxidation by air and is not attacked by nonoxidizing acids. With strong reducing agents, it forms polyselenides. Selenium does not exhibit the changes in viscosity that sulfur undergoes when gradually heated.

=== Isotopes ===
Selenium has seven naturally occurring isotopes. Five of these, ^{74}Se, ^{76}Se, ^{77}Se, ^{78}Se, ^{80}Se, are stable, with ^{80}Se being the most abundant (49.6% natural abundance). Also naturally occurring is the long-lived primordial radionuclide ^{82}Se, with a half-life of 8.76 × 10^{19} years. The non-primordial radioisotope ^{79}Se also occurs in minute quantities in uranium ores as a product of nuclear fission. Selenium also has numerous unstable synthetic isotopes ranging from ^{64}Se to ^{95}Se; the most stable are ^{75}Se with a half-life of 119.78 days and ^{72}Se with a half-life of 8.4 days. Isotopes lighter than the stable isotopes primarily undergo beta plus decay to isotopes of arsenic, and isotopes heavier than the stable isotopes undergo beta minus decay to isotopes of bromine, with some minor neutron emission branches in the heaviest known isotopes.

Selenium isotopes of greatest stability
| Isotope | Nature | Origin | Half-life |
|---|---|---|---|
| ^{74}Se | Primordial | | Stable |
| ^{76}Se | Primordial | | Stable |
| ^{77}Se | Primordial | Fission product | Stable |
| ^{78}Se | Primordial | Fission product | Stable |
| ^{79}Se | Trace | Fission product | 327000 yr |
| ^{80}Se | Primordial | Fission product | Stable |
| ^{82}Se | Primordial | Fission product* | 8.76×10^{19} yr (Note: For all practical purposes, ^{82}Se is stable.) |

== Chemical compounds ==
Selenium compounds commonly exist in the oxidation states −2, +2, +4, and +6. It is a nonmetal (more rarely considered a metalloid) with properties that are intermediate between the elements above and below in the periodic table, sulfur and tellurium, and also has similarities to arsenic.

=== Chalcogen compounds ===
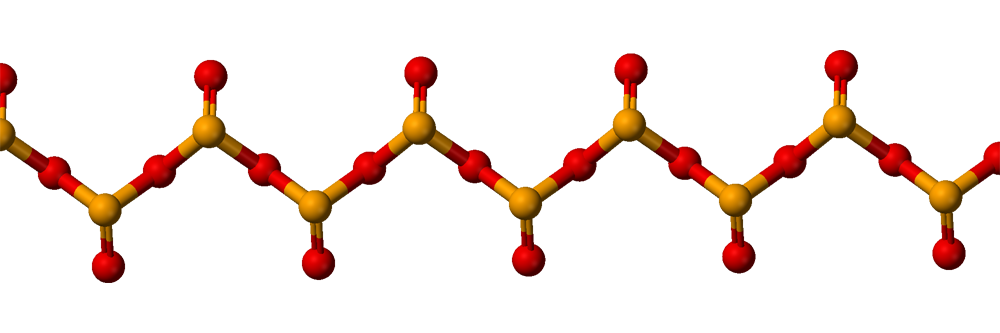
Structure of the polymer SeO_{2}: The (pyramidal) selenium atoms are yellow.

Selenium forms two oxides: selenium dioxide (SeO_{2}) and selenium trioxide (SeO_{3}). Selenium dioxide is formed by combustion of elemental selenium:

Se + O_{2} → SeO_{2}

It is a polymeric solid that forms monomeric SeO_{2} molecules in the gas phase. It dissolves in water to form selenous acid, H_{2}SeO_{3}. Selenous acid can also be made directly by oxidizing elemental selenium with nitric acid:

3 Se + 4 HNO_{3} + H_{2}O → 3 H_{2}SeO_{3} + 4 NO

Unlike sulfur, which forms a stable trioxide, selenium trioxide is thermodynamically unstable and decomposes to the dioxide above 185 °C:

2 SeO_{3} → 2 SeO_{2} + O_{2} (ΔH = −54 kJ/mol)

Selenium trioxide is produced in the laboratory by the reaction of anhydrous potassium selenate (K_{2}SeO_{4}) and sulfur trioxide (SO_{3}).

Salts of selenous acid are called selenites. These include silver selenite (Ag_{2}SeO_{3}) and sodium selenite (Na_{2}SeO_{3}).

Hydrogen sulfide reacts with aqueous selenous acid to produce selenium disulfide:

H_{2}SeO_{3} + 2 H_{2}S → SeS_{2} + 3 H_{2}O

Selenium disulfide consists of 8-membered rings. It has an approximate composition of SeS_{2}, with individual rings varying in composition, such as Se_{4}S_{4} and Se_{2}S_{6}. Selenium disulfide has been used in shampoo as an anti-dandruff agent, an inhibitor in polymer chemistry, a glass dye, and a reducing agent in fireworks.

Selenium trioxide may be synthesized by dehydrating selenic acid, H_{2}SeO_{4}, which is itself produced by the oxidation of selenium dioxide with hydrogen peroxide:

SeO_{2} + H_{2}O_{2} → H_{2}SeO_{4}

=== Halogen compounds ===
Selenium reacts with fluorine to form selenium hexafluoride:

Se_{8} + 24 F_{2} → 8 SeF_{6}

In comparison with its sulfur counterpart (sulfur hexafluoride), selenium hexafluoride (SeF_{6}) is more reactive and is a toxic pulmonary irritant. Selenium tetrafluoride is a laboratory-scale fluorinating agent.

The only stable chlorides are selenium tetrachloride (SeCl_{4}) and selenium monochloride (Se_{2}Cl_{2}), which might be better known as selenium(I) chloride and is structurally analogous to disulfur dichloride. Metastable solutions of selenium dichloride can be prepared from sulfuryl chloride and selenium (reaction of the elements generates the tetrachloride instead), and constitute an important reagent in the preparation of selenium compounds (e.g. Se_{7}). The corresponding bromides are all known, and recapitulate the same stability and structure as the chlorides.

The iodides of selenium are not well known, and for a long time were believed not to exist. There is limited spectroscopic evidence that the lower iodides may form in bi-elemental solutions with nonpolar solvents, such as carbon disulfide and carbon tetrachloride; but even these appear to decompose under illumination.

Some selenium oxyhalides—seleninyl fluoride (SeOF_{2}) and selenium oxychloride (SeOCl_{2})—have been used as specialty solvents.

=== Metal selenides ===
Structures of two polyselenide anions

Analogous to the behavior of other chalcogens, selenium forms hydrogen selenide, H_{2}Se. It is a strongly odiferous, toxic, and colorless gas. It is more acidic than H_{2}S. In solution it ionizes to HSe^{−}. The selenide dianion Se^{2−} forms a variety of compounds, including the minerals from which selenium is obtained commercially. Illustrative selenides include mercury selenide (HgSe), lead selenide (PbSe), zinc selenide (ZnSe), and copper indium gallium diselenide (Cu(Ga,In)Se_{2}). These materials are semiconductors. With highly electropositive metals, such as aluminium, these selenides are prone to hydrolysis, which may be described by this idealized equation:

Al_{2}Se_{3} + 6 H_{2}O → 2 Al(OH)_{3} + 3 H_{2}Se

Alkali metal selenides react with selenium to form polyselenides, Se_{n}^{2−}, which exist as chains and rings.

=== Other compounds ===
Tetraselenium tetranitride, Se_{4}N_{4}, is an explosive orange compound analogous to tetrasulfur tetranitride (S_{4}N_{4}). It can be synthesized by the reaction of selenium tetrachloride (SeCl_{4}) with ([(CH_{3})_{3}Si]_{2}N)_{2}Se.

Selenium reacts with cyanides to yield selenocyanates:

8 KCN + Se_{8} → 8 KSeCN

=== Organoselenium compounds ===
Selenium, especially in the II oxidation state, forms a variety of organic derivatives. They are structurally analogous to the corresponding organosulfur compounds. Especially common are selenides (R_{2}Se, analogues of thioethers), diselenides (R_{2}Se_{2}, analogues of disulfides), and selenols (RSeH, analogues of thiols). Representatives of selenides, diselenides, and selenols include respectively selenomethionine, diphenyldiselenide, and benzeneselenol. The sulfoxide in sulfur chemistry is represented in selenium chemistry by the selenoxides (formula RSe(O)R), which are intermediates in organic synthesis, as illustrated by the selenoxide elimination reaction. Consistent with trends indicated by the double bond rule, selenoketones, R(C=Se)R, and selenaldehydes, R(C=Se)H, are rarely observed.

== History ==
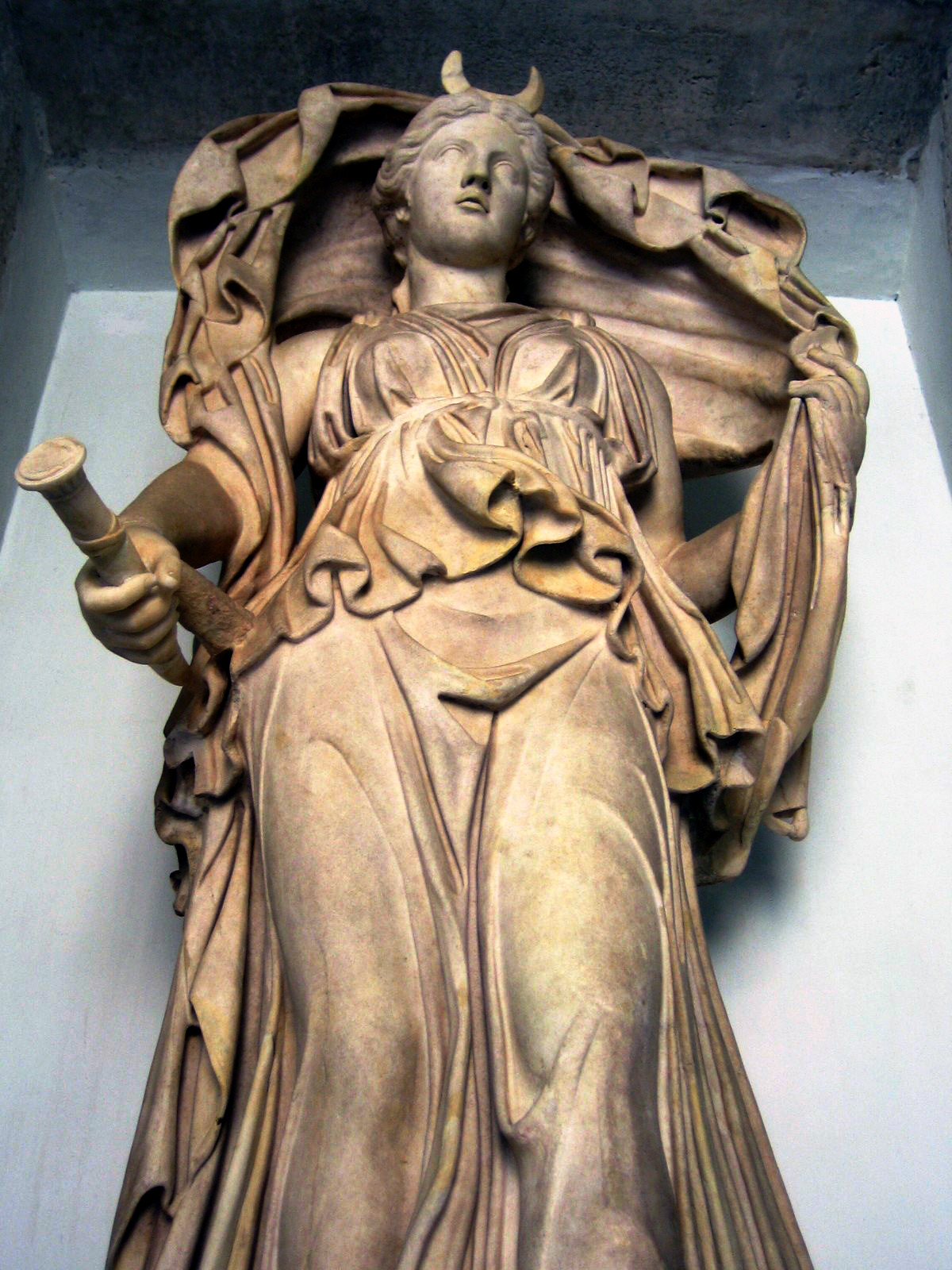
Selenium is named after Selene, the Greek Goddess of the Moon

Selenium (from Greek σελήνη, selene, meaning 'Moon') was discovered in 1817 by Jöns Jacob Berzelius and Johan Gottlieb Gahn. Both chemists owned a chemistry plant near Gripsholm, Sweden, producing sulfuric acid by the lead chamber process. Pyrite samples from the Falun Mine produced a red solid precipitate in the lead chambers, which was presumed to be an arsenic compound, so the use of pyrite to make acid was discontinued. Berzelius and Gahn, who wanted to use the pyrite, observed that the red precipitate gave off an odor like horseradish when burned. This smell was not typical of arsenic, but a similar odor was known from tellurium compounds. Hence, Berzelius's first letter to Alexander Marcet stated that this was a tellurium compound. However, the lack of tellurium compounds in the Falun Mine minerals eventually led Berzelius to reanalyze the red precipitate, and in 1818 he wrote a second letter to Marcet describing a newly found element similar to sulfur and tellurium. Because of its similarity to tellurium, named for the Earth, Berzelius named the new element after the Moon.

In 1873, Willoughby Smith found that the electrical conductivity of grey selenium was affected by light. This led to its use as a cell for sensing light. The first commercial products using selenium were developed by Werner Siemens in the mid-1870s. The selenium cell was used in the photophone developed by Alexander Graham Bell in 1879. Selenium transmits an electric current proportional to the amount of light falling on its surface. This phenomenon was used in the design of light meters and similar devices. Selenium's semiconductor properties found numerous other applications in electronics. The development of selenium rectifiers began during the early 1930s, and these replaced copper oxide rectifiers because they were more efficient. These lasted in commercial applications until the 1970s, following which they were replaced with less expensive and even more efficient silicon rectifiers.

Selenium came to medical notice later because of its toxicity to industrial workers. Selenium was also recognized as an important veterinary toxin, which is seen in animals that have eaten high-selenium plants. In 1954, the first hints of specific biological functions of selenium were discovered in microorganisms by biochemist, Jane Pinsent. It was discovered to be essential for mammalian life in 1957. In the 1970s, it was shown to be present in two independent sets of enzymes. This was followed by the discovery of selenocysteine in proteins. During the 1980s, selenocysteine was shown to be encoded by the codon UGA. The recoding mechanism was worked out first in bacteria and then in mammals (see SECIS element).

== Occurrence ==
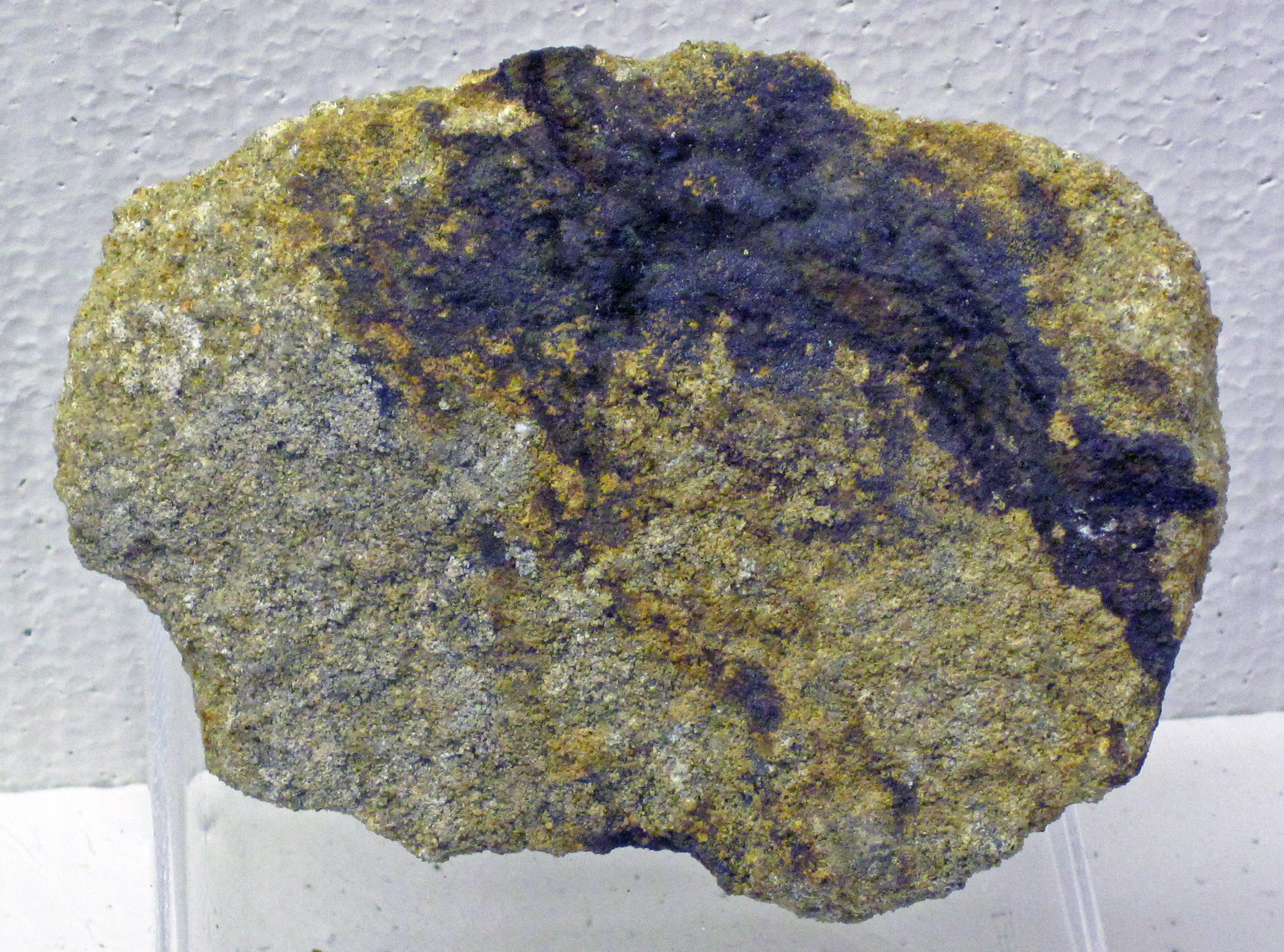
Native selenium in sandstone, from a uranium mine near Grants, New Mexico

Native (i.e., elemental) selenium is a rare mineral, which does not usually form good crystals, but, when it does, they are steep rhombohedra or tiny acicular (hair-like) crystals. Isolation of selenium is often complicated by the presence of other compounds and elements.

Selenium occurs naturally in several inorganic forms, including selenide, selenate, and selenite, but these minerals are rare. The common mineral selenite is not a selenium mineral, and contains no selenite ion, but is rather a type of gypsum (calcium sulfate dihydrate) named like selenium for the moon well before the discovery of selenium. Selenium is most commonly found as an impurity, replacing a small fraction of the sulfur in sulfide ores of many metals, particularly copper sulfide.

In living systems, selenium is found in the amino acids selenomethionine, selenocysteine, and methylselenocysteine. In these compounds, selenium plays a role analogous to that of sulfur. Another naturally occurring organoselenium compound is dimethyl selenide.

Certain soils are selenium-rich, and selenium can be bioconcentrated by some plants. In soils, selenium most often occurs in soluble forms such as selenate (analogous to sulfate), which are leached into rivers very easily by runoff. Ocean water contains significant amounts of selenium.

Typical background concentrations of selenium do not exceed 1 ng/m^{3} in the atmosphere; 1 mg/kg in soil and vegetation and 0.5 μg/L in freshwater and seawater, 0.05 – 0.09 mg/kg average crustal abundance.

Anthropogenic sources of selenium include coal burning and the mining and smelting of sulfide ores.

== Production ==
Refined selenium production

Selenium is most commonly produced from selenide in many sulfide ores, such as those of copper, nickel, or lead. Electrolytic metal refining is particularly productive of selenium as a byproduct, obtained from the anode mud of copper refineries. Dissolved selenite anions present in the electrolysis solution are also known to interfere with the electrorefining process of copper.

Another source was the mud from the lead chambers of sulfuric acid plants, a process that is no longer used. Selenium can be refined from these muds by a number of methods. However, most elemental selenium comes as a byproduct of refining copper or producing sulfuric acid. Since its invention, solvent extraction and electrowinning (SX/EW) production of copper produces an increasing share of the worldwide copper supply. This changes the availability of selenium because only a comparably small part of the selenium in the ore is leached with the copper.

Industrial production of selenium usually involves the extraction of selenium dioxide from residues obtained during the purification of copper. Common production from the residue then begins by oxidation with sodium carbonate to produce selenium dioxide, which is mixed with water and acidified to form selenous acid (oxidation step). Selenous acid is bubbled with sulfur dioxide (reduction step) to give elemental selenium.

About 2,000 tonnes of selenium were produced in 2011 worldwide, mostly in Germany (650 t), Japan (630 t), Belgium (200 t), and Russia (140 t), and the total reserves were estimated at 93,000 tonnes. These data exclude two major producers: the United States and China. A previous sharp increase was observed in 2004 from $4–$5 to $27/lb. The price was relatively stable during 2004–2010 at about US$30 per pound (in 100 pound lots) but increased to $65/lb in 2011. The consumption in 2010 was divided as follows: metallurgy – 30%, glass manufacturing – 30%, agriculture – 10%, chemicals and pigments – 10%, and electronics – 10%. China is the dominant consumer of selenium at 1,500–2,000 tonnes/year.

== Applications ==
=== Manganese electrolysis ===
During the electrowinning of manganese, the addition of selenium dioxide decreases the power necessary to operate the electrolysis cells. China is the largest consumer of selenium dioxide for this purpose. For every tonne of manganese, an average 2 kg selenium oxide is used.

=== Glass production ===
The largest commercial use of selenium, accounting for about 50% of consumption, is for the production of glass. Selenium compounds confer a red color to glass. This color cancels out the green or yellow tints that arise from iron impurities typical for most glass. For this purpose, various selenite and selenate salts are added. For other applications, a red color may be desired, produced by mixtures of CdSe and CdS.

=== Alloys ===
Selenium is used with bismuth in brasses to replace more toxic lead. The regulation of lead in drinking water applications such as in the US with the Safe Drinking Water Act of 1974, made a reduction of lead in brass necessary. The new brass is marketed under the name EnviroBrass. Like lead and sulfur, selenium improves the machinability of steel at concentrations around 0.15%. Selenium produces the same machinability improvement in copper alloys.

=== Solar cells ===
Selenium was used as the photoabsorbing layer in the first solid-state solar cell, which was demonstrated by the English physicist William Grylls Adams and his student Richard Evans Day in 1876. Only a few years later, Charles Fritts fabricated the first thin-film solar cell, also using selenium as the photoabsorber.

As silicon solar cells emerged in the 1950s, research on selenium thin-film solar cells declined. The record efficiency of 5.0% demonstrated by Tokio Nakada and Akio Kunioka in 1985 remained unchanged for more than 30 years.

In 2017, researchers from IBM achieved a new record efficiency of 6.5% by redesigning the device structure. Following this achievement, selenium has gained renewed interest as a wide bandgap photoabsorber with the potential of being integrated in tandem with lower bandgap photoabsorbers. In 2024, the first selenium-based tandem solar cell was demonstrated, showcasing a selenium top cell monolithically integrated with a silicon bottom cell.

A significant deficit in the open-circuit voltage is currently the limiting factor to further improve the efficiency, necessitating defect-engineering strategies for selenium thin-films to enhance the carrier lifetime. Recent theoretical studies using first-principles defect calculations have shown that selenium exhibits intrinsic point defect tolerance, suggesting that interfaces and extended defects are the primary factors limiting device performance. As of now, the only defect-engineering strategy that has been investigated for selenium thin-film solar cells involves crystallizing selenium using a laser.

=== Photoconductors ===
Amorphous selenium (α-Se) thin films have found application as photoconductors in flat-panel X-ray detectors. These detectors use amorphous selenium to capture and convert incident X-ray photons directly into electric charge. Selenium has been chosen for this application among other semiconductors owing to a combination of its favorable technological and physical properties:

1. Amorphous selenium has a low melting point, high vapor pressure, and uniform structure. These three properties allow quick and easy deposition of large-area uniform films with a thickness up to 1 mm at a rate of 1–5 μm/min. Their uniformity and lack of grain boundaries, which are intrinsic to polycrystalline materials, improve the X-ray image quality. Meanwhile the large area is essential for scanning the human body or luggage items.
2. Selenium is less toxic than many compound semiconductors that contain arsenic or heavy metals such as mercury or lead.
3. The mobility in applied electric field is sufficiently high both for electrons and holes, so that in a typical 0.2 mm thick device, c. 98% of electrons and holes produced by X-rays are collected at the electrodes without being trapped by various defects. Consequently, device sensitivity is high, and its behavior is easy to describe by simple transport equations.

=== Rectifiers ===
Selenium rectifiers were first used in 1933. They have mostly been replaced by silicon-based devices. One notable exception is in power DC surge protection, where the superior energy capabilities of selenium suppressors make them more desirable than metal-oxide varistors.

=== Other uses ===
The demand for selenium by the electronics industry is declining. Its photovoltaic and photoconductive properties are still useful in photocopying, photocells, light meters and solar cells. Its use as a photoconductor in plain-paper copiers once was a leading application, but in the 1980s, the photoconductor application declined (although it was still a large end-use) as more and more copiers switched to organic photoconductors.

Zinc selenide was the first material for blue LEDs, but gallium nitride dominates that market. Cadmium selenide can be used to make quantum dots. Sheets of amorphous selenium convert X-ray images to patterns of charge in xeroradiography and in solid-state, flat-panel X-ray cameras. Ionized selenium (Se+24, where 24 of the outer D, S and P orbitals are stripped away due to high input energies) is one of the active mediums used in X-ray lasers. ^{75}Se is used as a gamma source in industrial radiography.

Selenium catalyzes some chemical reactions, but it is not widely used because of issues with toxicity. In X-ray crystallography, incorporation of one or more selenium atoms in place of sulfur helps with multiple-wavelength anomalous dispersion and single wavelength anomalous dispersion phasing.

Selenium is used in the toning of photographic prints, and it is sold as a toner by numerous photographic manufacturers. Selenium intensifies and extends the tonal range of black-and-white photographic images and improves the permanence of prints. Small amounts of organoselenium compounds have been used to modify the catalysts used for the vulcanization for the production of rubber. Selenium is used in some anti-dandruff shampoos in the form of selenium disulfide such as Selsun and Vichy Dereos brands.

== Pollution ==
Selenium pollution might impact some aquatic systems and may be caused by anthropogenic factors such as farming runoff and industrial processes. People who eat more fish are generally healthier than those who eat less, which suggests no major human health concern from selenium pollution, although selenium has a potential effect on humans.

Selenium poisoning of water systems may result whenever new agricultural run-off courses through dry lands. This process leaches natural soluble selenium compounds (such as selenates) into the water, which may then be concentrated in wetlands as the water evaporates. Selenium pollution of waterways also occurs when selenium is leached from coal flue ash, mining and metal smelting, crude oil processing, and landfill. High selenium levels in waterways were found to cause congenital disorders in oviparous species, including wetland birds and fish. Elevated dietary methylmercury levels can amplify the harm of selenium toxicity in oviparous species.

Selenium is bioaccumulated in aquatic habitats, which results in higher concentrations in organisms than the surrounding water. Organoselenium compounds can be concentrated over 200,000 times by zooplankton when water concentrations are in the 0.5 to 0.8 μg Se/L range. Inorganic selenium bioaccumulates more readily in phytoplankton than zooplankton. Phytoplankton can concentrate inorganic selenium by a factor of 3000. Further concentration through bioaccumulation occurs along the food chain, as predators consume selenium-rich prey. It is recommended that a water concentration of 2 μg Se/L be considered highly hazardous to sensitive fish and aquatic birds. Selenium poisoning can be passed from parents to offspring through the egg, and selenium poisoning may persist for many generations. Reproduction of mallard ducks is impaired at dietary concentrations of 7 μg Se/L. Many benthic invertebrates can tolerate selenium concentrations up to 300 μg/L of selenium in their diet.

Bioaccumulation of selenium in aquatic environments causes fish kills depending on the species in the affected area. There are, however, a few species that have been seen to survive these events and tolerate the increased selenium. It has also been suggested that the season could have an impact on the harmful effects of selenium on fish. Substantial physiological changes may occur in fish with high tissue concentrations of selenium. Fish affected by selenium may experience swelling of the gill lamellae, which impedes oxygen diffusion across the gills and blood flow within the gills. Respiratory capacity is further reduced due to selenium binding to hemoglobin. Other problems include degeneration of liver tissue, swelling around the heart, damaged egg follicles in ovaries, cataracts, and accumulation of fluid in the body cavity and head. Selenium often causes a malformed fish fetus which may have problems feeding or respiring; distortion of the fins or spine is also common. Adult fish may appear healthy despite their inability to produce viable offspring.

=== Examples ===
In Belews Lake North Carolina, 19 species of fish were eliminated from the lake due to 150–200 μg Se/L wastewater discharged from 1974 to 1986 from a Duke Energy coal-fired power plant. At the Kesterson National Wildlife Refuge in California, thousands of fish and waterbirds were poisoned by selenium in agricultural irrigation drainage.

== Biological role ==
Elemental selenium
Hazards
- GHS labelling
| Pictograms | (GHS06: Toxic) (GHS08: Health hazard) |
| Signal word | Danger |
| Hazard statements | H301+H331, H361, H372, H413 |
| Precautionary statements | P203, P260, P264, P270, P273, P280, P301+P316, P304+P340, P308+P316, P319, P321, P330, P403+P233, P405 |
| NFPA 704 (fire diamond) | 2 0 0 |

Although it is toxic in large doses, selenium is an essential micronutrient for animals. In plants, it occurs as a bystander mineral, sometimes in toxic proportions in forage (some plants may accumulate selenium as a defense against being eaten by animals, but other plants, such as locoweed, require selenium, and their growth indicates the presence of selenium in soil). The selenium content in the human body is believed to be in the range of 13–20 mg.

Selenium is a component of the unusual amino acids selenocysteine and selenomethionine. In humans, selenium is a trace element nutrient that functions as cofactor for reduction of antioxidant enzymes, such as glutathione peroxidases and certain forms of thioredoxin reductase found in animals and some plants (this enzyme occurs in all living organisms, but not all forms of it in plants require selenium).

The glutathione peroxidase family of enzymes (GSH-Px) catalyze reactions that remove reactive oxygen species such as hydrogen peroxide and organic hydroperoxides.

The thyroid gland and every cell that uses thyroid hormone also use selenium, which is a cofactor for three of the four known types of thyroid hormone deiodinases, which activate and then deactivate various thyroid hormones and their metabolites; the iodothyronine deiodinases are the subfamily of deiodinase enzymes that use selenium as the otherwise rare amino acid selenocysteine.

Increased dietary selenium reduces the effects of mercury toxicity, although it is effective only at low to modest doses of mercury. Evidence suggests that the molecular mechanisms of mercury toxicity include the irreversible inhibition of selenoenzymes that are required to prevent and reverse oxidative damage in brain and endocrine tissues. The selenium-containing compound selenoneine is present in the blood of bluefin tuna. Certain plants are considered indicators of high selenium content of the soil because they require high levels of selenium to thrive. The main selenium indicator plants are Astragalus species (including some locoweeds), prince's plume (Stanleya sp.), woody asters (Xylorhiza sp.), and false goldenweed (Oonopsis sp.).

=== Nutritional sources of selenium ===
Dietary selenium comes from meat (including some fish and seafood), some nuts, cereals, mushrooms, and eggs. Brazil nuts are the richest dietary source (although this is soil-dependent since the Brazil nut does not require high levels of the element for its own needs), and the content is high enough that an excessive daily consumption of Brazil nuts may lead to a toxic level even though one a day may be nutritious and, quite helpful in certain health circumstances. In descending order of concentration, high levels of selenium in meat are found in kidney, tuna, crab, and lobster.

The US Recommended Dietary Allowance (RDA) of selenium for teenagers and adults is 55 μg/day. Selenium as a dietary supplement is available in many forms, including multi-vitamins/mineral supplements, which typically contain 55 or 70 μg/serving. Selenium-specific supplements typically contain either 100 or 200 μg/serving. In June 2015, the US Food and Drug Administration (FDA) published its final rule establishing a requirement for minimum and maximum levels of selenium in infant formula.

=== Toxicity ===
Although selenium is an essential trace element, it is toxic if taken in excess. Exceeding the Tolerable Upper Intake Level of 400 micrograms per day can lead to selenosis. This 400 microgram (μg) Tolerable Upper Intake Level is based primarily on a 1986 study of five Chinese patients who exhibited overt signs of selenosis and a follow-up study on the same five people in 1992. The 1992 study actually found the maximum safe dietary Se intake to be approximately 800 micrograms per day (15 micrograms per kilogram body weight), but suggested 400 micrograms per day to not only avoid toxicity, but also to avoid creating an imbalance of nutrients in the diet and to account for data from other countries. In China, people who ingested corn grown in extremely selenium-rich stony coal (carbonaceous shale) have suffered from selenium toxicity. This coal was shown to have selenium content as high as 9.1%, the highest concentration in coal ever recorded in literature.

Symptoms of selenosis include a garlic odor on the breath, gastrointestinal disorders, hair loss, sloughing of nails, fatigue, irritability, and neurological damage. Extreme cases of selenosis can result in cirrhosis of the liver, pulmonary edema, and death. Elemental selenium and most metallic selenides have relatively low toxicities because of their low bioavailability. By contrast, selenates and selenites are very toxic, having an oxidant mode of action similar to that of arsenic trioxide. The chronic toxic dose of selenite for humans is about 2400 to 3000 micrograms of selenium per day for a long time. Hydrogen selenide is an extremely toxic, corrosive gas. Selenium also occurs in organic compounds, such as dimethyl selenide, selenomethionine, selenocysteine and methylselenocysteine, all of which have high bioavailability and are toxic in large doses.

The Occupational Safety and Health Administration (OSHA) has set the legal limit (permissible exposure limit) for selenium in the workplace at 0.2 mg/m^{3} over an 8-hour workday. The National Institute for Occupational Safety and Health (NIOSH) has set a Recommended exposure limit (REL) of 0.2 mg/m^{3} over an 8-hour workday. At levels of 1 mg/m^{3}, selenium is immediately dangerous to life and health.

==== Detection in biological fluids ====
Selenium may be measured in blood, plasma, serum or urine to monitor excessive environmental or occupational exposure, confirm a diagnosis of poisoning in hospitalized victims or to assist in a forensic investigation in a case of fatal overdosage. Some analytical techniques are capable of distinguishing organic from inorganic forms of the element. Both organic and inorganic forms of selenium are largely converted to monosaccharide conjugates (selenosugars) in the body prior to being eliminated in the urine. Cancer patients receiving daily oral doses of selenothionine may achieve very high plasma and urine selenium concentrations.

=== Deficiency ===
Selenium is essential for human reproduction and growth. Moderate selenium deficiency is linked to muscle weakness and muscle diseases. Mental health effects include low mood, confusion, and anxiety.

Selenium interacts with other nutrients, such as iodide and vitamin E. The interaction is observed in the etiology of many deficiency diseases in animals, and pure selenium deficiency is rare. The effect of selenium deficiency on health remains uncertain, particularly in relation to Kashin-Beck disease.

In the regions (e.g., regions within North America) where low selenium soil levels lead to low concentrations in the plants, some animal species may be deficient unless selenium is supplemented with diet or injection. Ruminants are particularly susceptible. In general, absorption of dietary selenium is lower in ruminants than in other animals and is lower in forages than in grain. Ruminants grazing certain forages, e.g., some white clover varieties containing cyanogenic glycosides, may have higher selenium requirements, presumably because cyanide is released from the aglycone by glucosidase activity in the rumen and glutathione peroxidases are deactivated by the cyanide acting on the glutathione moiety. Neonate ruminants at risk of white muscle disease may be administered both selenium and vitamin E by injection; some of the WMD myopathies respond only to selenium, some only to vitamin E, and some to either.

=== General health effects ===
The effects of selenium intake on cancer have been studied in several clinical trials and epidemiologic studies in humans. Selenium may have a chemo-preventive role in cancer risk as an anti-oxidant, and it might trigger the immune response. At low levels, it is used in the body to create anti-oxidant selenoproteins, at higher doses than normal it causes cell death.

Selenium (in close interrelation with iodine) plays a role in thyroid health. Selenium is a cofactor for the three thyroid hormone deiodinases, helping activate and then deactivate various thyroid hormones and their metabolites. Isolated selenium deficiency is now being investigated for its role in the induction of autoimmune reactions in the thyroid gland in Hashimoto's disease. In a case of combined iodine and selenium deficiency was shown to play a thyroid-protecting role.

== See also ==
- Abundance of elements in Earth's crust
- ACES (nutritional supplement)
- Selenium yeast
