= Selenocystine =

Identifiers
CAS Number	L: 29621-88-3; DL: 2897-21-4; D: 26932-45-6
3D model (JSmol)	L: Interactive image; DL: Interactive image; D: Interactive image
Beilstein Reference	1969559
ChEBI	DL: CHEBI:28553
ChemSpider	L: 179613; DL: 14376
ECHA InfoCard	100.130.419
EC Number	L: 608-382-6; DL: 636-685-3
KEGG	L: C05704
PubChem CID	L: 207306; DL: 15104; D: 33648
UNII	L: 261B157KR8; DL: 493154PTZ7; D: 36B4M60N9C
CompTox Dashboard (EPA)	L: DTXSID001044310
- InChI: InChI=1S/C6H12N2O4Se2/c7-3(5(9)10)1-13-14-2-4(8)6(11)12/h3-4H,1-2,7-8H2,(H,9,10)(H,11,12)/t3-,4-/m0/s1 Key: JULROCUWKLNBSN-IMJSIDKUSA-N; DL: InChI=1S/C6H12N2O4Se2/c7-3(5(9)10)1-13-14-2-4(8)6(11)12/h3-4H,1-2,7-8H2,(H,9,10)(H,11,12) Key: JULROCUWKLNBSN-UHFFFAOYSA-N; D: InChI=1S/C6H12N2O4Se2/c7-3(5(9)10)1-13-14-2-4(8)6(11)12/h3-4H,1-2,7-8H2,(H,9,10)(H,11,12)/t3-,4-/m1/s1 Key: JULROCUWKLNBSN-QWWZWVQMSA-N
- SMILES: L: C([C@@H](C(=O)O)N)[Se][Se]C[C@@H](C(=O)O)N; DL: C(C(C(=O)O)N)[Se][Se]CC(C(=O)O)N; D: C([C@H](C(=O)O)N)[Se][Se]C[C@H](C(=O)O)N

Properties
Chemical formula	C_{6}H_{12}N_{2}O_{4}Se_{2}
Molar mass	334.114 g·mol^{−1}
Appearance	white solid
Melting point	222 °C (432 °F; 495 K)

Hazards
- GHS labelling
Pictograms	(GHS06: Toxic) (GHS08: Health hazard) (GHS09: Environmental hazard)
Signal word	Danger
Hazard statements	H301, H331, H373, H410
Precautionary statements	P260, P264, P270, P271, P273, P301+P316, P304+P340, P316, P319, P321, P330, P391, P403+P233, P405, P501
- Except where otherwise noted, data are given for materials in their standard state (at 25 °C [77 °F], 100 kPa). Infobox references

Selenocystine is the amino acid with the formula (HO_{2}CCH(NH_{2})CH_{2}Se)_{2}. It is the oxidized derivative of the canonical amino acid selenocysteine (HO_{2}CCH(NH_{2})CH_{2}SeH). The compound can also be prepared synthetically from serine. Because selenocysteine is not easily isolated or handled, it is often generated by reduction of selenocystine in situ. The selenium–selenium bond length is 2.321 Å, which is 14% longer than the disulfide bond in cystine at 2.040 Å.
