= Kashin–Beck disease =

- Specialty: Rheumatology

Kashin–Beck disease (KBD) is a chronic, endemic type of osteochondropathy (disease of the bone) that is mainly distributed from northeastern to southwestern China, including 15 provinces. As of 2011, Tibet has the highest incidence rate of KBD in China. Southeast Siberia and North Korea are other affected areas. KBD usually involves children ages 5–15. To date, more than a million individuals have had KBD. The symptoms of KBD include joint pain, morning stiffness in the joints, disturbances of flexion and extension in the elbows, enlarged inter-phalangeal joints, and limited motion in many joints of the body. Death of cartilage cells in the growth plate and articular surface is the basic pathologic feature; this can result in growth retardation and secondary osteoarthrosis. Histological diagnosis of KBD is particularly difficult; clinical and radiological examinations have proved to be the best means for identifying KBD. Little is known about the early stages of KBD before the visible appearance of the disease becomes evident in the destruction of the joints.

This disease has been recognized for over 150 years but its cause has not yet been completely defined. Currently, the accepted potential causes of KBD include mycotoxins present in grain, trace mineral deficiency in nutrition, and high levels of fulvic acid in drinking water. Selenium and iodine have been considered the major deficiencies associated with KBD. Mycotoxins produced by fungi can contaminate grain, which may cause KBD because mycotoxins cause the production of free radicals. T-2 is the mycotoxin implicated with KBD, produced by members of several fungal genera. T-2 toxin can cause lesions in hematopoietic, lymphoid, gastrointestinal, and cartilage tissues, especially in physeal cartilage. Fulvic acid present in drinking water damages cartilage cells. Selenium supplementation in selenium deficient areas has been shown to prevent this disease. However, selenium supplementation in some areas showed no significant effect, meaning that deficiency of selenium may not be the dominant cause in KBD. Recently a significant association between SNP rs6910140 of COL9A1 and Kashin–Beck disease was discovered genetically, suggesting a role of COL9A1 in the development of Kashin–Beck disease.

== Cause ==
The cause of KBD remains controversial. Studies of the pathogenesis and risk factors of KBD have proposed selenium deficiency, inorganic (e.g. manganese, phosphate) and organic matter (humic and fulvic acids) in drinking water, and fungi on self-produced storage grain (Alternaria sp., Fusarium sp.) producing trichotecene (T2) mycotoxins.

Most authors accept that the cause of KBD is multifactorial, selenium deficiency being the underlying factor that predisposes the target cells (chondrocytes) to oxidative stress from free-radical carriers, such as mycotoxins in storage grain and fulvic acid in drinking water.

In Tibet, epidemiological studies carried out in 1995–1996 attempted to correlate cases of KBD and with fungal contamination of barley grains by Alternaria sp., Trichotecium sp., Cladosporium sp. and Drechslera sp.

A severe selenium deficiency was documented as well, but selenium status was not associated with the disease, suggesting that selenium deficiency alone could not explain the occurrence of KBD in the villages under study.

An association with the gene Peroxisome Proliferator-Activated Receptor Gamma Coactivator 1 Beta (PPARGC1B) has been reported. This gene is a transcription factor and mutations in this gene would be expected to affect several other genes.

== Prevention ==
Prevention of Kashin–Beck disease has a long history. Intervention strategies were mostly based on one of the three major theories of its cause.

Selenium supplementation, with or without additional antioxidant therapy (vitamin E and vitamin C) has been reported to be successful, but in other studies no significant decrease could be shown compared to a control group. Major drawbacks of selenium supplementation are logistic difficulties (including daily or weekly intake and drug supply), potential toxicity (in case of less well-controlled supplementation strategies), associated iodine deficiency (that should be corrected before selenium supplementation to prevent further deterioration of thyroid status) and low compliance. The latter was certainly the case in Tibet, where selenium supplementation has been implemented from 1987 to 1994 in areas of high endemicity.

With the mycotoxin theory in mind, backing of grains before storage was proposed in Guangxi province, but results are not reported in international literature. Changing from grain source has been reported to be effective in Heilongjiang Province and North Korea.

With respect to the role of drinking water, changing of water sources to deep well water has been reported to decrease the X-ray metaphyseal detection rate in different settings.

In general, the effect of preventive measures however remains controversial, due to methodological problems (no randomised controlled trials), lack of documentation, or, as discussed above, inconsistency of results.

== Treatment ==
Treatment of KBD is palliative. Surgical corrections have been made with success by Chinese and Russian orthopedists. By the end of 1992, Médecins Sans Frontières—Belgium started a physical therapy programme aiming at alleviating the symptoms of KBD patients with advanced joint impairment and pain (mainly adults), in Nyemo county, Lhasa prefecture. Physical therapy had significant effects on joint mobility and joint pain in KBD patients. Later on (1994–1996), the programme has been extended to several other counties and prefectures in Tibet.

== Epidemiology ==
Kashin–Beck disease occurrence is limited to 13 provinces and two autonomous regions of China. It has also been reported in Siberia and North Korea, but incidence in these regions is reported to have decreased with socio-economic development. In China, KBD is estimated to affect some 2 million to 3 million people across China, and 30 million are living in endemic areas. Life expectancy in KBD regions has been reported to be significantly decreased in relation to selenium deficiency and Keshan disease (endemic juvenile dilative cardiomyopathia).

The prevalence of KBD in Tibet varies strongly from valley to valley, and village to village.

Prevalence of clinical symptoms suggestive of KBD reaches 100% in 5- to 15-year-old children in at least one village. Prevalence rates of over 50% are not uncommon. A clinical prevalence survey carried out in Lhasa prefecture yielded a figure of 11.4% for a study population of approximately 50,000 inhabitants. As in other regions of China, farmers are by far the most affected population group.

== Eponymy ==
The condition was named after Russian military physicians Evgeny Vladimirovich Bek (1865–1915) and Nicolai Ivanowich Kashin (1825–1872). Because of varied transliteration from Cyrillic script into the Latin script of both German orthography and English orthography, the disease name has been spelled variously as Kashin–Beck disease, Kashin-Bek disease, and Kaschin-Beck disease. The noneponymous names endemic osteoarthritis, osteoarthritis deformans endemica, and osteoarthritis deformans have also been used.

== See also ==
- Iodine deficiency in China
