= Nutritional muscular dystrophy =

Livestock disease from selenium or vitamin E deficiency

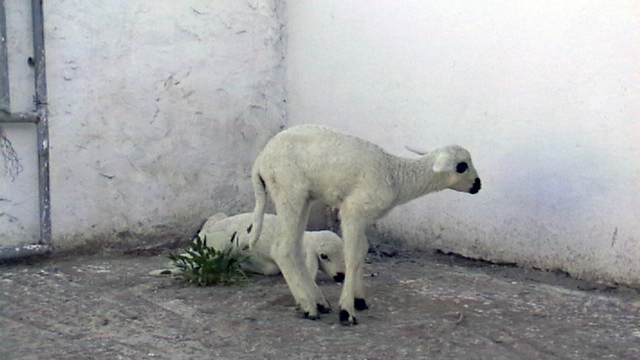
Typical stance of affected lambs, with arched back

Nutritional Muscular Dystrophy (Nutritional Myopathy or White Muscle Disease) is a disease caused by a deficiency of selenium and vitamin E in dietary intake. Soils that contain low levels of selenium produce forages and grains that are deficient in selenium. Similarly, if the forage is of low quality or is not stored properly, it may be deficient in vitamin E. If an animal consumes this type of diet without additional supplementation they become susceptible to this disease. This condition often affects young ruminants, such as calves and lambs.

Selenium and vitamin E are antioxidants. Therefore, deficiencies of these nutrients lead to oxidative damage to cells within the body. The muscle cells are the most vulnerable to damage in livestock species.

== Clinical symptoms ==
The oxidative damage causes degeneration of muscles, in particular those within the skeletal and cardiac systems. If the cardiac muscles are impaired the animal may exhibit signs of respiratory distress. While deterioration of skeletal muscles results in stiffness, weakness, and recumbency.

== Treatment & prevention ==
If the diet is deficient, supplement with selenium and/or vitamin E. Injections can be given to treat the condition or as a preventative measure.

== Horses ==
In equids, it is most common in the first twelve months of life. Neonatal foals born to dams that are selenium-deficient often develop the condition. There are two forms: peracute and subacute. The peracute form is characterized by recumbency, tachypnea, dyspnea, myalgia, cardiac arrhythmias, and rapid death. The subacute form causes weakness, fasciculations, cramping, and stiffness of muscles, which can lead to recumbency, as well as a stilted gait, dysphagia, ptyalism, and a weak suckle. It may be treated with selenium supplementation, but there is a 30–45% mortality rate. Other sequelae include aspiration pneumonia, failure of passive transfer, and stunting of growth.

Clinical laboratory changes include evidence of rhabdomyolysis (elevated CK and AST, myoglobinuria) and low blood selenium levels. On necropsy, muscles are pale with areas of necrosis and edema evidenced as white streaks.

Horses may also develop a more chronic delayed form of the disease called Neuroaxonal Dystrophy (NAD) or Equine Degenerative Myeloencephalopathy (EDM). EDM is a more severe form of NAD. The diseases are characterized by the damage and degeneration of the central nervous system. This disease process is heritable in certain breed bloodlines, such as Quarter Horse, Appaloosa, Morgan, Lusitano, and Arabian. It is hypothesized that horses develop this disease continuum because they have a defect in the uptake or utilization of Vitamin E and therefore have a higher baseline requirement.

== Sheep (stiff lamb disease) ==
In lambs, the disease typically occurs between 3 and 8 weeks of age, but may occur in older lambs as well. Progressive paralysis occurs, which is evident through the following symptoms: arched back, difficulty moving and an open shouldered stance. Cardiac failure may occur in two forms: sudden heart failure or gradual cardiac failure characterized by lung anemia that causes death due to suffocation.

Ewes may be given an injection of vitamin E/selenium prior to lambing to prevent deficiencies in lambs. In areas, such as Ontario, where lambs are highly susceptible to the condition, management practices should include vitamin E/selenium injections.

Two affected lambs, about one-month-old, falling into recumbency after one or two minutes standing

An older lamb, same symptoms

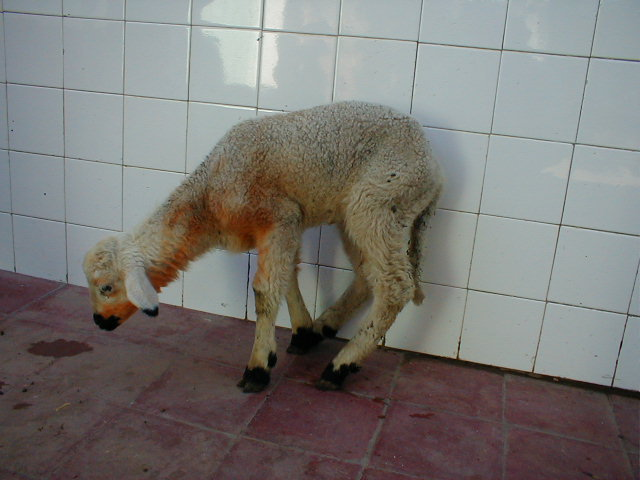
Disease in another lamb

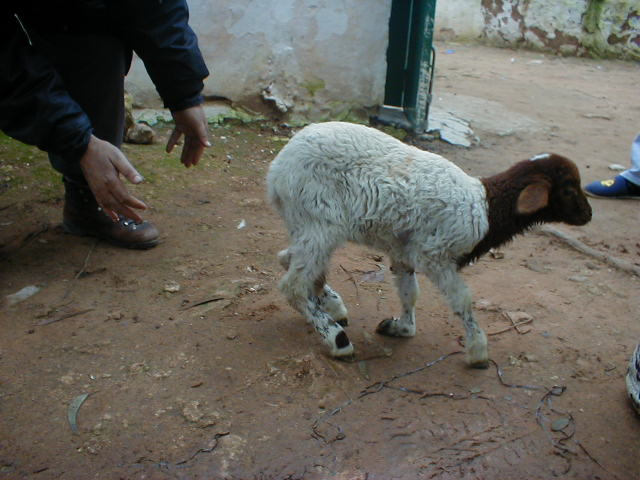
Another lamb

== Cattle ==
typical standing difficulties in a heifer who had run intensively after escaping out of its pen (as explained by the owner in Moroccan Arabic)

In dairy breeds, the disease may occur in calves between birth and 4 months of age. In rustic breeds or beef cattle, heifers and young steers up to 12 months of age can be affected. In calves, muscles in the upper portion of the front legs and the hind legs are degraded, causing the animal to have a stiff gait, and it may have difficulty standing. The disease may also present in the form of respiratory distress.

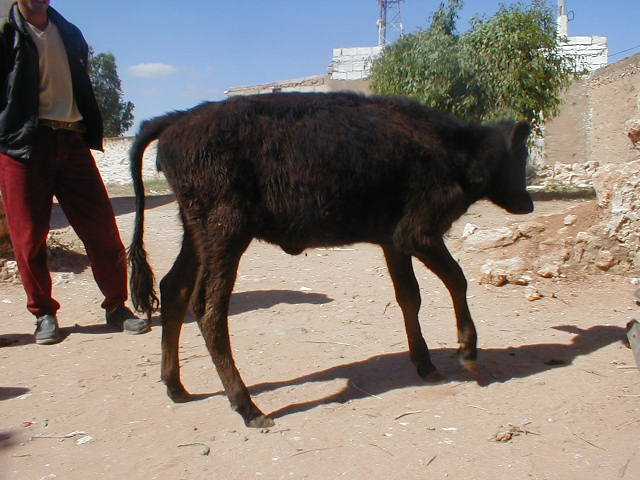
Disease in a heifer

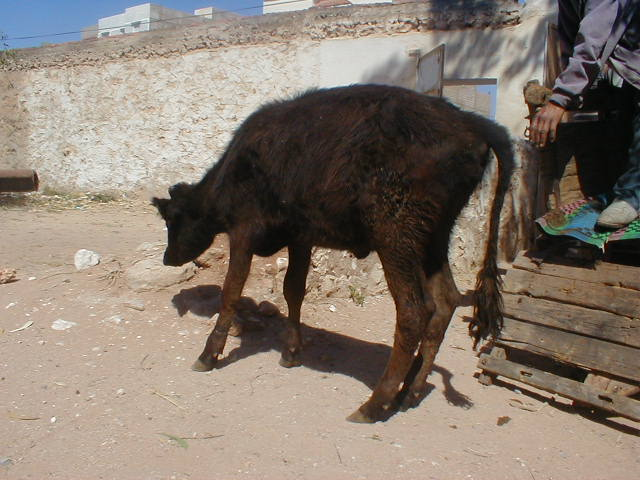
Same heifer
