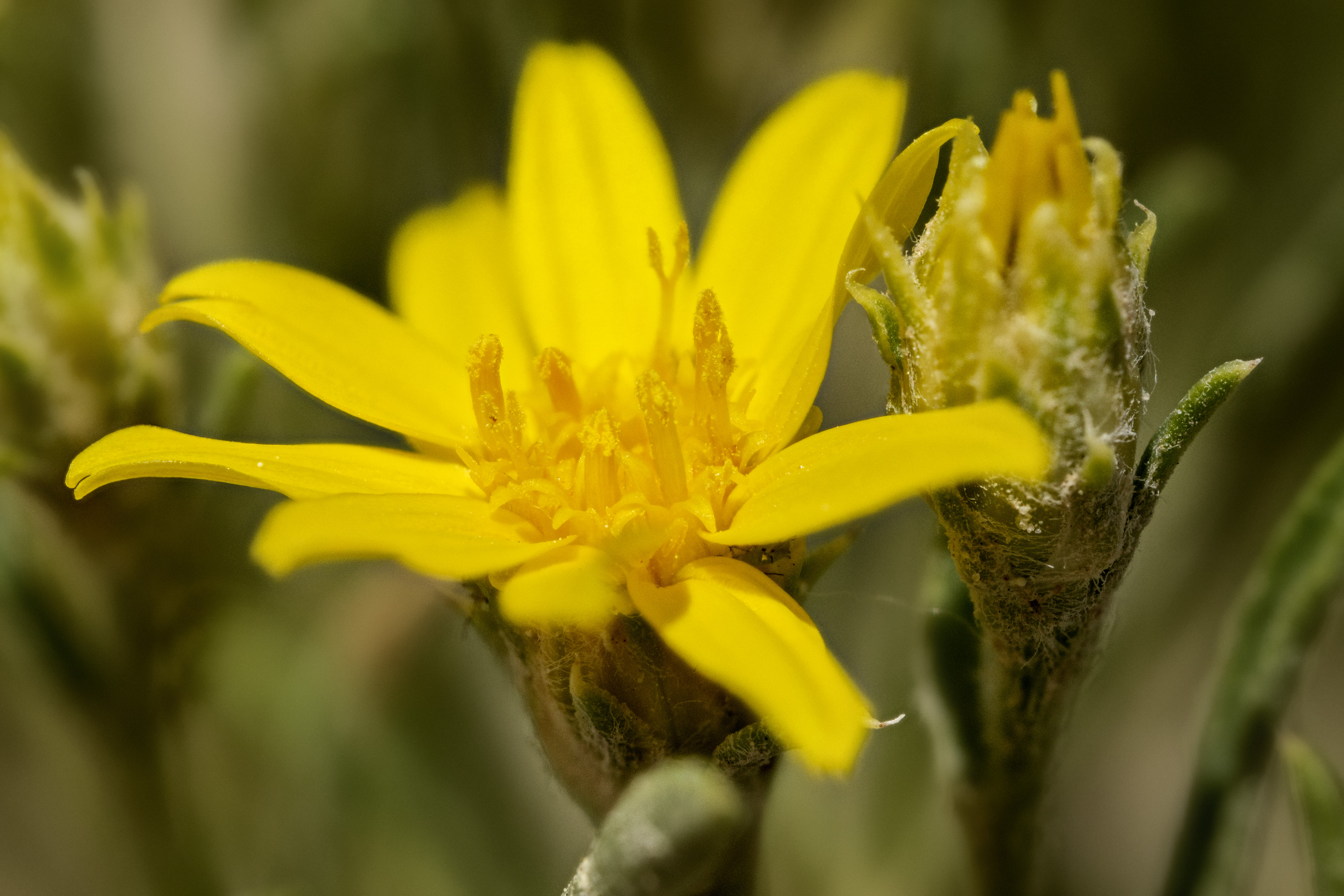
- Oönopsis multicaulis

Scientific classification
- Kingdom: Plantae
- Clade: Tracheophytes
- Clade: Angiosperms
- Clade: Eudicots
- Clade: Asterids
- Order: Asterales
- Family: Asteraceae
- Subfamily: Asteroideae
- Tribe: Astereae
- Subtribe: Machaerantherinae
- Genus: Oonopsis (Nutt.) Greene

Synonyms
- Oönopsis alternate spelling; Haplopappus sect. Oonopsis (Nutt.) H.M.Hall; Stenotus sect. Oonopsis Nutt.

= Oonopsis =

Genus of flowering plants

Oonopsis, or false goldenweed, is a genus of flowering plants in the family Asteraceae.

Species

- Oonopsis engelmannii (A.Gray) Greene - Kansas, Colorado
- Oonopsis foliosa Greene - Colorado
- Oonopsis multicaulis (Nutt.) Greene - Wyoming, Montana, Nebraska, South Dakota
- Oonopsis wardii (A.Gray) Greene - Wyoming, Colorado
