= Methylselenocysteine =

Names
- Systematic IUPAC name 3-(Methylselanyl)-L-alanine
- Other names Se-methylseleno-L-cysteine; L-Methylselenocysteine; Se-Methylselenocysteine

Identifiers
CAS Number	26046-90-2
3D model (JSmol)	Interactive image
ChEBI	CHEBI:27812
ChemSpider	129633
ECHA InfoCard	100.209.682
KEGG	C05689
PubChem CID	147004
UNII	TWK220499Z
CompTox Dashboard (EPA)	DTXSID801020160
- InChI: InChI=1S/C4H9NO2Se/c1-8-2-3(5)4(6)7/h3H,2,5H2,1H3,(H,6,7)/t3-/m0/s1 Key: XDSSPSLGNGIIHP-VKHMYHEASA-N; InChI=1/C4H9NO2Se/c1-8-2-3(5)4(6)7/h3H,2,5H2,1H3,(H,6,7)/t3-/m0/s1 Key: XDSSPSLGNGIIHP-VKHMYHEABS
- SMILES: C[Se]C[C@@H](C(=O)O)N

Properties
Chemical formula	C_{4}H_{9}NO_{2}Se
Molar mass	182.092 g·mol^{−1}
- Except where otherwise noted, data are given for materials in their standard state (at 25 °C [77 °F], 100 kPa). Infobox references

Methylselenocysteine (Me-Sec), also known as Se-methylselenocysteine (SeMSC), is an analog of S-methylcysteine in which the sulfur atom is replaced with a selenium atom.

== Occurrence ==
Methylselenocysteine is found in many vegetables: "as much as 80% of the total selenium" found in Allium species (onion, leek, garlic, ramps) Brassica species (broccoli, radish, Brussels sprouts, cabbage), and milk vetch (Astragalus species, Fabaceae) is present as Se-methylselenocysteine. It is also present in selenized yeast (Saccharomyces cerevisiae grown in a high-selenium culture).

=== Biosynthesis ===
In plants it is produced by a dedicated selenocysteine methyltransferase. Adding inorganic selenium to the soil increases the expression of the gene in plants.

In yeast it is also made by a selenomethyltransferase, though as no specific enzyme has been identified, it is possible that this happens via a promiscuous reaction of another enzyme. (After all, yeast does not even have the regular tRNA pathway for producing selenocysteine.)

=== Function ===
Me-Sec activates a number of transcriptional factors in plants, leading to higher production of secondary metabolites including capsaicin in chili pepper; carotenoid, phenols, glucosinolates, and sulforaphane in Brassica.

== Dietary aspects ==
The bioavailability of selenium from Se-methylselenocysteine, "is likely to be similar to that from other organic selenium compounds." Specifically, "it is converted via the action of β-lyase, to methylselenol and then to hydrogen selenide," which is also the key metabolite derived from all other common forms of selenium. But EFSA concluded that "given the absence of human studies on Se-methylselenocysteine, the relatively sparse database on the bioavailability of selenium from this source and the limited data on the safety of this source compared with other selenium compounds, the Upper Limit for selenium defined by the Scientific Committee on Food cannot be used for judging its safety."

== Health claims ==
It is an inhibitor of DMBA-induced mammary tumors and a "chemopreventive agent that blocks cell cycle progression and proliferation of premalignant mammary lesions and induces apoptosis of cancer cell lines in culture."

Apoptosis has been proposed as the most plausible mechanism for the chemopreventive activities of selenocompounds. Se-Methylselenocysteine was more efficient at inducing apoptosis than selenite, but was less toxic. The "selenite-induced cell death could be derived from necrosis rather than apoptosis, since selenite did not significantly induce several apoptotic phenomena, including the activation of caspase-3."

In the Nutritional Prevention of Cancer Trial, selenized yeast resulted in "a reduction in the incidence of prostate cancer and in total cancer incidence"; subsequent anticancer studies using selenomethionine did not show any benefit against cancer; but, selenized yeast contains both selenomethionine and methylselenocysteine.
