= Glutathione-ascorbate cycle =

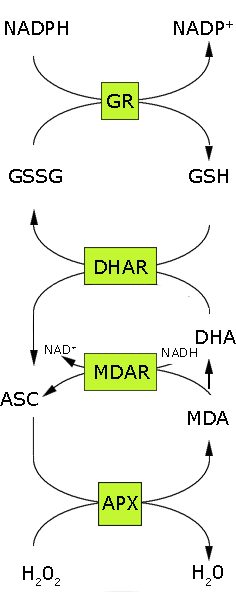
The glutathione-ascorbate cycle. Abbreviations are defined in the text.

The ascorbate-glutathione cycle, sometimes Foyer-Halliwell-Asada pathway, is a metabolic pathway that detoxifies hydrogen peroxide (H_{2}O_{2}), a reactive oxygen species that is produced as a waste product in metabolism. The cycle involves the antioxidant metabolites: ascorbate, glutathione and NADPH and the enzymes linking these metabolites.

In the first step of this pathway, H_{2}O_{2} is reduced to water by ascorbate peroxidase (APX) using ascorbate (ASC) as the electron donor. The oxidized ascorbate (monodehydroascorbate, MDA) is regenerated by monodehydroascorbate reductase (MDAR). However, monodehydroascorbate is a radical and if not rapidly reduced it disproportionates into ascorbate and dehydroascorbate (DHA). Dehydroascorbate is reduced to ascorbate by dehydroascorbate reductase (DHAR) at the expense of GSH, yielding oxidized glutathione (GSSG). Finally GSSG is reduced by glutathione reductase (GR) using NADPH as the electron donor. Thus ascorbate and glutathione are not consumed; the net electron flow is from NADPH to H_{2}O_{2}. The reduction of dehydroascorbate may be non-enzymatic or catalysed by proteins with dehydroascorbate reductase activity, such as glutathione S-transferase omega 1 or glutaredoxins.

In plants, the glutathione-ascorbate cycle operates in the cytosol, mitochondria, plastids and peroxisomes. Since glutathione, ascorbate and NADPH are present in high concentrations in plant cells it is assumed that the glutathione-ascorbate cycle plays a key role for H_{2}O_{2} detoxification. Nevertheless, other enzymes (peroxidases) including peroxiredoxins and glutathione peroxidases, which use thioredoxins or glutaredoxins as reducing substrates, also contribute to H_{2}O_{2} removal in plants.

== See also ==
- Antioxidant
- Oxidative stress
- Peroxidases
