= Lignin-modifying enzyme =

Lignin-modifying enzymes (LMEs) are various types of enzymes produced by fungi and bacteria that catalyze the breakdown of lignin, a biopolymer commonly found in the cell walls of plants. The terms ligninases and lignases are older names for the same class, but the name "lignin-modifying enzymes" is now preferred, given that these enzymes are not hydrolytic but rather oxidative (electron withdrawing) by their enzymatic mechanisms. LMEs include peroxidases, such as lignin peroxidase (EC 1.11.1.14), manganese peroxidase (EC 1.11.1.13), versatile peroxidase (EC 1.11.1.16), and many phenoloxidases of the laccase type.

LMEs have been known to be produced by many species of white rot basidiomycetous fungi, including: Phanerochaete chrysosporium, Ceriporiopsis subvermispora, Trametes versicolor, Phlebia radiata, Pleurotus ostreatus and Pleurotus eryngii.

LMEs are produced not only by wood-white rotting fungi but also by litter-decomposing basidiomycetous fungi such as Agaricus bisporus (common button mushroom), and many Coprinus and Agrocybe species. The brown-rot fungi, which are able to colonize wood by degrading cellulose, are only able to partially degrade lignin.

Some bacteria also produce LMEs, although fungal LMEs are more efficient in lignin degradation. Fungi are thought to be the most substantial contributors to lignin degradation in natural systems.

LMEs and cellulases are crucial to ecologic cycles (for example, growth/death/decay/regrowth, the carbon cycle, and soil health) because they allow plant tissue to be decomposed quickly, releasing the matter therein for reuse by new generations of life. LMEs are also crucial to a number of different industries.

== Industrial applications ==
Lignin-modifying enzymes have been actively used in the paper and pulp industry for the last decade. They were used in the industry shortly after they were discovered to have both detoxifying and decolorizing properties; properties that the pulp industry spends over $100 million USD annually on to pursue. Although these enzymes have been applied to industry for the last ten years, optimal and robust fermentative processes have not been established. There is an area of active research as scientists believe that the lack of optimal conditions for these enzymes are limiting industrial exploitation.

Lignin-modifying enzymes benefit industry as they can break down lignin; a common waste product of the paper and pulp industry. These enzymes have been used in the refinement of poplar as lignin inhibits the enzymatic hydrolysis of treated poplar and Lignin-modifying enzymes can efficiently degrade the lignin thus fixing this problem.

Another use of lignin modifying enzymes is the optimization of plant biomass use. Historically, only a small fraction of plant biomass use could actually be extracted from pulp sources leaving the majority of the plants as waste products. Due to Lignin, the plant waste is relatively inert towards degradation and causes the large accumulation of waste products. LMEs can effectively break it down into other aromatic compounds.

LMEs were initially used for the bleaching of waste effluent. Now there are several patented processes that make use of these enzymes for pulp bleaching, many of which are still under development.

The environmental industry has interest in using LMEs for the degradation of xenobiotic compounds. There is active research into the detoxification of herbicides by LMEs. Trametes versicolor was shown to effectively degraded Glyphosate in vitro.

== Bacterial lignin-modifying enzymes ==
Although much research has been done to understand fungal LMEs, only recently has more focus been placed on characterizing these enzymes in bacteria. The main LMEs in both fungi and bacteria are peroxidases and laccases.

Although bacteria lack homologs to the most common fungal peroxidases (lignin peroxidase, manganese peroxidase, and versatile peroxidase), many produce dye decolourizing peroxidases (DyP-type peroxidases). Bacteria from a variety of classes express DyP peroxidases, including Gammaproteobacteria, Bacillota, and Actinomycetota. Peroxidases depolymerize lignin by oxidation using hydrogen peroxide. Fungal peroxidases have higher oxidizing power than bacterial DyP-type peroxidases studied so far, and are able to degrade more complex lignin structures. DyP-type peroxidases have been found to work on a large range of substrates, including synthetic dyes, monophenolic compounds, lignin-derived compounds, and alcohols.

Laccases, which are multicopper oxidases, are another class of enzymes found in both bacteria and fungi which have significant lignin-degrading properties. Laccases degrade lignin by oxidation using oxygen. Laccases are also widely distributed among bacterial species, including Bacillus subtilis, Caulobacter crescentus, Escherichia coli and Mycobacterium tuberculosum. Like DyP-type peroxidases, bacterial laccases have a wide substrate range.

There is interest in using bacterial laccases and DyP peroxidases for industry applications, biotechnology and bioremediation because of the greater ease of manipulation of bacterial genomes and gene expression compared to fungi. The wide range of substrates for these types of enzymes also increases the range of processes they may be used in. These processes include pulp processing, textile dye modification, decontamination of waste water and production of pharmaceutical building blocks. Furthermore, bacterial laccases function at higher temperatures, alkalinity, and salt concentrations than fungal laccases, making them more suitable for industrial use.

Both intracellular and extracellular bacterial DyP-type peroxidases and laccases have been identified, suggesting that some are used as intracellular enzymes while others are secreted to degrade compounds in the environment. However, their roles in bacterial physiology and their natural physiological substrates have yet to be detailed.

== See also ==
- Chitinase
