= Ascorbate peroxidase =

Enzyme

L-ascorbate peroxidase
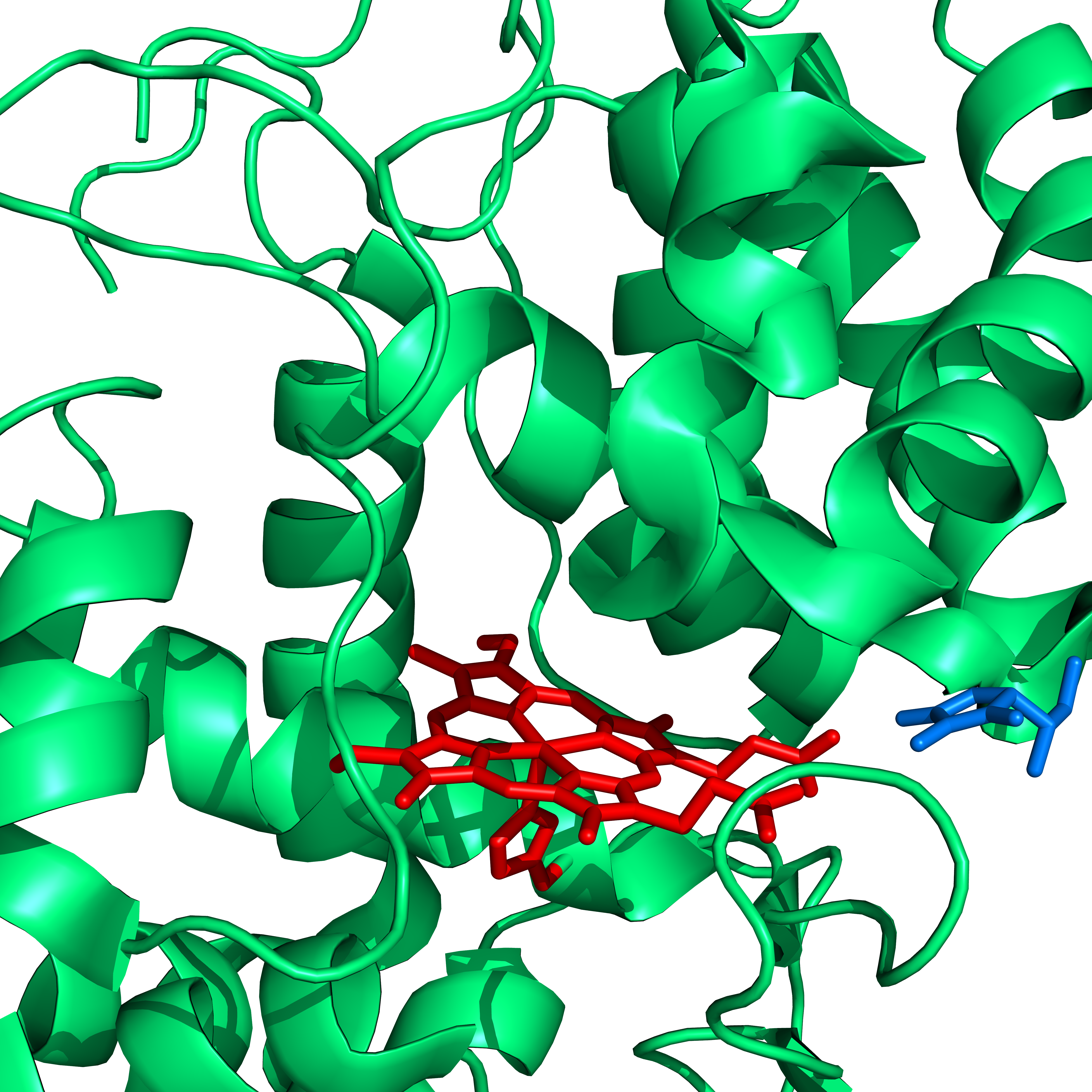
- Structure of ascorbate peroxidase in complex with ascorbate (in blue); a histidine ligand (in red) coordinates to the iron of the heme group (also in red). Image taken from PDB 1OAF and created using Pymol

Identifiers
- EC no.: 1.11.1.11
- CAS no.: 72906-87-7

Databases
- IntEnz: IntEnz view
- BRENDA: BRENDA entry
- ExPASy: NiceZyme view
- KEGG: KEGG entry
- MetaCyc: metabolic pathway
- PRIAM: profile
- PDB structures: RCSB PDB PDBe PDBsum
- Gene Ontology: AmiGO / QuickGO
Search
- PMC: articles
- PubMed: articles
- NCBI: proteins

Ascorbate peroxidase (or L-ascorbate peroxidase, APX or APEX) (EC 1.11.1.11) is an enzyme that catalyzes the overall chemical reaction:

ascorbic acid
H_{2}O_{2}
2 H_{2}O
H_{2}O_{2}
2 H_{2}O
dehydroascorbic acid

It is a member of the family of heme-containing peroxidases. Heme peroxidases catalyse the hydrogen peroxide-dependent oxidation of a wide range of different, usually organic, substrates in biology.

This enzyme belongs to the family of oxidoreductases, specifically those acting on a peroxide as acceptor (peroxidases). The systematic name of this enzyme class is L-ascorbate:hydrogen-peroxide oxidoreductase. Other names in common use include L-ascorbic acid peroxidase, L-ascorbic acid-specific peroxidase, ascorbate peroxidase, and ascorbic acid peroxidase. This enzyme participates in the ascorbate and aldarate metabolism. APXs are important in cellular antioxidant networks in photosynthetic organisms; they are the primary component of the ascorbate-glutathione cycle and are important for peroxide scavenging and redox signaling.

== Reaction ==
In the catalytic cycle, the immediate one-electron oxidized product is monodehydroascorbate (MDHA). MDHA is either enzymatically reduced back to ascorbate by monodehydroascorbate reductase (MDAR) or two MDHA molecules disproportionate to ascorbate and dehydroascorbate (DHA).

== Overview ==
Ascorbate-dependent peroxidase activity was first reported in 1979, more than 150 years after the first observation of peroxidase activity in horseradish plants and almost 40 years after the discovery of the closely related cytochrome c peroxidase enzyme.

Peroxidases have been classified into three types (class I, class II and class III): ascorbate peroxidases is a class I peroxidase enzyme. APXs catalyze the H_{2}O_{2}-dependent oxidation of ascorbate in plants, algae and certain cyanobacteria. APX has high sequence identity to cytochrome c peroxidase, which is also a class I peroxidase enzyme. Under physiological conditions, the immediate product of the reaction, the monodehydroascorbate radical, is reduced back to ascorbate by a monodehydroascorbate reductase (monodehydroascorbate reductase (NADH)) enzyme. In the absence of a reductase, two monodehydroascorbate radicals disproportionate rapidly to dehydroascorbic acid and ascorbate. APX is an integral component of the glutathione-ascorbate cycle.

== Substrate specificity ==
APX enzymes show high specificity for ascorbate as an electron donor, but most APXs will also oxidise other organic substrates that are more characteristic of the class III peroxidases (such as horseradish peroxidase), in some cases at rates comparable to that of ascorbate itself. This means that defining an enzyme as an APX is not straightforward, but is usually applied when the specific activity for ascorbate is higher than that for other substrates. Some proteins from the APX family lack the ascorbate-binding amino acid residues suggesting that they might oxidize other molecules than ascorbate.

== Mechanism ==
Most of the information on mechanism comes from work on the pea cytosolic and soybean cytosolic enzymes. The mechanism of oxidation of ascorbate is achieved by means of an oxidized Compound I intermediate, which is subsequently reduced by substrate in two, sequential single electron transfer steps (equations [1]–[3], where HS = substrate and S^{•} = one electron oxidized form of substrate).

APX follows the typical heme-peroxidase mechanism with high-valent iron intermediates:

1. Formation of Compound I: APX reacts with H_{2}O_{2} to form Compound I - where the heme is oxidized to Fe^{4+} = O (oxyferryl). This produces a porphyrin pi-organic cation radical.
  1. APX + H_{2}O_{2} → Compound I + H_{2}O [1]
2. Formation of Compound II: Through a one electron reduction, Compound I is reduced by substrate (HS) to form Compound II; Compound II accepts a second electron from ascorbate to regenerate the ferric resting state. This is s sequential single-electron transfer steps.
  1. Compound I + HS → Compound II + S^{•} [2]
  2. Compound II + HS → APX + S^{•} + H_{2}O [3]

In ascorbate peroxidase, Compound I is a transient (green) species and contains a high-valent iron species (known as ferryl heme, Fe^{IV}) and a porphyrin pi-cation radical, as found in horseradish peroxidase. Compound II contains only the ferryl heme. Spectroscopic and kinetic work on plant APXs supports these intermediates and sequential one electron transfers.

== Structural information ==
The structure of pea cytosolic APX was reported in 1995. The binding interaction of soybean cytosolic APX with its physiological substrate, ascorbate and with a number of other substrates are also known.

As of late 2007, 12 structures have been solved for this class of enzymes, with PDB accession codes 1APX, 1IYN, 1OAF, 1OAG, 1V0H, 2CL4, 2GGN, 2GHC, 2GHD, 2GHE, 2GHH, and 2GHK.

== See also ==
- Cytochrome c peroxidase
- Manganese peroxidase
