= Glutathione peroxidase 4 =

Mammalian protein found in Homo sapiens

GPX4
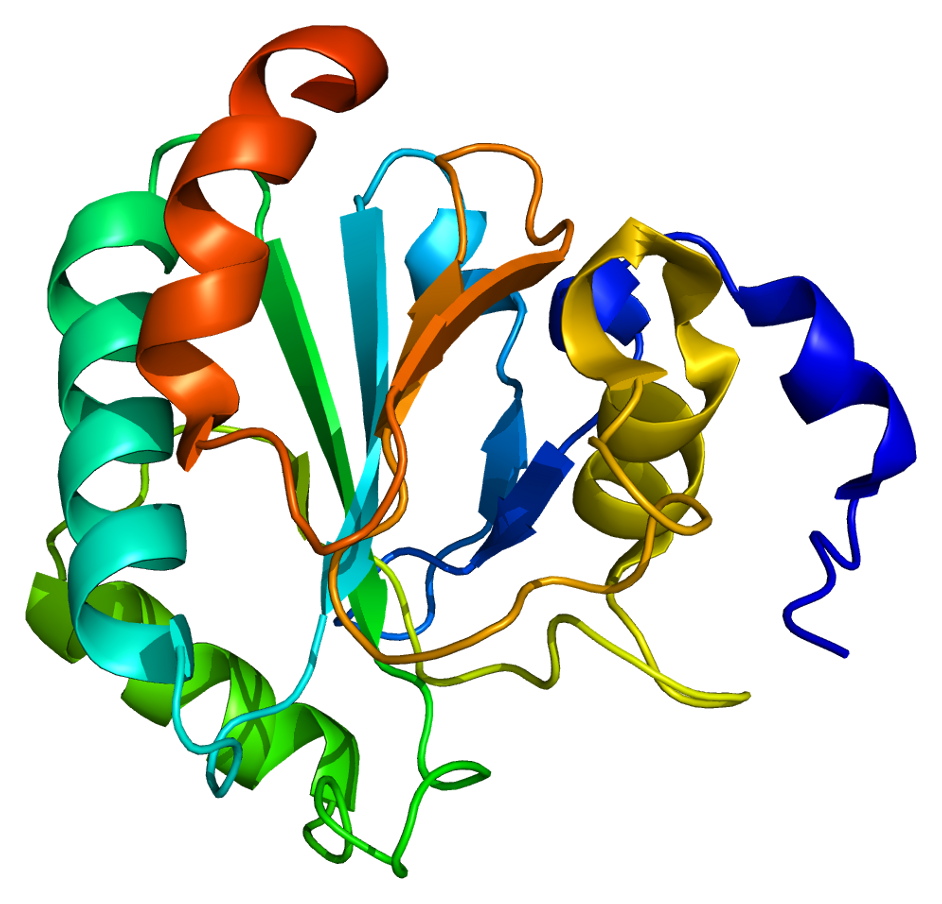

Identifiers
- Aliases: GPX4, GPx-4, GSHPx-4, MCSP, PHGPx, snGPx, snPHGPx, SMDS, glutathione peroxidase 4
- External IDs: OMIM: 138322; MGI: 104767; GeneCards: GPX4
Available structures
PDB	Ortholog search: PDBe RCSB
PDB	List of PDB id codes 2GS3, 2OBI
Enzyme activity
EC #	BRENDA	ExPASy	KEGG	MetaCyc
1.11.1.9	↗	↗	↗	↗
1.11.1.12	↗	↗	↗	↗

Gene location (Human)
Chr.	Chromosome 19 (human)
Band	19p13.3	Start	1,103,994 bp
Band	19p13.3	End	1,106,791 bp

Gene location (Mouse)
Chr.	Chromosome 10 (mouse)
Band	10 C1|10 39.72 cM	Start	79,883,000 bp
Band	10 C1|10 39.72 cM	End	79,892,273 bp
RNA expression pattern
Bgee	Human / Mouse (ortholog); Top expressed in: left testis; right testis; adipose tissue; retinal pigment epithelium; abdominal fat; subcutaneous adipose tissue; olfactory zone of nasal mucosa; left adrenal cortex; pituitary gland; right adrenal cortex / Top expressed in: spermatid; proximal tubule; spermatocyte; bone marrow; white adipose tissue; right kidney; layer of retina; neural layer of retina; dentate gyrus of hippocampal formation granule cell; cerebellar cortex; More reference expression data
BioGPS	n/a
Gene ontology
Molecular function	phospholipid-hydroperoxide glutathione peroxidase activity; oxidoreductase activity; peroxidase activity; glutathione peroxidase activity; identical protein binding; protein binding; selenium binding
Cellular component	cytosol; extracellular exosome; cytoplasm; nucleus; nucleoplasm; mitochondrion; nuclear envelope; protein-containing complex
Biological process	response to oxidative stress; multicellular organism development; lipoxygenase pathway; phospholipid metabolic process; cellular oxidant detoxification; protein polymerization; chromatin organization; glutathione metabolic process; spermatogenesis; ageing; response to estradiol; long-chain fatty acid biosynthetic process; regulation of inflammatory response; negative regulation of ferroptosis
Sources:Amigo / QuickGO
Orthologs
Databases	NCBI: entry; OMA: entry
Species	Human	Mouse
Entrez	2879	625249
Ensembl	ENSG00000167468	ENSMUSG00000075706
UniProt	P36969	Q76LV0; O70325
RefSeq (mRNA)	NM_002085; NM_001039847; NM_001039848; NM_001367832	NM_001037741; NM_008162; NM_001367995
RefSeq (protein)	NP_001034936; NP_001034937; NP_002076; NP_001354761	NP_001032830.2; NP_001032830; NP_032188; NP_001354924
Location (UCSC)	Chr 19: 1.1 – 1.11 Mb	Chr 10: 79.88 – 79.89 Mb
PubMed search
- Wikidata
View/Edit Human	View/Edit Mouse

Glutathione peroxidase 4, also known as GPX4, is an enzyme that in humans is encoded by the GPX4 gene. GPX4 is a phospholipid hydroperoxidase that protects cells against membrane lipid peroxidation.

== Discovery ==
GPX4 was first discovered in biochemistry laboratories of the University of Padua, where it was described as an enzyme capable of protecting against peroxidation. Its role as an inhibitor of cellular death was only discovered in 2012 by a research group Columbia University.

== Function ==
The antioxidant enzyme glutathione peroxidase 4 (GPX4) belongs to the family of glutathione peroxidases, which consists of 8 known mammalian isoenzymes (GPX1–8). GPX4 catalyzes the reduction of hydrogen peroxide, organic hydroperoxides, and lipid peroxides at the expense of reduced glutathione and functions in the protection of cells against oxidative stress. The oxidized form of glutathione (glutathione disulfide), which is generated during the reduction of hydroperoxides by GPX4, is recycled by glutathione reductase and NADPH/H^{+}. GPX4 differs from the other GPX family members in terms of its monomeric structure, a less restricted dependence on glutathione as reducing substrate, and the ability to reduce lipid-hydroperoxides inside biological membranes.

Inactivation of GPX4 leads to an accumulation of lipid peroxides, resulting in ferroptotic cell death. Mutations in GPX4 cause spondylometaphyseal dysplasia. In vitro studies suggest that GPX4 protects cells against cold-induced cell death.

Therapy-resistant cancer cells in a high-mesenchymal state depend on a lipid peroxidase pathway to suppress ferroptosis, indicating a critical survival mechanism in this cellular context. Drug-tolerant persister cells exhibit a specific dependency on the lipid hydroperoxidase GPX4 for survival; inhibition of GPX4 induces ferroptotic cell death in these cells.

== Structure ==
Mammalian GPX1, GPX2, GPX3, and GPX4 (this protein) have been shown to be selenium-containing enzymes, whereas GPX6 is a selenoprotein in humans with cysteine-containing homologues in rodents. In selenoproteins, the amino acid selenocysteine is inserted in the nascent polypeptide chain during the process of translational recoding of the UGA stop codon. GPX4 shares the amino acid motif of selenocysteine, glutamine, and tryptophan (catalytic triad) with other glutathione peroxidases.

== Reaction mechanism ==
GPX4 catalyzes the following reaction:

- 2 glutathione + lipid–hydroperoxide → glutathione disulfide + lipid–alcohol + H_{2}O

This reaction occurs at the selenocysteine within the catalytic center of GPX4. During the catalytic cycle of GPX4, the active selenol (-SeH) is oxidized by peroxides to selenenic acid (-SeOH), which is then reduced with glutathione (GSH) to an intermediate selenodisulfide (-Se-SG). GPX4 is eventually reactivated by a second glutathione molecule, releasing glutathione disulfide (GS-SG).

== Subcellular distribution of isoforms ==
In mouse and rat, three distinct GPX4 isoforms with different subcellular localization are produced through alternative splicing and transcription initiation; cytosolic GPX4, mitochondrial GPX4 (mGPX4), and nuclear GPX4 (nGPX4). Cytosolic GPX4 has been identified as the only GPX4 isoform being essential for embryonic development and cell survival. The GPX4 isoforms mGPX4 and nGPX4 have been implicated in spermatogenesis and male fertility. In humans, experimental evidence for alternative splicing exists; alternative transcription initiation and the cleavage sites of the mitochondrial and nuclear transit peptides need to be experimentally verified.

== Animal models ==
Knockout mice of GPX4 die at embryonic day 8 and conditional inducible deletion in adult mice (neurons) results in degeneration and death in less than a month. Targeted disruption of the mitochondrial GPX4 isoform (mGPX4) caused infertility in male mice and disruption of the nuclear GPX4 isoform (nGPX4) reduced the structural stability of sperm chromatin, yet both knockout mouse models (for mGPX4 and nGPX4) were fully viable. Surprisingly, knockout of GPX4 heterozygously in mice (GPX4^{+/−}) increases their median life span. Knockout studies with GPX1, GPX2, or GPX3 deficient mice showed that cytosolic GPX4 is so far the only glutathione peroxidase that is indispensable for embryonic development and cell survival. As mechanisms to dispose of both hydrogen peroxide and lipid hydroperoxides are essential to life, this indicates that in contrast to the multiple metabolic pathways that can be utilized to dispose of hydrogen peroxide, pathways for the disposal of lipid hydroperoxides are limited.

While mammals have only one copy of the GPX4 gene, fish have two copies, GPX4a and GPX4b. The GPX4's appear to play a greater role in the fish GPX system than in mammals. For example, in fish GPX4 activity contributes to a greater extent to total GPX activity, GPX4a is the most highly expressed selenoprotein mRNA (in contrast to mammals where it is GPX1 mRNA) and GPX4a appears to be highly inducible to changes within the cellular environment, such as changes in methylmercury and selenium status.

== Pathology ==
The interaction of GPX4 with the autophagic degradation pathway further modulates cell's response to oxidative stress. Impaired GPX4 function plays a role in tumorigenesis, neurodegeneration, infertility, inflammation, immune disorders, and ischemia-reperfusion injury. Additionally, the R152H mutation in GPX4 is involved in the development of Sedaghatian-type spinal metaphyseal dysplasia, a rare and fatal disease in newborn babies.
