= Methylarsonate reductase =

methylarsonate reductase

Identifiers
- EC no.: 1.20.4.2

Databases
- IntEnz: IntEnz view
- BRENDA: BRENDA entry
- ExPASy: NiceZyme view
- KEGG: KEGG entry
- MetaCyc: metabolic pathway
- PRIAM: profile
- PDB structures: RCSB PDB PDBe PDBsum
- Gene Ontology: AmiGO / QuickGO
Search
- PMC: articles
- PubMed: articles
- NCBI: proteins

In enzymology, a methylarsonate reductase (EC 1.20.4.2) is an enzyme that catalyzes the chemical reaction

methylarsonate + 2 glutathione $\rightleftharpoons$ methylarsonite + glutathione disulfide + H_{2}O

Thus, the two substrates of this enzyme are methylarsonate and glutathione, whereas its 3 products are methylarsonite, glutathione disulfide, and H_{2}O.

This enzyme belongs to the family of oxidoreductases, specifically those acting on phosphorus or arsenic in donor with disulfide as acceptor. The systematic name of this enzyme class is gluthathione:methylarsonate oxidoreductase. This enzyme is also called MMA(V) reductase.
