= GDOR =

GDOR may refer to:

- Georgia Department of Revenue, a revenue agency
- Glutathione dehydrogenase (ascorbate), an enzyme
