= Haem peroxidase =

Protein family

Peroxidase

Identifiers
- Symbol: peroxidase
- Pfam: PF00141
- InterPro: IPR002016
- PROSITE: PDOC00394
- SCOP2: 1hsr / SCOPe / SUPFAM
- CDD: cd00314
Available protein structures:
- PDB: IPR002016 PF00141 (ECOD; PDBsum)
- AlphaFold: IPR002016; PF00141

Fungal peroxidase extension region

Identifiers
- Symbol: Peroxidase_ext
- Pfam: PF11895
- InterPro: IPR024589
Available protein structures:
- PDB: IPR024589 PF11895 (ECOD; PDBsum)
- AlphaFold: IPR024589; PF11895

Haem peroxidases (or heme peroxidases) are haem-containing enzymes that use hydrogen peroxide as the electron acceptor to catalyse a number of oxidative reactions. Most haem peroxidases follow the reaction scheme:

Fe^{3+} + H_{2}O_{2} $\rightleftharpoons$ [Fe^{4+}=O]R' (Compound I) + H_{2}O

[Fe^{4+}=O]R' + substrate → [Fe^{4+}=O]R (Compound II) + oxidized substrate

[Fe^{4+}=O]R + substrate → Fe^{3+} + H_{2}O + oxidized substrate

In this mechanism, the enzyme reacts with one equivalent of H_{2}O_{2} to give [Fe^{4+}=O]R' (compound I). This is a two-electron oxidation/reduction reaction in which H_{2}O_{2} is reduced to water, and the enzyme is oxidized. One oxidizing equivalent resides on iron, giving the oxyferryl intermediate, and in many peroxidases the porphyrin (R) is oxidized to the porphyrin pi-cation radical (R'). Compound I then oxidizes an organic substrate to give a substrate radical and Compound II, which can then oxidize a second substrate molecule.

Haem peroxidases include two superfamilies: one found in bacteria, fungi, and plants, and the second found in animals. The first one can be viewed as consisting of 3 major classes:

- Class I, the intracellular peroxidases, includes: cytochrome c peroxidase (CCP), a soluble protein found in the mitochondrial electron transport chain, where it probably protects against toxic peroxides; ascorbate peroxidase (AP), the main enzyme responsible for hydrogen peroxide removal in chloroplasts and cytosol of higher plants; and bacterial catalase- peroxidases, exhibiting both peroxidase and catalase activities. It is thought that catalase-peroxidase provides protection to cells under oxidative stress.
- Class II consists of secretory fungal peroxidases: ligninases, or lignin peroxidases (LiPs), and manganese-dependent peroxidases (MnPs). These are monomeric glycoproteins involved in the degradation of lignin. In MnP, Mn^{2+} serves as the reducing substrate. Class II proteins contain four conserved disulphide bridges and two conserved calcium-binding sites.
- Class III consists of the secretory plant peroxidases, which have multiple tissue-specific functions: e.g., removal of hydrogen peroxide from chloroplasts and cytosol; oxidation of toxic compounds; biosynthesis of the cell wall; defence responses towards wounding; indole-3-acetic acid (IAA) catabolism; ethylene biosynthesis; and so on. Class III proteins are also monomeric glycoproteins, containing four conserved disulphide bridges and two calcium ions, although the placement of the disulphides differs from class II enzymes.

The crystal structures of a number of these proteins show that they share the same architecture - two all-alpha domains between which the haem group is embedded.

Another family of haem peroxidases is the DyP-type peroxidase family.
