= Phospholipid-hydroperoxide glutathione peroxidase =

phospholipid-hydroperoxide glutathione peroxidase

Identifiers
- EC no.: 1.11.1.12
- CAS no.: 97089-70-8

Databases
- IntEnz: IntEnz view
- BRENDA: BRENDA entry
- ExPASy: NiceZyme view
- KEGG: KEGG entry
- MetaCyc: metabolic pathway
- PRIAM: profile
- PDB structures: RCSB PDB PDBe PDBsum
- Gene Ontology: AmiGO / QuickGO
Search
- PMC: articles
- PubMed: articles
- NCBI: proteins

In enzymology, a phospholipid-hydroperoxide glutathione peroxidase (EC 1.11.1.12) is an enzyme that catalyzes the chemical reaction

2 glutathione + a lipid hydroperoxide $\rightleftharpoons$ glutathione disulfide + lipid + 2 H_{2}O

Thus, the two substrates of this enzyme are glutathione and lipid hydroperoxide, whereas its 3 products are glutathione disulfide, lipid, and H_{2}O.

This enzyme belongs to the family of oxidoreductases, to be specific those acting on a peroxide as acceptor (peroxidases). The systematic name of this enzyme class is glutathione:lipid-hydroperoxide oxidoreductase. Other names in common use include peroxidation-inhibiting protein, PHGPX, peroxidation-inhibiting protein: peroxidase, glutathione, (phospholipid hydroperoxide-reducing), phospholipid hydroperoxide glutathione peroxidase, hydroperoxide glutathione peroxidase, or glutathione peroxidase 4 (GPX4). This enzyme participates in glutathione metabolism.

== Structural studies ==
As of late 2007, two structures have been solved for this class of enzymes, with PDB accession codes 2GS3 and 2OBI.
