= GPX2 =

GPX2 may refer to:

- GPX2 (gene)
- Former name of GP2X games console
