= GSTO1 =

Mammalian protein found in Homo sapiens

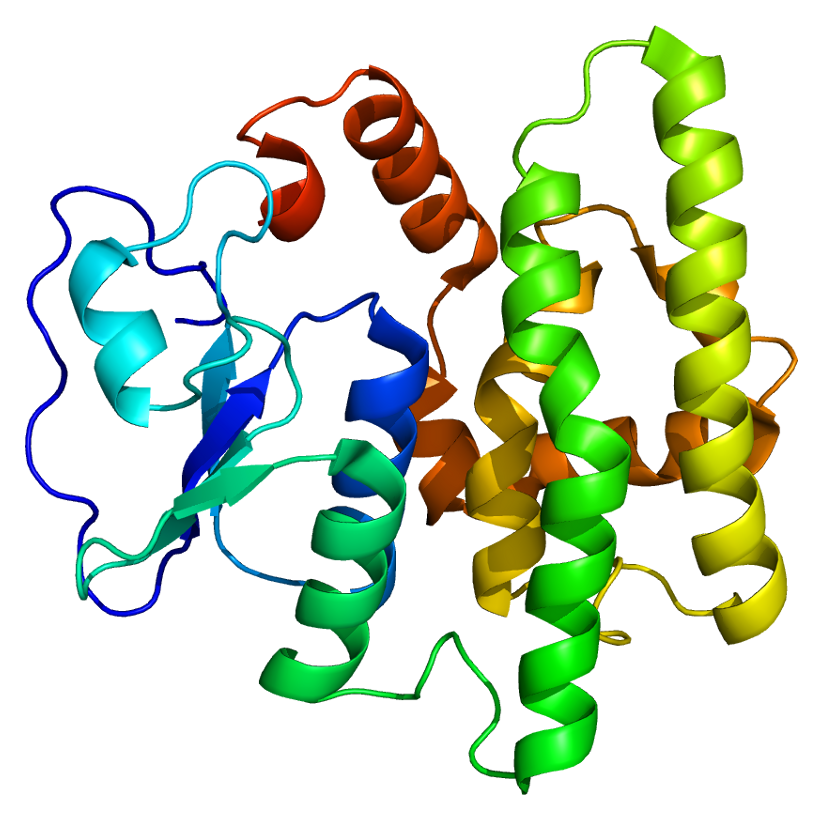
Available structures
PDB	Ortholog search: PDBe RCSB
PDB	List of PDB id codes 1EEM, 3LFL, 3VLN, 4IS0

Identifiers
- Aliases: GSTO1, GSTO 1-1, GSTTLp28, HEL-S-21, P28, SPG-R, glutathione S-transferase omega 1
- External IDs: OMIM: 605482; MGI: 1342273; HomoloGene: 37971; GeneCards: GSTO1; OMA:GSTO1 - orthologs
- EC number: 1.20.4.2

Gene location (Human)
Chr.	Chromosome 10 (human)
Band	10q25.1	Start	104,235,356 bp
Band	10q25.1	End	104,267,459 bp

Gene location (Mouse)
Chr.	Chromosome 19 (mouse)
Band	19|19 D1	Start	47,843,409 bp
Band	19|19 D1	End	47,853,229 bp
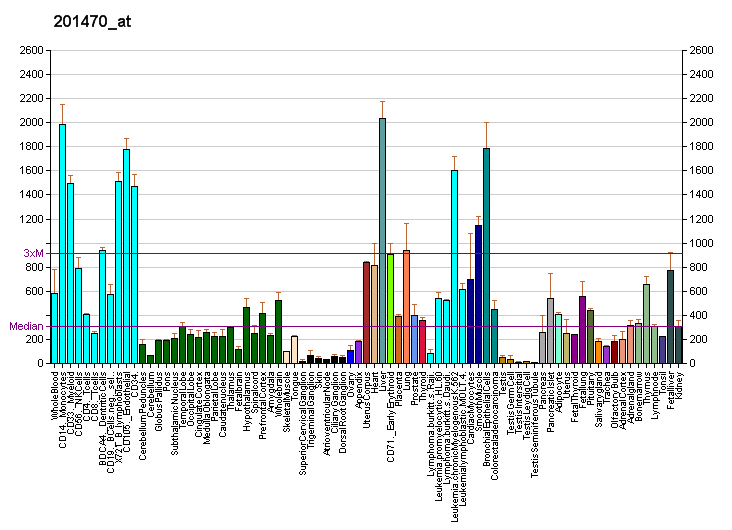
RNA expression pattern
Bgee	Human / Mouse (ortholog); Top expressed in: monocyte; right lobe of liver; right lung; middle temporal gyrus; kidney tubule; right auricle of heart; left ventricle; apex of heart; right ventricle; gingival epithelium / Top expressed in: conjunctival fornix; corneal stroma; ciliary body; gastric mucosa; mucous cell of stomach; epithelium of stomach; superior surface of tongue; pyloric antrum; duodenum; esophagus; More reference expression data
BioGPS	More reference expression data
Gene ontology
Molecular function	transferase activity; glutathione dehydrogenase (ascorbate) activity; protein binding; methylarsonate reductase activity; oxidoreductase activity; glutathione transferase activity
Cellular component	cytoplasm; cytosol; extracellular exosome
Biological process	xenobiotic catabolic process; regulation of cardiac muscle contraction by regulation of the release of sequestered calcium ion; negative regulation of ryanodine-sensitive calcium-release channel activity; positive regulation of ryanodine-sensitive calcium-release channel activity; methylation; cellular response to arsenic-containing substance; positive regulation of skeletal muscle contraction by regulation of release of sequestered calcium ion; metabolism; regulation of release of sequestered calcium ion into cytosol by sarcoplasmic reticulum; glutathione derivative biosynthetic process; L-ascorbic acid metabolic process; cellular oxidant detoxification; glutathione metabolic process; toxin catabolic process; interleukin-12-mediated signaling pathway
Sources:Amigo / QuickGO
Orthologs
Species	Human	Mouse
Entrez	9446	14873
Ensembl	ENSG00000148834	ENSMUSG00000025068
UniProt	P78417; Q5TA02	O09131
RefSeq (mRNA)	NM_004832; NM_001191002; NM_001191003	NM_010362
RefSeq (protein)	NP_001177931; NP_001177932; NP_004823	NP_034492
Location (UCSC)	Chr 10: 104.24 – 104.27 Mb	Chr 19: 47.84 – 47.85 Mb
PubMed search
- Wikidata
View/Edit Human	View/Edit Mouse

Glutathione S-transferase omega-1 is an enzyme that in humans is encoded by the GSTO1 gene.

This gene encodes a member of the theta class glutathione S-transferase-like (GSTTL) protein family. In mouse, the encoded protein acts as a small stress response protein, likely involved in cellular redox homeostasis. This protein has dehydroascorbate reductase activity and may function in the glutathione-ascorbate cycle as part of antioxidant metabolism.
