= Glutathione reductase =

Enzyme

GSR
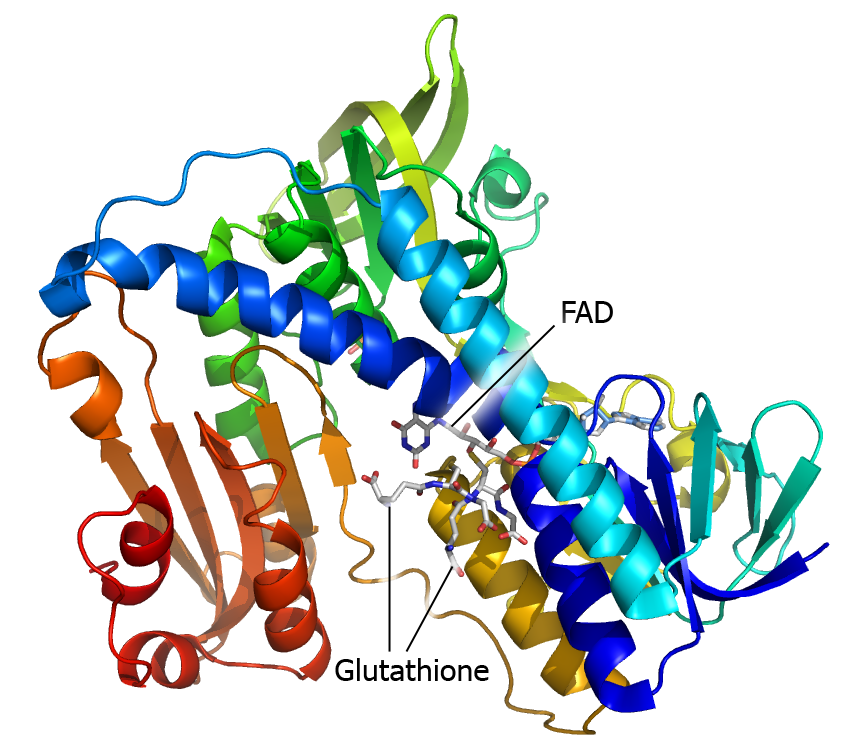
Available structures
PDB	Ortholog search: PDBe RCSB
PDB	List of PDB id codes 1BWC, 1DNC, 1GRA, 1GRB, 1GRE, 1GRF, 1GRG, 1GRH, 1GRT, 1GSN, 1K4Q, 1XAN, 2AAQ, 2GH5, 2GRT, 3DJG, 3DJJ, 3DK4, 3DK8, 3DK9, 3GRS, 3GRT, 4GR1, 4GRT, 5GRT, 1ALG, 3SQP

Identifiers
- Aliases: GSR, HEL-75, HEL-S-122m, glutathione reductase, glutathione-disulfide reductase, GR, GSRD
- External IDs: OMIM: 138300; MGI: 95804; HomoloGene: 531; GeneCards: GSR; OMA:GSR - orthologs

Gene location (Human)
Chr.	Chromosome 8 (human)
Band	8p12	Start	30,678,066 bp
Band	8p12	End	30,727,846 bp

Gene location (Mouse)
Chr.	Chromosome 8 (mouse)
Band	8 A4|8 20.69 cM	Start	34,142,551 bp
Band	8 A4|8 20.69 cM	End	34,188,191 bp
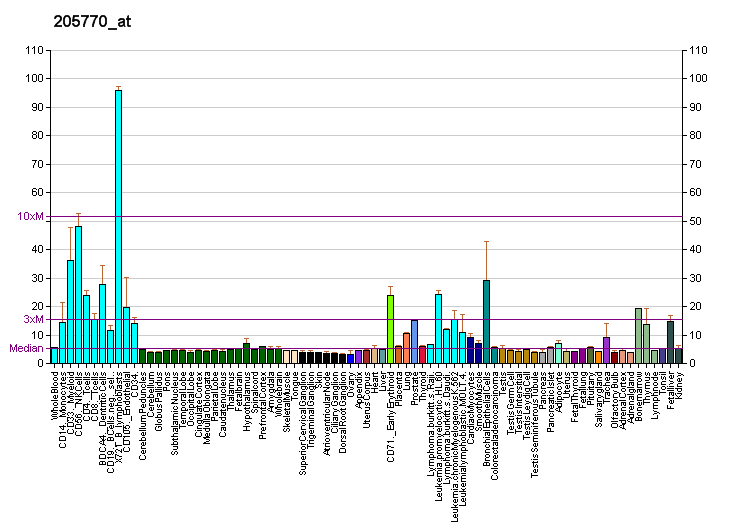
RNA expression pattern
Bgee	Human / Mouse (ortholog); Top expressed in: pylorus; islet of Langerhans; epithelium of nasopharynx; renal medulla; mucosa of pharynx; mucosa of paranasal sinus; seminal vesicula; rectum; duodenum; palpebral conjunctiva / Top expressed in: granulocyte; tibiofemoral joint; cumulus cell; mucous cell of stomach; right kidney; stroma of bone marrow; molar; proximal tubule; epithelium of stomach; pyloric antrum; More reference expression data
BioGPS	More reference expression data
Gene ontology
Molecular function	flavin adenine dinucleotide binding; glutathione-disulfide reductase (NADPH) activity; NADP binding; oxidoreductase activity; oxidoreductase activity, acting on a sulfur group of donors, NAD(P) as acceptor; electron transfer activity
Cellular component	cytoplasm; cytosol; mitochondrial matrix; mitochondrion; extracellular exosome; external side of plasma membrane
Biological process	nucleobase-containing small molecule interconversion; glutathione metabolic process; cell redox homeostasis; cellular oxidant detoxification; cellular response to oxidative stress; electron transport chain
Sources:Amigo / QuickGO
Orthologs
Species	Human	Mouse
Entrez	2936	14782
Ensembl	ENSG00000104687	ENSMUSG00000031584
UniProt	P00390	P47791
RefSeq (mRNA)	NM_001195104; NM_000637; NM_001195102; NM_001195103	NM_010344
RefSeq (protein)	NP_000628; NP_001182031; NP_001182032; NP_001182033	NP_034474
Location (UCSC)	Chr 8: 30.68 – 30.73 Mb	Chr 8: 34.14 – 34.19 Mb
PubMed search
- Wikidata
View/Edit Human	View/Edit Mouse

Glutathione reductase (GR) also known as glutathione-disulfide reductase (GSR) is an enzyme that in humans is encoded by the GSR gene. Glutathione reductase (EC 1.8.1.7) catalyzes the reduction of glutathione disulfide (GSSG) to the sulfhydryl form glutathione (GSH), which is a critical molecule in resisting oxidative stress and maintaining the reducing environment of the cell. Glutathione reductase functions as dimeric disulfide oxidoreductase and uses flavin adenine dinucleotide and nicotinamide adenine dinucleotide phosphate (NADPH) to reduce one molar equivalent of GSSG to two molar equivalents of GSH:

glutathione disulfide
+ NADPH
H^{+}
H^{+}
2
glutathione
+ NAD^{+}

The glutathione reductase is conserved between all kingdoms. In bacteria, yeasts, and animals, one glutathione reductase gene is found; however, in plant genomes, two GR genes are encoded. Drosophila and trypanosomes do not have any GR at all. In these organisms, glutathione reduction is performed by either the thioredoxin or the trypanothione system, respectively.

== Function ==
glutathione-disulfide reductase
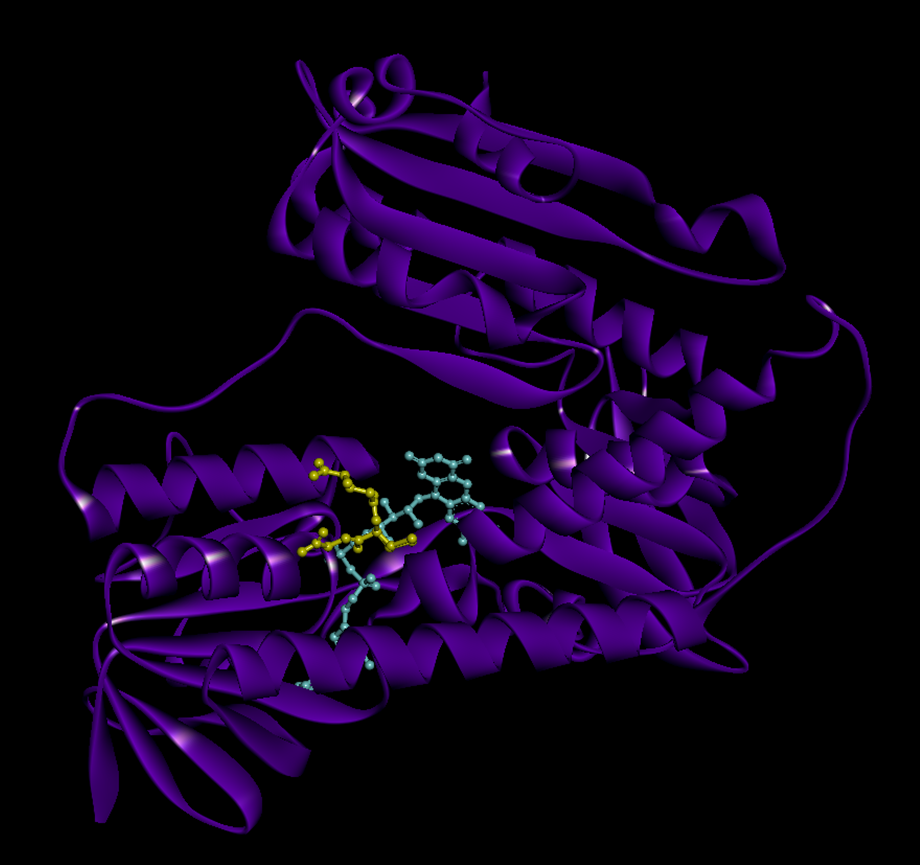
- Human GSR with bound glutathione and FADH

Identifiers
- EC no.: 1.8.1.7
- CAS no.: 9001-48-3

Databases
- IntEnz: IntEnz view
- BRENDA: BRENDA entry
- ExPASy: NiceZyme view
- KEGG: KEGG entry
- MetaCyc: metabolic pathway
- PRIAM: profile
- PDB structures: RCSB PDB PDBe PDBsum
- Gene Ontology: AmiGO / QuickGO
Search
- PMC: articles
- PubMed: articles
- NCBI: proteins

Glutathione plays a key role in maintaining proper function and preventing oxidative stress in human cells. It can scavenge hydroxyl radicals, singlet oxygen, and various electrophiles. Reduced glutathione reduces the oxidized form of the enzyme glutathione peroxidase, which in turn reduces hydrogen peroxide (H_{2}O_{2}), a dangerously reactive species within the cell. In addition, it plays a key role in the metabolism and clearance of xenobiotics, acts as a cofactor in certain detoxifying enzymes, participates in transport, and regenerates antioxidants such and Vitamins E and C to their reactive forms. The ratio of GSSG/GSH present in the cell is a key factor in properly maintaining the oxidative balance of the cell, that is, it is critical that the cell maintains high levels of the reduced glutathione and a low level of the oxidized glutathione disulfide. This narrow balance is maintained by glutathione reductase, which catalyzes the reduction of GSSG to GSH.

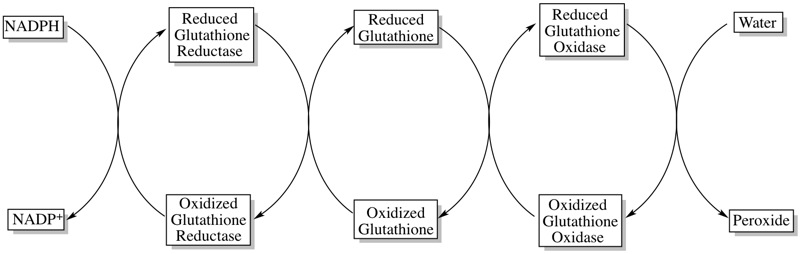
Reduced glutathione reductase, glutathione peroxidase and glutathione interact to reduce hydrogen peroxide to water, in order to protect the cell from oxidative damage. The rightmost arrow is reversed; it should be pointing up not down.

== Structure ==
Glutathione reductase from human erythrocytes is a homodimer consisting of 52kDa monomers, each containing 3 domains. GR exhibits single sheet, double layered topology where an anti-parallel beta-sheet is largely exposed to the solvent on one face while being covered by random coils on the other face. This includes and NADPH-binding Domain, FAD-binding domain(s) and a dimerization domain. Each monomer contains 478 residues and one FAD molecule. GR is a thermostable protein, retaining function up to 65 °C.

== Reaction mechanism ==
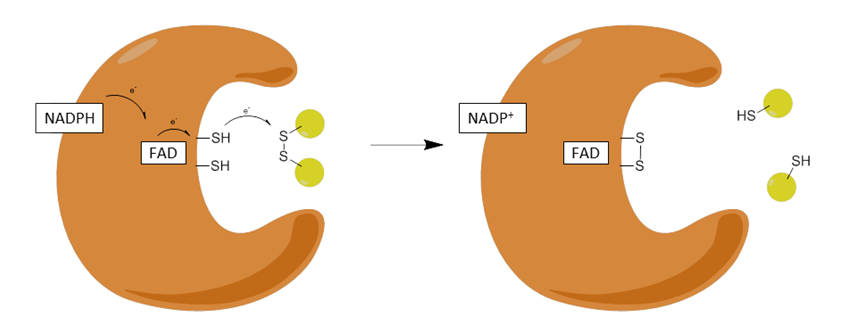
Graphical representation of overall reaction catalyzed by GR

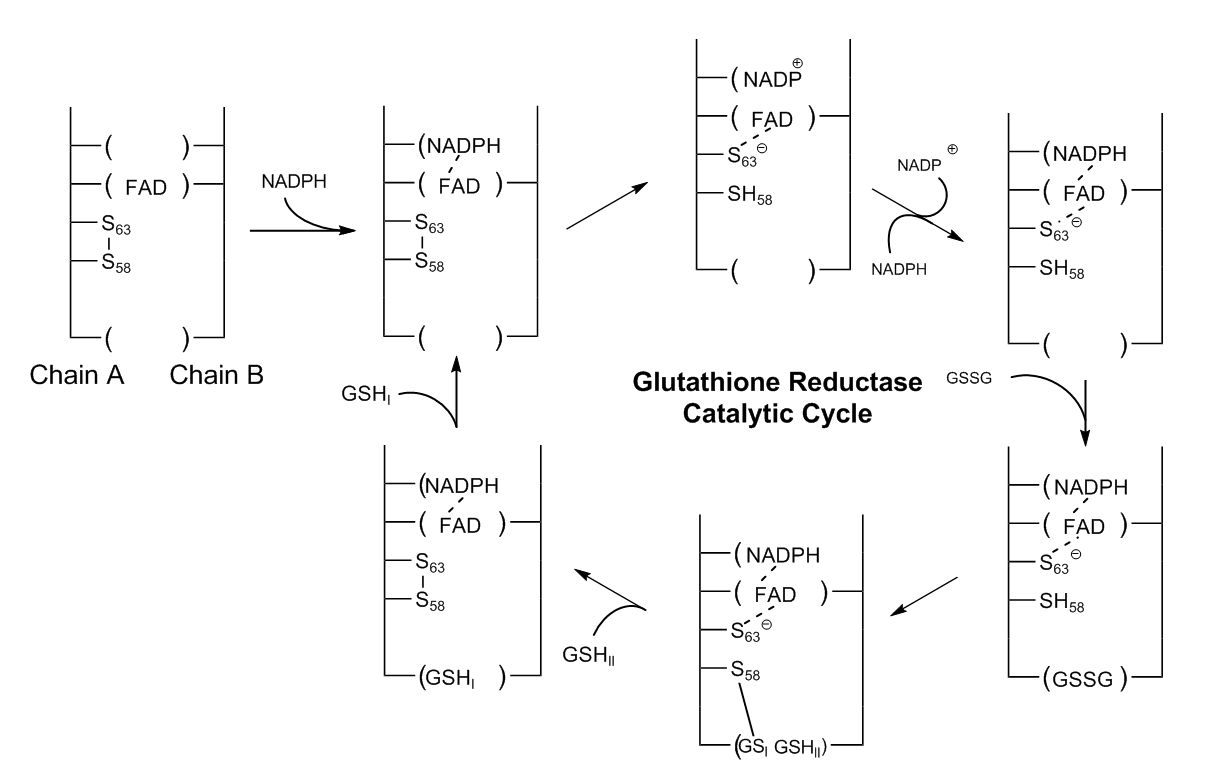
GR catalytic cycle

Steps:

1	NADPH binding to the oxidized enzyme
2	Reduction of FAD to FADH^{−} anion by NADPH
3	Reduced FADH^{−} anion collapses into a charge relay complex and reduces Cys_{58}-Cys_{63} disulfide
4	Oxidized Glutathione disulfide binds to the reduced enzyme and forms a mixed disulfide with Cys_{58} and releases one reduced glutathione
5	Cys_{63} attacks the mixed disulfide on Cys_{58} to release a reduced glutathione and reform the redox active disulfide

=== Reductive half ===
The action of GR proceeds through two distinct half reactions, a reductive half mechanism followed by an oxidative half. In the first half, NADPH reduces FAD present in GSR to produce a transient FADH^{−} anion. This anion then quickly breaks a disulfide bond of Cys_{58} - Cys_{63}, forming a short lived covalent bond a stable charge-transfer complex between the flavin and Cys_{63}. The now oxidized NADP+ is released and is subsequently replaced by a new molecule of NADPH. This is the end of the so-called reductive half of the mechanism.

=== Oxidative half ===
In the oxidative half of the mechanism, Cys_{63} nucleophilically attacks the nearest sulfide unit in the GSSG molecule (promoted by His_{467}), which creates a mixed disulfide bond (GS-Cys_{58}) and a GS^{−} anion. His_{467} of GSR then protonates the GS- anion to release the first molecule of GSH. Next, Cys_{63} nucleophilically attacks the sulfide of Cys_{58}, releasing a GS^{−} anion, which, in turn, picks up a solvent proton and is released from the enzyme, thereby creating the second GSH. So, for every GSSG and NADPH, two reduced GSH molecules are gained, which can again act as antioxidants scavenging reactive oxygen species in the cell.

== Inhibition ==
In vitro, glutathione reductase is inhibited by low concentrations of sodium arsenite and methylated arsenate metabolites, but in vivo, significant Glutathione Reductase inhibition by sodium arsenate has only been at 10 mg/kg/day. Glutathione reductase is also inhibited by some flavanoids, a class of pigments produced by plants.

== Clinical significance ==
GSH is a key cellular antioxidant and plays a major role in the phase 2 metabolic clearance of electrophilic xenobiotics. The importance of the GSH pathway and enzymes that affect this delicate balance is gaining an increased level of attention in recent years. Although glutathione reductase has been an attractive target for many pharmaceuticals, there have been no successful glutathione reductase related therapeutic compounds created to date. In particular, glutathione reductase appears to be a good target for anti-malarials, as the glutathione reductase of the malaria parasite Plasmodium falciparum has a significantly different protein fold than that of mammalian glutathione reductase. By designing drugs specific to p. falciparum it may be possible to selectively induce oxidative stress in the parasite, while not affecting the host.

There are two main classes of GR targeting compounds:

1. Inhibitors of GSSG binding, or dimerization: Reactive electrophiles such as gold compounds, and fluoronaphthoquinones.
2. Drugs which use glutathione reductase to regenerate, such as redox cyclers. Two examples of these types of compounds are Methylene blue and Naphthoquinone.

Clinical trials performed in Burkina Faso have revealed mixed results when treating malaria with Naphthoquinones

In cells exposed to high levels of oxidative stress, like red blood cells, up to 10% of the glucose consumption may be directed to the pentose phosphate pathway (PPP) for production of the NADPH needed for this reaction. In the case of erythrocytes, if the PPP is non-functional, then the oxidative stress in the cell will lead to cell lysis and anemia.

Lupus is an autoimmune disorder in which patients produce an elevated quantity of antibodies that attack DNA and other cell components. In a recent study, a single nucleotide polymorphism (SNP) in the Glutathione Reductase gene was found to be highly associated with lupus in African Americans in the study. African Americans with lupus have also been shown to express less reduced glutathione in their T cells. The study's authors believe that reduced glutathione reductase activity may contribute to the increased production of reactive oxygen in African Americans with lupus.

In mice, glutathione reductase has been implicated in the oxidative burst, a component of the immune response. The oxidative burst is a defense mechanism in which neutrophils produce and release reactive oxidative species in the vicinity of bacteria or fungi to destroy the foreign cells. Glutathione Reductase deficient neutrophils were shown to produce a more transient oxidative burst in response to bacteria than neutrophils that express GR at ordinary levels. The mechanism of Glutathione Reductase in sustaining the oxidative burst is still unknown.

=== Deficiency ===
Glutathione reductase deficiency is a rare disorder in which the glutathione reductase activity is absent from erythrocytes, leukocytes or both. In one study this disorder was observed in only two cases in 15,000 tests for glutathione reductase deficiency performed over the course of 30 years. In the same study, glutathione reductase deficiency was associated with cataracts and favism in one patient and their family, and with severe unconjugated hyperbilirubinemia in another patient. It has been proposed that the glutathione redox system (of which glutathione reductase is a part) is almost exclusively responsible for the protecting of eye lens cells from hydrogen peroxide because these cells are deficient in catalase, an enzyme which catalyzes the breakdown of hydrogen peroxide, and the high rate of cataract incidence in glutathione reductase deficient individuals.

Some patients exhibit deficient levels of glutathione activity as a result of not consuming enough riboflavin in their diets. Riboflavin is a precursor for FAD, whose reduced form donates two electron to the disulfide bond which is present in the oxidized form of glutathione reductase in order to begin the enzyme's catalytic cycle. In 1999, a study found that 17.8% of males and 22.4% of females examined in Saudi Arabia suffered from low glutathione reductase activity due to riboflavin deficiency.

=== Connection to favism ===
In favism, patients lack glucose-6-phosphate dehydrogenase, an enzyme in their pentose phosphate pathway that reduces NADP^{+} to NADPH while catalyzing the conversion of glucose-6-phosphate to 6-phosphoglucono-δ-lactone. Glucose-6-phosphate dehydrogenase deficient individuals have less NADPH available for the reduction of oxidized glutathione via glutathione reductase. Thus their basal ratio of oxidized to reduced glutathione is significantly higher than that of patients who express glucose-6-phosphate dehydrogenase, normally, making them unable to effectively respond to high levels of reactive oxygen species, which causes cell lysis.

== Monitoring glutathione reductase activity ==
The activity of glutathione reductase is used as indicator for oxidative stress. The activity can be monitored by the NADPH consumption, with absorbance at 340 nm, or the formed GSH can be visualized by Ellman's reagent. Alternatively the activity can be measured using roGFP (redox-sensitive Green Fluorescent Protein).

== In plants ==
As it does in human cells, glutathione reductase helps to protect plant cells from reactive oxygen species. In plants, reduced glutathione participates in the glutathione-ascorbate cycle in which reduced glutathione reduces dehydroascorbate, a reactive byproduct of the reduction of hydrogen peroxide. In particular, glutathione reductase contributes to plants' response to abiotic stress. The enzyme's activity has been shown to be modulated in response to metals, metalloids, salinity, drought, UV radiation and heat induced stress.

== History ==
Glutathione reductase was first purified in 1955 at Yale University by P. Janmeda. Janmeda also identified NADPH as the primary electron donor for the enzyme. Later groups confirmed the presence of FAD and the thiol group, and an initial mechanism was suggested for the mechanism in 1965. The initial (low resolution) structure of glutathione reductase was solved in 1977. This was quickly followed by a 3Å structure by Shulze et al. in 1978. Glutathione reductase has been studied exhaustively since these early experiments, and is subsequently one of the most well characterized enzymes to date.

== Interactive pathway map ==
Interactive pathway can be found here: pathway map
