= Glutathione peroxidase =

Enzyme family protecting the organism from oxidative damages

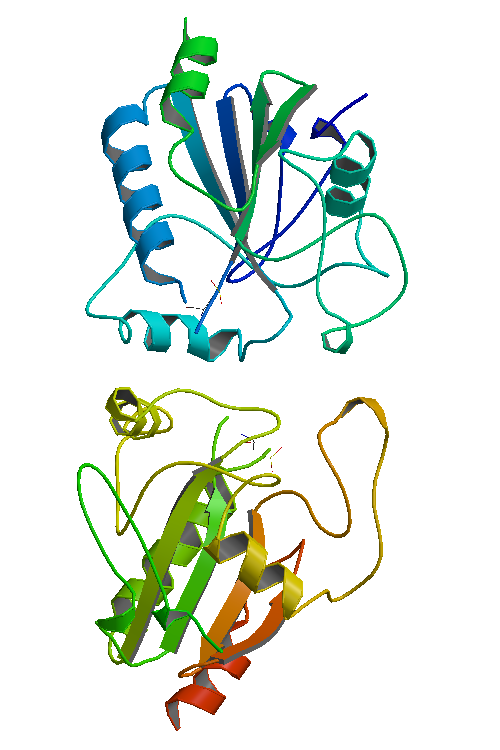
- Crystallographic structure of bovine glutathione peroxidase 1.

Identifiers
- EC no.: 1.11.1.9
- CAS no.: 9013-66-5

Databases
- BRENDA: enzyme data
- ExPASy: NiceZyme view
- KEGG: enzyme entry
- MetaCyc: metabolic pathway
- Rhea: reactions
- PDB structures: RCSB PDB PDBe PDBsum
- Gene Ontology: AmiGO / QuickGO
Search
- PMC: articles
- PubMed: articles
- NCBI: proteins

Glutathione peroxidase

Identifiers
- Symbol: GSHPx
- Pfam: PF00255
- InterPro: IPR000889
- PROSITE: PDOC00396
- SCOP2: 1gp1 / SCOPe / SUPFAM
Available protein structures:
- PDB: 2f8aB:14-128 1gp1A:19-133 IPR000889 PF00255 (ECOD; PDBsum)
- AlphaFold: IPR000889; PF00255

Glutathione peroxidase (GPx) (EC 1.11.1.9) is the general name of an enzyme family with peroxidase activity whose main biological role is to protect the organism from oxidative damage. The biochemical function of glutathione peroxidase is to reduce lipid hydroperoxides to their corresponding alcohols and to reduce free hydrogen peroxide to water.

Glutathione peroxidase was discovered in 1957 by Gordon C. Mills.

== Reaction ==
The main reaction that glutathione peroxidase catalyzes is:

2
glutathione
H_{2}O_{2}
2 H_{2}O
glutathione disulfide

The mechanism involves oxidation of the selenol of a selenocysteine residue by hydrogen peroxide. This process gives the derivative with a selenenic acid (RSeOH) group. The selenenic acid is then converted back to the selenol by a two step process that begins with reaction with glutathione (GSH) to form the GS-SeR and water. A second GSH molecule reduces the GS-SeR intermediate back to the selenol, releasing glutathione disulfide (GS-SG) as the by-product. A simplified representation is shown below:

RSeH + H_{2}O_{2} → RSeOH + H_{2}O
RSeOH + GSH → GS-SeR + H_{2}O
GS-SeR + GSH → GS-SG + RSeH

Glutathione reductase then reduces the oxidized glutathione to complete the cycle:

GS–SG + NADPH + H^{+} → 2 GSH + NADP^{+}.

== Human isozymes ==
Several isozymes are encoded by different genes, which vary in cellular location and substrate specificity. Glutathione peroxidase 1 (GPx1) is the most abundant version, found in the cytoplasm of nearly all mammalian tissues, whose preferred substrate is hydrogen peroxide. Glutathione peroxidase 4 (GPx4) has a high preference for lipid hydroperoxides; it is expressed in nearly every mammalian cell, though at much lower levels. Glutathione peroxidase 2 is an intestinal and extracellular enzyme, while glutathione peroxidase 3 is extracellular, especially abundant in plasma. So far, eight different isoforms of glutathione peroxidase (GPx1-8) have been identified in humans.

Gene	Locus	Enzyme
GPX1	Chr. 3 p21.3	glutathione peroxidase 1
GPX2	Chr. 14 q24.1	glutathione peroxidase 2 (gastrointestinal)
GPX3	Chr. 5 q23	glutathione peroxidase 3 (plasma)
GPX4	Chr. 19 p13.3	glutathione peroxidase 4 (phospholipid hydroperoxidase)
GPX5	Chr. 6 p21.32	glutathione peroxidase 5 (epididymal androgen-related protein)
GPX6	Chr. 6 p21	glutathione peroxidase 6 (olfactory)
GPX7	Chr. 1 p32	glutathione peroxidase 7
GPX8	Chr. 5 q11.2	glutathione peroxidase 8 (putative)

=== Structure of isozymes ===
Mammalian GPx1, GPx2, GPx3, and GPx4 have been shown to be selenium-containing enzymes, whereas GPx6 is a selenoprotein in humans with cysteine-containing homologues in rodents. GPx1, GPx2, and GPx3 are homotetrameric proteins, whereas GPx4 has a monomeric structure. As the integrity of the cellular and subcellular membranes depends heavily on glutathione peroxidase, its antioxidative protective system itself depends heavily on the presence of selenium.

== Animal models ==
Mice genetically engineered to lack glutathione peroxidase 1 (Gpx1^{−/−} mice) are grossly phenotypically normal and have normal lifespans, indicating this enzyme is not critical for life. However, Gpx1^{−/−} mice develop cataracts at an early age and exhibit defects in muscle satellite cell proliferation. Gpx1 ^{−/−} mice showed up to 16 dB higher auditory brainstem response (ABR) thresholds than control mice. After 110 dB noise exposure for one hour, Gpx1 ^{−/−} mice had up to 15 dB greater noise-induced hearing loss compared with control mice."

Mice with knockouts for GPX3 (GPX3^{−/−}) or GPX2 (GPX2^{−/−}) also develop normally

However, glutathione peroxidase 4 knockout mice die during early embryonic development. Some evidence, though, indicates reduced levels of glutathione peroxidase 4 can increase life expectancy in mice.

== Clinical significance ==
It has been shown that low levels of glutathione peroxidase as measured in the serum may be a contributing factor to vitiligo. Lower plasma glutathione peroxide levels were also observed in patients with type 2 diabetes with macroalbuminuria and this was correlated to the stage of diabetic nephropathy. In one study, the activity of glutathione peroxidase along with other antioxidant enzymes such as superoxide dismutase and catalase was not associated with coronary heart disease risk in women. Glutathione peroxidase activity was found to be much lower in patients with relapsing-remitting multiple sclerosis. One study has suggested that glutathione peroxidase and superoxide dismutase polymorphisms play a role in the development of celiac disease.

The activity of this enzyme has been reported to be decreased in case of copper deficiency in the liver and plasma.

== Evolution ==
GPxs are a key part of animal (including human) antioxidant defenses. They are also find in bacteria, plants, and fungi. GPx was the first selenoprotein discovered, with a highly reactive Sec residue at the active site. Comparison of GPx sequences from all these types of life suggest that the ancestral GPx did not contain selenium; instead, acquision of Sec happened early in animal evolution, before the sponges diverged from other animals.

Humans have eight Gpx genes, but only five of them contain Sec (GPX1, GPX2, GPX3, GPX4, GPX6). The non-existence of Sec in GPX7 and GPX8 appears to be universal among animals. The loss of Sec (by replacement with Cys) in GPX5 was, however, a relatively recent event that happened after the divergence of humans from rodents. Rodents have independently lost the Sec in Gpx6, but kept it in their version of Gpx5. Human GPX5 and rodent Gpx6 retain vestigial SECIS elements indicative of their past.

== Determination of activity ==
Activity of glutathione peroxidase is measured spectrophotometrically using several methods. A direct assay by linking the peroxidase reaction with glutathione reductase with measurement of the conversion of NADPH to NADP is widely used. The other approach is measuring residual GSH in the reaction with Ellman's reagent. Based on this, several procedures for measuring glutathione peroxidase activity were developed using various hydroperoxides as substrates for reduction, e.g. cumene hydroperoxide, tert-butyl hydroperoxide and hydrogen peroxide.

The other methods include the use of CUPRAC reagent with spectrophotometric detection of the reaction product or o-phtalaldehyde as a fluorescent reagent.

== See also ==
- Catalase
- Superoxide dismutase
- Glutathione reductase
- Selenium deficiency
