= Glutathione peroxidase 6 =

Protein-coding gene in the species Homo sapiens

GPX6

Identifiers
- Aliases: GPX6, GPX5p, GPXP3, GPx-6, GSHPx-6, dJ1186N24, dJ1186N24.1, glutathione peroxidase 6
- External IDs: OMIM: 607913; MGI: 1922762; GeneCards: GPX6
Enzyme activity
EC #	BRENDA	ExPASy	KEGG	MetaCyc
1.11.1.9	↗	↗	↗	↗

Gene location (Human)
Chr.	Chromosome 6 (human)
Band	6p22.1	Start	28,503,296 bp
Band	6p22.1	End	28,528,215 bp

Gene location (Mouse)
Chr.	Chromosome 13 (mouse)
Band	13|13 A3.1	Start	21,496,295 bp
Band	13|13 A3.1	End	21,503,794 bp
RNA expression pattern
Bgee	Human / Mouse (ortholog); Top expressed in: testicle; gonad; olfactory zone of nasal mucosa; right testis; left testis; islet of Langerhans; lung; colon; wall of intestine; muscle layer of sigmoid colon / Top expressed in: olfactory epithelium; spermatid; right kidney; zygote; outer renal medulla; seminiferous tubule; secondary oocyte; human kidney; primary oocyte; urethra; More reference expression data
BioGPS	n/a
Gene ontology
Molecular function	oxidoreductase activity; glutathione peroxidase activity; peroxidase activity
Cellular component	extracellular region
Biological process	cellular oxidant detoxification; response to oxidative stress
Sources:Amigo / QuickGO
Orthologs
Databases	NCBI: entry; OMA: entry
Species	Human	Mouse
Entrez	257202	75512
Ensembl	ENSG00000281185; ENSG00000198704	ENSMUSG00000004341
UniProt	P59796	Q91WR8
RefSeq (mRNA)	NM_182701	NM_145451
RefSeq (protein)	NP_874360	NP_663426
Location (UCSC)	Chr 6: 28.5 – 28.53 Mb	Chr 13: 21.5 – 21.5 Mb
PubMed search
- Wikidata
View/Edit Human	View/Edit Mouse

Glutathione peroxidase 6 (GPx-6) is an enzyme that in humans is encoded by the GPX6 gene.

This gene product belongs to the glutathione peroxidase family, which functions in the detoxification of hydrogen peroxide. It contains a selenocysteine (Sec) residue at its active site. The selenocysteine is encoded by the UGA codon, which normally signals translation termination. The 3' UTR of Sec-containing genes have a common stem-loop structure, the sec insertion sequence (SECIS), which is necessary for the recognition of UGA as a Sec codon rather than as a stop signal. Expression of this gene is restricted to embryos and adult olfactory epithelium.
