= PeroxiBase =

PeroxiBase logo

The PeroxiBase database has been created at the University of Geneva (Switzerland) at the end of 2003, by two plant biologists specialised in the study of plant peroxidases. It was first limited to class III peroxidases (plant peroxidases) and was then expanded to include all possible haem and non-haem peroxidase protein sequences. Many researchers and bioinformaticians from the University of Geneva joined their efforts to develop the database and rapidly increase the number of peroxidase sequences. Since 2005, the database accepts external contributions, which are verified by PeroxiBase curators. The majority of haem and non-haem peroxidase sequences can now be found in the PeroxiBase.

The database is hosted by the Swiss Institute of Bioinformatics.

Peroxidase sequences come from other general public databases (NCBI, TIGR, UniProt KnowledgeBase: all the databases used are listed in the PeroxiBase), either as pre-existing annotated sequences, or from raw data (whole genomic sequencing projects).

== Goals of the PeroxiBase ==
- To publicly (non-profit) provide the scientific community with a centralised platform regrouping information on peroxidase sequences. Possible applications: faster sequence search, phylogenetic analysis, expression profile determination
- To manually re-annotate existing sequences (automated annotation sometimes leads to wrong predictions)
- To acquire new sequences that are not yet available in other databases: non-annotated genomes, external contributions from sequencing groups
