= Glutathione peroxidase 5 =

Enzyme

GPX5
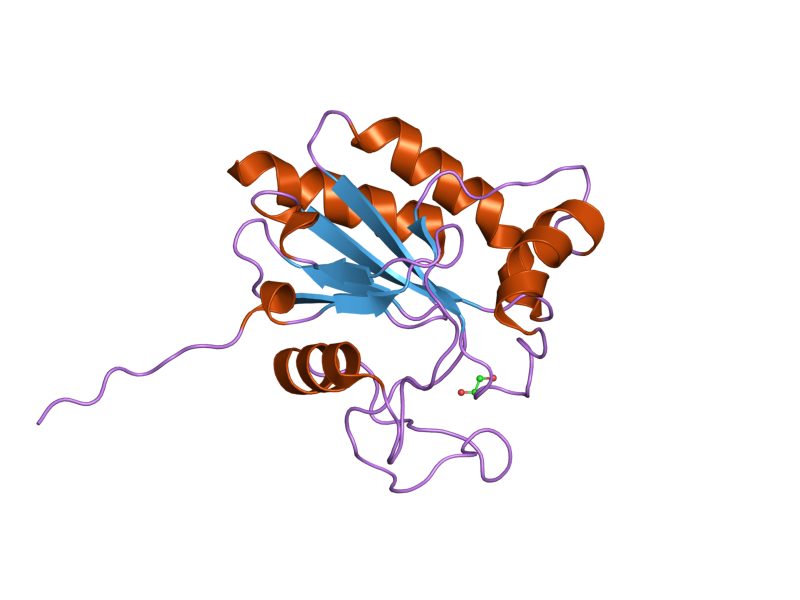

Identifiers
- Aliases: GPX5, HEL-S-75p, glutathione peroxidase 5, GPx-5, EGLP, GSHPx-5
- External IDs: OMIM: 603435; MGI: 104886; GeneCards: GPX5
Available structures
PDB	Ortholog search: PDBe RCSB
PDB	List of PDB id codes 2I3Y
Enzyme activity
EC #	BRENDA	ExPASy	KEGG	MetaCyc
1.11.1.9	↗	↗	↗	↗

Gene location (Human)
Chr.	Chromosome 6 (human)
Band	6p22.1	Start	28,525,881 bp
Band	6p22.1	End	28,534,955 bp

Gene location (Mouse)
Chr.	Chromosome 13 (mouse)
Band	13 A3.1|13 7.73 cM	Start	21,470,599 bp
Band	13 A3.1|13 7.73 cM	End	21,476,901 bp
RNA expression pattern
Bgee	Human / Mouse (ortholog); Top expressed in: right testis; left testis; superior frontal gyrus; prefrontal cortex; islet of Langerhans; prostate; canal of the cervix; blood; human musculoskeletal system; skeletal muscle / Top expressed in: morula; Ileal epithelium; blastocyst; perirhinal cortex; entorhinal cortex; dorsal striatum; CA3 field; white adipose tissue; epidermis; adrenal gland; More reference expression data
BioGPS	n/a
Gene ontology
Molecular function	oxidoreductase activity; peroxidase activity; glutathione peroxidase activity
Cellular component	sperm plasma membrane; extracellular region; extracellular space
Biological process	cellular oxidant detoxification; response to oxidative stress; lipid metabolism; cellular response to oxidative stress
Sources:Amigo / QuickGO
Orthologs
Databases	NCBI: entry; OMA: entry
Species	Human	Mouse
Entrez	2880	14780
Ensembl	ENSG00000257770; ENSG00000224586	ENSMUSG00000004344
UniProt	O75715	P21765
RefSeq (mRNA)	NM_001509; NM_003996	NM_010343
RefSeq (protein)	NP_001500; NP_003987	NP_034473
Location (UCSC)	Chr 6: 28.53 – 28.53 Mb	Chr 13: 21.47 – 21.48 Mb
PubMed search
- Wikidata
View/Edit Human	View/Edit Mouse

Glutathione peroxidase 5 (GPx-5), also known as epididymal secretory glutathione peroxidase, is an enzyme that in humans is encoded by the GPX5 gene.

GPx-5 belongs to the glutathione peroxidase family. It is specifically expressed in the epididymis in the mammalian male reproductive tract, and is androgen-regulated. Unlike mRNAs for other characterized glutathione peroxidases, this mRNA does not contain a selenocysteine (UGA) codon. Thus, the encoded protein is selenium-independent, and has been proposed to play a role in protecting the membranes of spermatozoa from the damaging effects of lipid peroxidation and/or preventing premature acrosome reaction. Alternatively spliced transcript variants encoding different isoforms have been described for this gene.
