= Glutathione peroxidase 3 =

Enzyme in humans

GPX3
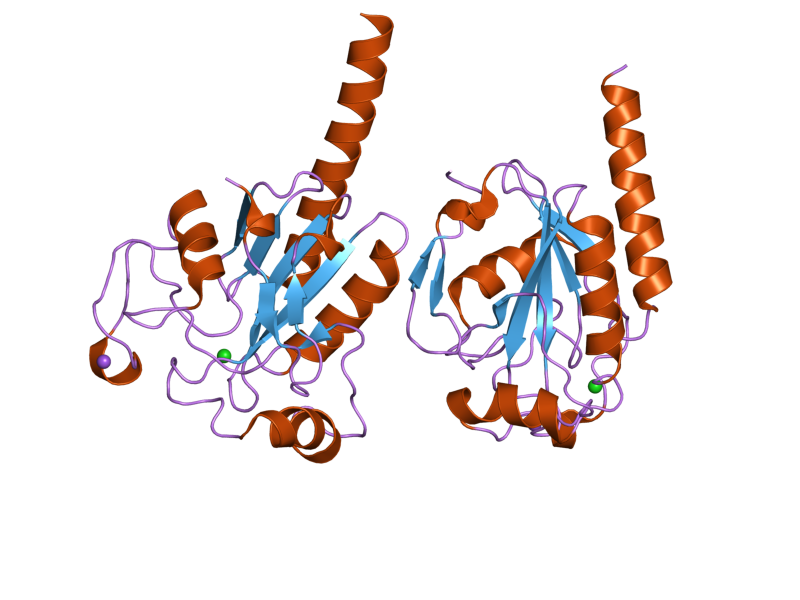

Identifiers
- Aliases: GPX3, GPx-P, GSHPx-3, GSHPx-P, glutathione peroxidase 3
- External IDs: OMIM: 138321; MGI: 105102; GeneCards: GPX3
Available structures
PDB	Ortholog search: PDBe RCSB
PDB	List of PDB id codes 2R37
Enzyme activity
EC #	BRENDA	ExPASy	KEGG	MetaCyc
1.11.1.9	↗	↗	↗	↗

Gene location (Human)
Chr.	Chromosome 5 (human)
Band	5q33.1	Start	151,020,591 bp
Band	5q33.1	End	151,028,988 bp

Gene location (Mouse)
Chr.	Chromosome 11 (mouse)
Band	11|11 B1.3	Start	54,793,279 bp
Band	11|11 B1.3	End	54,801,203 bp
RNA expression pattern
Bgee	Human / Mouse (ortholog); Top expressed in: right lobe of thyroid gland; right lung; left lobe of thyroid gland; gastric mucosa; lower lobe of lung; pericardium; upper lobe of left lung; human kidney; cardiac muscle tissue of right atrium; right auricle of heart / Top expressed in: right kidney; gastrula; human kidney; decidua; vestibular membrane of cochlear duct; lactiferous gland; stroma of bone marrow; atrium; ankle; right lung; More reference expression data
BioGPS	n/a
Gene ontology
Molecular function	oxidoreductase activity; glutathione peroxidase activity; selenium binding; transcription factor binding; protein binding; peroxidase activity
Cellular component	extracellular region; extracellular exosome; extracellular space
Biological process	protein homotetramerization; response to oxidative stress; response to lipid hydroperoxide; hydrogen peroxide catabolic process; cellular oxidant detoxification; cellular response to oxidative stress
Sources:Amigo / QuickGO
Orthologs
Databases	NCBI: entry; OMA: entry
Species	Human	Mouse
Entrez	2878	14778
Ensembl	ENSG00000211445	ENSMUSG00000018339
UniProt	P22352	P46412
RefSeq (mRNA)	NM_002084; NM_001329790	NM_001083929; NM_008161; NM_001329860
RefSeq (protein)	NP_001316719; NP_002075	NP_001316789; NP_032187
Location (UCSC)	Chr 5: 151.02 – 151.03 Mb	Chr 11: 54.79 – 54.8 Mb
PubMed search
- Wikidata
View/Edit Human	View/Edit Mouse

Glutathione peroxidase 3 (GPx-3), also known as plasma glutathione peroxidase (GPx-P) or extracellular glutathione peroxidase is an enzyme that in humans is encoded by the GPX3 gene.

GPx-3 belongs to the glutathione peroxidase family, which functions in the detoxification of hydrogen peroxide. It contains a selenocysteine (Sec) residue at its active site. The selenocysteine is encoded by the UGA codon, which normally signals translation termination. The 3' UTR of Sec-containing genes have a common stem-loop structure, the sec insertion sequence (SECIS), which is necessary for the recognition of UGA as a Sec codon rather than as a stop signal.

== Thiol specificity ==
GPx-3 has a wide thiol specificity. The sources of reducing power for GPx-3 in vitro include GSH, cysteine, mercaptoethanol, and dithiothreitol. There is an evidence of effectiveness of homocysteine in reduction of GPx-3: GSH can be completely replaced by reduced homocysteine in vitro.

== Changes during ontogeny ==
In the rat blood plasma, the GPx-3 activity is low during the first two weeks after birth and rapidly increasing during transition from milk nutrition to solid food. Aging is accompanied by decrease in GPx-3 activity: in the blood plasma of rats it occurs around 23-26 months of age.
