= Lignin peroxidase =

diarylpropane peroxidase

Identifiers
- EC no.: 1.11.1.14
- CAS no.: 93792-13-3

Databases
- IntEnz: IntEnz view
- BRENDA: BRENDA entry
- ExPASy: NiceZyme view
- KEGG: KEGG entry
- MetaCyc: metabolic pathway
- PRIAM: profile
- PDB structures: RCSB PDB PDBe PDBsum
- Gene Ontology: AmiGO / QuickGO
Search
- PMC: articles
- PubMed: articles
- NCBI: proteins

In enzymology, a lignin peroxidase (EC 1.11.1.14) is an enzyme that catalyzes the chemical reaction

1,2-bis(3,4-dimethoxyphenyl)propane-1,3-diol + H_{2}O_{2} $\rightleftharpoons$ 3,4-dimethoxybenzaldehyde + 1-(3,4-dimethoxyphenyl)ethane-1,2-diol + H_{2}O

Thus, the two substrates of this enzyme are 1,2-bis(3,4-dimethoxyphenyl)propane-1,3-diol and H_{2}O_{2}, whereas its 3 products are 3,4-dimethoxybenzaldehyde, 1-(3,4-dimethoxyphenyl)ethane-1,2-diol, and H_{2}O.

This enzyme belongs to the family of oxidoreductases, specifically those acting on a peroxide as acceptor (peroxidases) and can be included in the broad category of ligninases. The systematic name of this enzyme class is 1,2-bis(3,4-dimethoxyphenyl)propane-1,3-diol:hydrogen-peroxide oxidoreductase. Other names in common use include diarylpropane oxygenase, ligninase I, diarylpropane peroxidase, LiP, diarylpropane:oxygen,hydrogen-peroxide oxidoreductase (C-C-bond-cleaving). It employs one cofactor, heme.

== Background ==
Lignin is highly resistant to biodegradation and only higher fungi and some bacteria are capable of degrading the polymer via an oxidative process. This process has been studied extensively in the past twenty years, but the mechanism has not yet been fully elucidated.

Lignin is found to be degraded by enzyme lignin peroxidases produced by some fungi like Phanerochaete chrysosporium. The mechanism by which lignin peroxidase (LiP) interacts with the lignin polymer involves veratrole alcohol, which is a secondary metabolite of white rot fungi that acts as a cofactor for the enzyme.

== Structural studies ==
As of late 2007, 3 structures have been solved for this class of enzymes, with PDB accession codes 1B80, 1B82, and 1B85.
