= Glutathione peroxidase 8 =

Protein-coding gene in the species Homo sapiens

GPX8

Identifiers
- Aliases: GPX8, EPLA847, GPx-8, GSHPx-8, UNQ847, glutathione peroxidase 8 (putative)
- External IDs: OMIM: 617172; MGI: 1916840; GeneCards: GPX8
Available structures
PDB	Ortholog search: PDBe RCSB
PDB	List of PDB id codes 3CYN, 3KIJ
Enzyme activity
EC #	BRENDA	ExPASy	KEGG	MetaCyc
5.3.4.1	↗	↗	↗	↗

Gene location (Human)
Chr.	Chromosome 5 (human)
Band	5q11.2	Start	55,160,167 bp
Band	5q11.2	End	55,167,297 bp

Gene location (Mouse)
Chr.	Chromosome 13 (mouse)
Band	13|13 D2.2	Start	113,179,287 bp
Band	13|13 D2.2	End	113,182,944 bp
RNA expression pattern
Bgee	Human / Mouse (ortholog); Top expressed in: stromal cell of endometrium; tibia; germinal epithelium; placenta; smooth muscle tissue; Achilles tendon; parietal pleura; gonad; synovial membrane; corpus epididymis / Top expressed in: calvaria; umbilical cord; efferent ductule; Epithelium of choroid plexus; vestibular sensory epithelium; decidua; interventricular septum; uterus; intercostal muscle; cervix; More reference expression data
BioGPS	n/a
Gene ontology
Molecular function	oxidoreductase activity; glutathione peroxidase activity; peroxidase activity
Cellular component	integral component of membrane; endoplasmic reticulum lumen; membrane
Biological process	response to oxidative stress; cellular oxidant detoxification; cellular response to oxidative stress
Sources:Amigo / QuickGO
Orthologs
Databases	NCBI: entry; OMA: entry
Species	Human	Mouse
Entrez	493869	69590
Ensembl	ENSG00000164294	ENSMUSG00000021760
UniProt	Q8TED1	Q9D7B7
RefSeq (mRNA)	NM_001008397; NM_001306197; NM_001306198; NM_001306201	NM_027127
RefSeq (protein)	NP_001008398; NP_001293126; NP_001293127; NP_001293130	NP_081403
Location (UCSC)	Chr 5: 55.16 – 55.17 Mb	Chr 13: 113.18 – 113.18 Mb
PubMed search
- Wikidata
View/Edit Human	View/Edit Mouse

Glutathione peroxidase 8 (GPx-8) is an enzyme that in humans is encoded by the GPX8 gene. GPx-8 is a member of the glutathione peroxidase family.
