= Di-haem cytochrome c peroxidase =

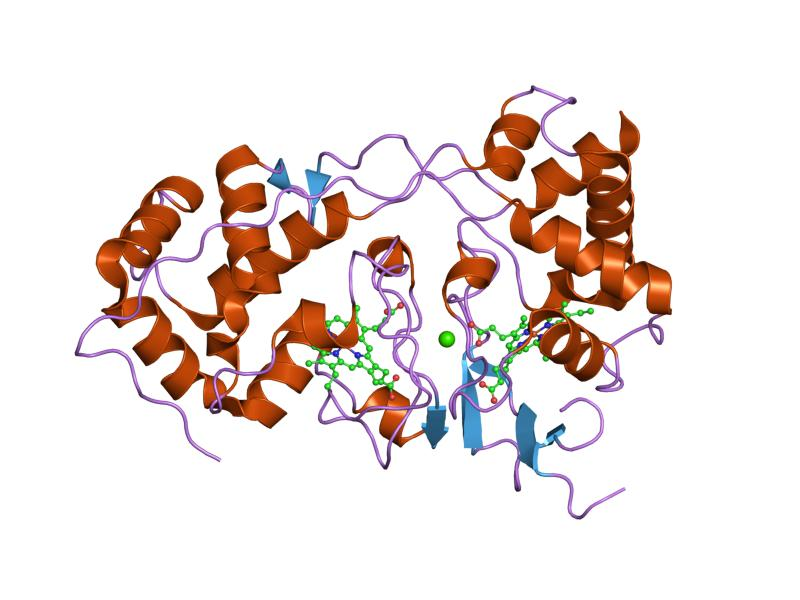
- crystal structure of the di-haem cytochrome c peroxidase from pseudomonas aeruginosa

Identifiers
- Symbol: CCP_MauG
- Pfam: PF03150
- Pfam clan: CL0318
- InterPro: IPR004852
- SCOP2: 1eb7 / SCOPe / SUPFAM
Available protein structures:
- PDB: IPR004852 PF03150 (ECOD; PDBsum)
- AlphaFold: IPR004852; PF03150

In molecular biology, the di-haem cytochrome c peroxidase family is a group of distinct cytochrome c peroxidases (CCPs) that contain two haem groups. Similar to other cytochrome c peroxidases, they reduce hydrogen peroxide to water using c-type haem as an oxidizable substrate. However, since they possess two, instead of one, haem prosthetic groups, this family of bacterial CCPs reduce hydrogen peroxide without the need to generate semi-stable free radicals. The two haem groups have significantly different redox potentials. The high potential (+320 mV) haem feeds electrons from electron shuttle proteins to the low potential (-330 mV) haem, where peroxide is reduced (indeed, the low potential site is known as the peroxidatic site). The CCP protein itself is structured into two domains, each containing one c-type haem group, with a calcium-binding site at the domain interface. This family also includes MauG proteins, whose similarity to di-haem CCP was previously recognised.
