= Manganese peroxidase =

manganese peroxidase

Identifiers
- EC no.: 1.11.1.13
- CAS no.: 114995-15-2

Databases
- IntEnz: IntEnz view
- BRENDA: BRENDA entry
- ExPASy: NiceZyme view
- KEGG: KEGG entry
- MetaCyc: metabolic pathway
- PRIAM: profile
- PDB structures: RCSB PDB PDBe PDBsum
- Gene Ontology: AmiGO / QuickGO
Search
- PMC: articles
- PubMed: articles
- NCBI: proteins

In enzymology, a manganese peroxidase (EC 1.11.1.13) is an enzyme that catalyzes the chemical reaction

2 Mn(II) + 2 H^{+} + H_{2}O_{2} $\rightleftharpoons$ 2 Mn(III) + 2 H_{2}O

The 3 substrates of this enzyme are Mn(II), H^{+}, and H_{2}O_{2}, whereas its two products are Mn(III) and H_{2}O.

This enzyme belongs to the family of oxidoreductases, to be specific those acting on a peroxide as acceptor (peroxidases). The systematic name of this enzyme class is Mn(II):hydrogen-peroxide oxidoreductase. Other names in common use include peroxidase-M2, and Mn-dependent (NADH-oxidizing) peroxidase. It employs one cofactor, heme. This enzyme needs Ca^{2+} for activity.

White rot fungi secrete this enzyme to aid lignin degradation.

== Discovery and characterization ==
Manganese peroxidase (commonly referred to as MnP) was discovered in 1985 simultaneously by the research groups of Michael H. Gold and Ronald Crawford in the fungus Phanerochaete chrysosporium. The protein was genetically sequenced in P. chrysoporium in 1989. The enzyme is thought to be unique to Basidiomycota as no bacterium, yeast, or mold species has yet been found which naturally produces it.

== Reaction mechanism ==
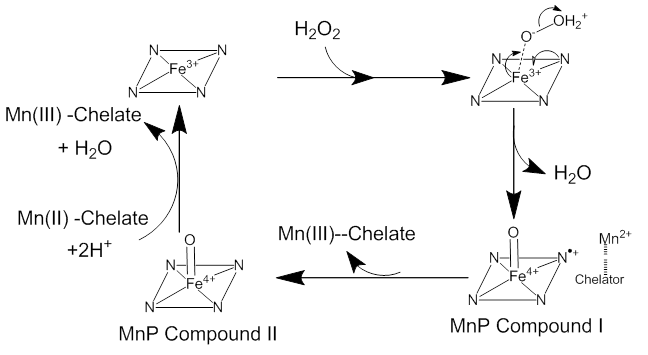
Sketch of manganese peroxidase mechanism showing the initial state, iron peroxide complex, and Compounds I and II. Here, the heme cofactor is represented via an iron-nitrogen complex. The Fe(IV) oxo-porphyrin radical resonates throughout the heme.

MnP catalysis occurs in a series of irreversible oxidation-reduction (redox) reactions which follow a ping-pong mechanism with second order kinetics. In the first step of the catalytic cycle, H_{2}O_{2}, or an organic peroxide, enters the active site of MnP. There the oxygen in H_{2}O_{2} binds to an Fe(III) ion in the heme cofactor to form an iron peroxide complex. Two electrons are transferred from Fe^{3+} to peroxide, breaking the oxygen-peroxide bond to form H_{2}O and a Fe(IV) oxo-porphyrin radical complex. This oxidized intermediate is known as MnP Compound I. MnP Compound I then binds to a monochelated Mn(II) ion, which donates an electron to quench the radical and form Mn(III) and MnP Compound II, a Fe(IV) oxo-porphyrin complex. MnP Compound II oxidizes another Mn(II) ion to Mn(III) and is reduced by the reaction of two H+ ions and the iron bound oxygen. This reforms the Fe(III) ion in the heme and releases a second water molecule. There are many deviations from this traditional catalytic cycle. MnP Compound I can be used to oxidize free Mn(II), ferrocyanide, as well as phenolics, and other aromatic compounds.

== Chelators ==
Mn(III) is unstable in aqueous media, therefore MnP releases it as a Mn(III)-carboxylic acid chelate. There are a variety of carboxylic acid chelators including oxalate, malonate, tartrate, and lactate, however oxalate is the most common. The peroxidase structure favors Mn(III)-chelates over free Mn(III) ions. The Mn(III) chelate interacts with the active site to facilitate product release from the enzyme. The chelator can have an effect on the kinetic rate and even the catalyzed reaction. If the substrate Mn(II) is chelated with lactate, MnP instead catalyzes the evolution of O_{2}. However, this side reaction has little impact on enzymatic activity because it follows slower third order kinetics.

== Structural studies ==
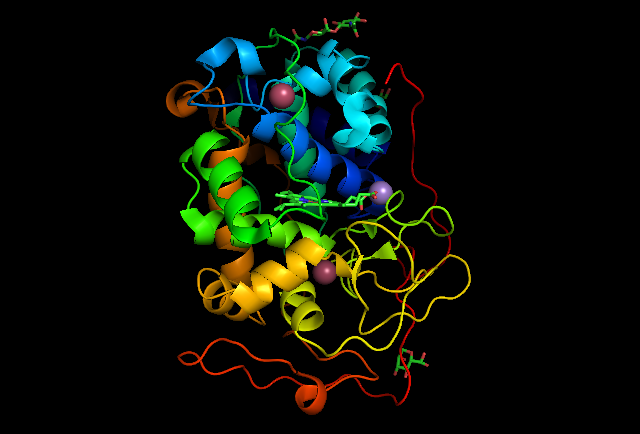
Structure of manganese peroxidase. Bounded manganese and calcium ions are highlighted in purple and pink, respectively.

As of late 2007, 6 structures have been solved for this class of enzymes, with PDB accession codes 1MN1, 1MN2, 1YYD, 1YYG, 1YZP, and 1YZR.

Although MnP, like other lignin peroxidases, is a Class II peroxidase, it has a similar tertiary structure to prokaryotic Class I peroxidases, but contains disulfide bridges like the Class III peroxidases in plants. MnP has a globular structure containing 11-12 α-helices, depending on the species it is produced in. It is stabilized by 10 cystine amino acid residues which form 5 disulfide bridges, one of which is near the C-terminal area. The active site contains a heme cofactor which is bound by two Ca^{2+} ions, one above and one below the heme. Near the internal heme propionate are three acidic residues which are used to stabilize Mn(II) or Mn(III) when it is bound to the enzyme. The specific residues vary between species, but their number and relative location in the folded protein is conserved. There are a total of 357 amino acid residues in the MnP of P. chrysosoporium, and a similar number in enzymes produced by other basidiomycetes.

== Biochemical significance ==
The major function of the Mn(III) ions produced by MnP is oxidation and degradation of lignin. For this purpose, basidiomycetes secrete MnP, rather than Mn(III), and the enzyme functions outside of the fungal cell. Mn(III) ions from MnP can oxidize the phenolic compounds in lignin directly, but they can also oxidize some organic sulfur compounds and unsaturated fatty acids. This oxidation forms thiyl and peroxyl radicals, which in the presence of O_{2}, can oxidize lignin or react with water to form H_{2}O_{2}. The Mn^{3+} ion itself can degrade lignin by catalyzing alkyl-aryl cleavages and α-carbon oxidation in phenols.

== Regulation ==
MnP activity is controlled via transcriptional regulation. MnP is up-regulated by increases in extracellular Mn(II) and H_{2}O_{2} concentrations. It has been found that increased O_{2} concentration and heat stress also activate MnP.
