= Glutathione peroxidase 1 =

Protein-coding gene in the species Homo sapiens

GPX1
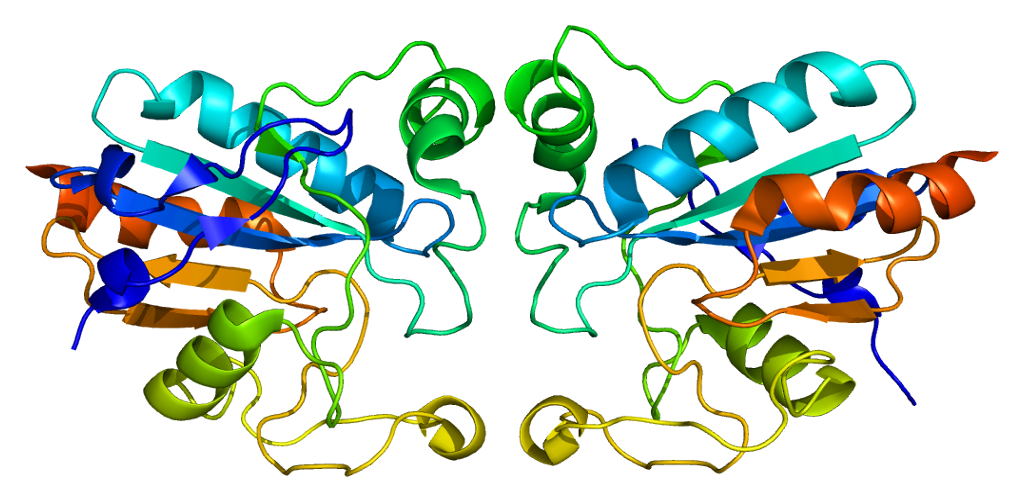

Identifiers
- Aliases: GPX1, GPXD, GSHPX1, glutathione peroxidase 1
- External IDs: OMIM: 138320; MGI: 104887; GeneCards: GPX1
Available structures
PDB	Ortholog search: PDBe RCSB
PDB	List of PDB id codes 2F8A
Enzyme activity
EC #	BRENDA	ExPASy	KEGG	MetaCyc
1.11.1.9	↗	↗	↗	↗
1.11.1.12	↗	↗	↗	↗

Gene location (Human)
Chr.	Chromosome 3 (human)
Band	3p21.31	Start	49,357,176 bp
Band	3p21.31	End	49,358,353 bp

Gene location (Mouse)
Chr.	Chromosome 9 (mouse)
Band	9 F2|9 59.24 cM	Start	108,216,102 bp
Band	9 F2|9 59.24 cM	End	108,217,542 bp
RNA expression pattern
Bgee	Human / Mouse (ortholog); Top expressed in: monocyte; blood; granulocyte; right adrenal gland; right adrenal cortex; left adrenal cortex; gonad; right lung; spleen; subcutaneous adipose tissue / Top expressed in: fetal liver hematopoietic progenitor cell; right kidney; left lobe of liver; blood; tibiofemoral joint; human fetus; cervix; granulocyte; submandibular gland; bone marrow; More reference expression data
BioGPS	n/a
Gene ontology
Molecular function	peroxidase activity; SH3 domain binding; glutathione peroxidase activity; oxidoreductase activity
Cellular component	cytoplasm; Lewy body; mitochondrial matrix; mitochondrion; cytosol
Biological process	regulation of proteasomal protein catabolic process; intrinsic apoptotic signaling pathway in response to oxidative stress; myotube differentiation; response to selenium ion; positive regulation of protein kinase B signaling; negative regulation of cysteine-type endopeptidase activity involved in apoptotic process; response to drug; endothelial cell development; glutathione metabolic process; regulation of gene expression, epigenetic; blood vessel endothelial cell migration; lipid metabolism; negative regulation of release of cytochrome c from mitochondria; angiogenesis involved in wound healing; regulation of neuron apoptotic process; vasodilation; purine nucleotide catabolic process; negative regulation of apoptotic process; response to symbiotic bacterium; response to hydroperoxide; regulation of mammary gland epithelial cell proliferation; hearing; response to oxidative stress; cell redox homeostasis; lipoxygenase pathway; positive regulation of supramolecular fiber organization; myoblast proliferation; skeletal muscle tissue regeneration; negative regulation of inflammatory response to antigenic stimulus; response to wounding; skeletal muscle fiber development; negative regulation of extrinsic apoptotic signaling pathway via death domain receptors; biological process involved in interaction with symbiont; UV protection; negative regulation of oxidative stress-induced intrinsic apoptotic signaling pathway; temperature homeostasis; cell population proliferation; response to gamma radiation; triglyceride metabolic process; response to toxic substance; fat cell differentiation; apoptotic process; cellular oxidant detoxification; response to hydrogen peroxide; hydrogen peroxide catabolic process; heart contraction; response to reactive oxygen species; cellular response to oxidative stress
Sources:Amigo / QuickGO
Orthologs
Databases	NCBI: entry; OMA: entry
Species	Human	Mouse
Entrez	2876	14775
Ensembl	ENSG00000233276	ENSMUSG00000063856
UniProt	P07203	P11352
RefSeq (mRNA)	NM_000581; NM_001329455; NM_001329502; NM_001329503; NM_201397	NM_008160; NM_001329527; NM_001329528
RefSeq (protein)	NP_000572; NP_001316384; NP_001316431; NP_001316432; NP_958799	NP_001316456; NP_001316457; NP_032186
Location (UCSC)	Chr 3: 49.36 – 49.36 Mb	Chr 9: 108.22 – 108.22 Mb
PubMed search
- Wikidata
View/Edit Human	View/Edit Mouse

Glutathione peroxidase 1, also known as GPx1, is an enzyme that in humans is encoded by the GPX1 gene on chromosome 3. This gene encodes a member of the glutathione peroxidase family. Glutathione peroxidase functions in the detoxification of hydrogen peroxide, and is one of the most important antioxidant enzymes in humans.

== Structure ==
This gene encodes a member of the glutathione peroxidase family, consisting of eight known glutathione peroxidases (GPx1-8) in humans. Mammalian Gpx1 (this gene), Gpx2, Gpx3, and Gpx4 have been shown to be selenium-containing enzymes, whereas Gpx6 is a selenoprotein in humans with cysteine-containing homologues in rodents. In selenoproteins, the 21st amino acid selenocysteine is inserted in the nascent polypeptide chain during the process of translational recoding of the UGA stop codon. In addition to the UGA-codon, a cis-acting element in the mRNA, called SECIS, binds SBP2 to recruit other proteins, such as eukaryotic elongation factor selenocysteine-tRNA specific, to form the complex responsible for the recoding process.

The protein encoded by this gene forms a homotetramer structure. As with other glutathione peroxidases, GPx1 has a conserved catalytic tetrad composed of Sec or Cys, Gln, Trp, and Asn, where the Sec is surrounded by four arginines (R 57, 103, 184, 185; bovine numbering) and a lysine of an adjacent subunit (K 91'). These 5 residues bind glutathione (GSH) and are only present in GPx1.

Two alternatively spliced transcript variants encoding distinct isoforms have been found for this gene.

Glutathione peroxidase 1 is characterized in a polyalanine sequence polymorphism in the N-terminal region, which includes three alleles with five, six or seven alanine (Ala) repeats in this sequence. The allele with five Ala repeats is significantly associated with breast cancer risk.

== Function ==
GPX1 is ubiquitously expressed in many tissues, where it protects cells from oxidative stress. Within cells, it localizes to the cytoplasm and mitochondria. As a glutathione peroxidase, GPx1 functions in the detoxification of hydrogen peroxide, specifically by catalyzing the reduction of hydrogen peroxide to water. The glutathione peroxidase also catalyzes the reduction of other organic hydroperoxides, such as lipid peroxides, to the corresponding alcohols. GPx1 typically uses glutathione (GSH) as the reductant, but when glutathione synthetase (GSS) is, as in brain mitochondria, γ-glutamylcysteine can serve as the reductant instead. The protein encoded by this gene protects from CD95-induced apoptosis in cultured breast cancer cells and inhibits 5-lipoxygenase in blood cells, and its overexpression delays endothelial cell death and increases resistance to toxic challenges, especially oxidative stress. This protein is one of only a few proteins known in higher vertebrates to contain selenocysteine, which occurs at the active site of glutathione peroxidase and is coded by the nonsense (stop) codon TGA.

== Animal studies ==
GPX1 helps to prevent cardiac dysfunction after ischemia-reperfusion injuries. Mitochondrial ROS production and oxidative mtDNA damage is increased during reoxygenation in the GPX1 knockout mice, in addition to structural abnormalities in cardiac mitochondria and myocytes, suggesting GPX1 may play an important role in protecting cardiac mitochondria from reoxygenation damage in vivo.

In GPX1 (-/-) mice, oxidant formation is increased, endothelial NO synthase is deregulated, and adhesion of leukocytes to cultured endothelial cells is increased. Experimental GPX1 deficiency amplifies certain aspects of aging, namely endothelial dysfunction, vascular remodeling, and invasion of leukocytes in cardiovascular tissue.

== Clinical significance ==
The GPx1 allele with five Ala repeats is significantly associated with breast cancer risk.

Kocabasoglu, et al., sought to investigate connections between oxidative stress genes, including GPX1, and Panic Disorder, an anxiety disorder characterized by random and unexpected attacks of intense fear. Although the GPX1 Pro198Leu polymorphism, in general, did not significantly correlate with panic disorder risk, the study found a plausible association of the C allele of the GPX1 Pro198Leu polymorphism, found to be more frequent in the female cohort, with PD development.

Ergen and colleagues analyzed gene expression of oxidative stress genes, specifically GPX1, in colorectal tumors in comparison to healthy colorectal tissues. ELISA was utilized to quantify GPX1 protein expression levels in both tissue types, highlighting a 2-fold decrease in tumor tissue (p<0.05).

In esophageal cancer, Chen and colleagues found that vitamin D, a known suppressor of GPX1 expression via the NF-κB signaling pathway, could help to decrease the proliferative, migratory, and invasive capabilities of esophageal cancer cells. Unlike in colorectal cancer, GPX1 expression in esophageal cancer cells is thought to drive aggressive growth and metastasis, but Vitamin D-mediated decrease in GPX1 prevents such growth.

In a study looking at gene polymorphisms of GPX1 and other oxidative stress genes in relation to prevalence of Type 2 diabetes mellitus, Banerjee, et al., found that while no association was found in expression of most GPX1 polymorphisms and risk of Type 2 diabetes mellitus, having the C allele of GPX1 led to a 1.362 times higher risk of the disease, highlighting the importance of finding individuals in the population with this gene variant to help treat them early on.

Recent work by Alan M. Diamond and colleagues has shown that allelic variations of GPX1, like the codon 198 polymorphism that results in leucine or proline and an increase in alanine repeat codons, can result in different localization levels in MCF-7 human breast carcinoma cells. For instance, the allele expressing the leucine-198 polymorphism and 7 alanine repeats generates GPX-1 localization that is disproportionately in the cytoplasm as compared to other allelic variants. To further understand the effects of these variants on GPX-1 function, mutant GPX-1 with mitochondrial localization sequences were generated and the GPX-1 infused cells were analyzed for their response to oxidative stress, energy metabolism and cancer-associated signaling molecules. Ultimately, GPX-1 variants heavily influenced cellular biology, suggesting that different GPX-1 variants affect cancer risk differently.

An analysis of GPX1 expression in oligodendrocytes from patients with major depressive disorder and control patients showed that GPX1 levels were significantly decreased in patients with the disorder, but not in their astrocytes. Shortening of telomeres and decreased expression of telomerase were also evident in these oligodendrocytes, but not in the astrocytes in these patients. This suggests that decreased oxidative stress protection, as observed by decreased GPX1 levels, and decreased telomerase expression may help give rise to telomere shortening in patients with MDD.

== Interactions ==
GPX1 has been shown to interact with ABL and GSH.

A recently discovered suppressor for GPX1 is S-adenosylhomocysteine, which when accumulated in endothelial cells can cause tRNA(Sec) hypomethylation, reducing the expression of GPX1 and other selenoproteins. The decreased GPX-1 expression can then lead to inflammatory activating of endothelial cells, helping give rise to a proatherogenic endothelial phenotype.
