= DyP-type peroxidase family =

Dyp-type peroxidase family
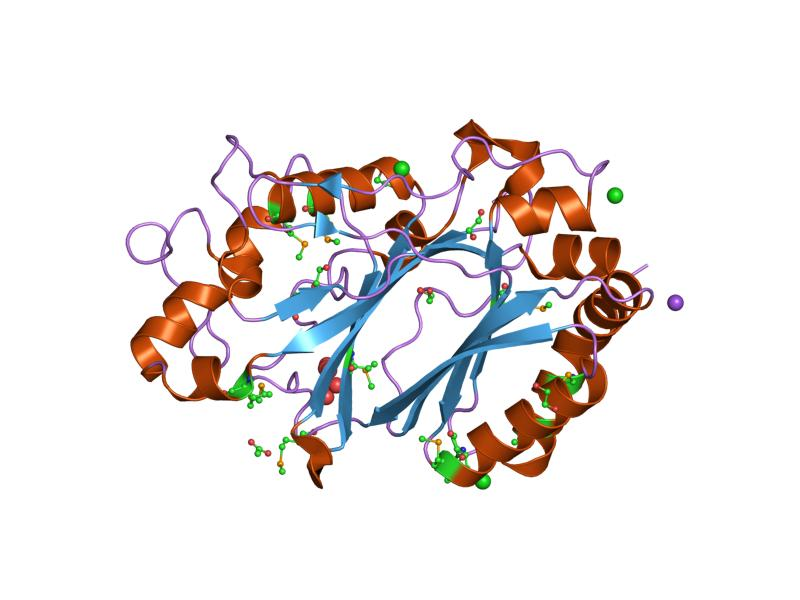
- crystal structure of a dye-decolorizing peroxidase (dyp) from bacteroides thetaiotaomicron vpi-5482 at 1.6 a resolution

Identifiers
- Symbol: Dyp_perox
- Pfam: PF04261
- Pfam clan: CL0032
- InterPro: IPR006314
Available protein structures:
- Pfam: structures / ECOD
- PDB: RCSB PDB; PDBe; PDBj
- PDBsum: structure summary

In molecular biology, the DyP-type peroxidase family is a family of haem peroxidase enzymes. Haem peroxidases were originally divided into two superfamilies, namely, the animal peroxidases and the plant peroxidases (which are subdivided into class I, II and III), which include fungal (class II) and bacterial peroxidases. The DyP (for dye de-colourising peroxidase) family constitutes a novel class of haem peroxidase. Because these enzymes were derived from fungal sources, the DyP family was thought to be structurally related to the class II secretory fungal peroxidases. However, the DyP family exhibits only low sequence similarity to classical fungal peroxidases, such as LiP and MnP, and does not contain the conserved proximal and distal histidines and an essential arginine found in other plant peroxidase superfamily members.

DyP proteins have several characteristics that distinguish them from all other peroxidases, including a particularly wide substrate specificity, a lack of homology to most other peroxidases, and the ability to function well under much lower pH conditions compared with the other plant peroxidases. In terms of substrate specificity, DyP degrades the typical peroxidase substrates, but also degrades hydroxyl-free anthraquinone (many dyes are derived from anthraquinone compounds).

Crystal structures of DyP family members reveal two domains, each one adopting a ferredoxin-like fold. The proteins consist of an N-terminal domain and a C-terminal domain likely to be related by a duplication of an ancestral gene, as inferred from the conserved topology of the domains. The haem iron is penta-coordinated, with the protein contributing a conserved histidine ligand to the iron centre. A conserved Asp most likely acts as a proton donor/acceptor and takes the place of the catalytic histidine used by plant peroxidases. This Asp substitution helps explain why the DyP family is active at low pH.
