= Glutathione dehydrogenase (ascorbate) =

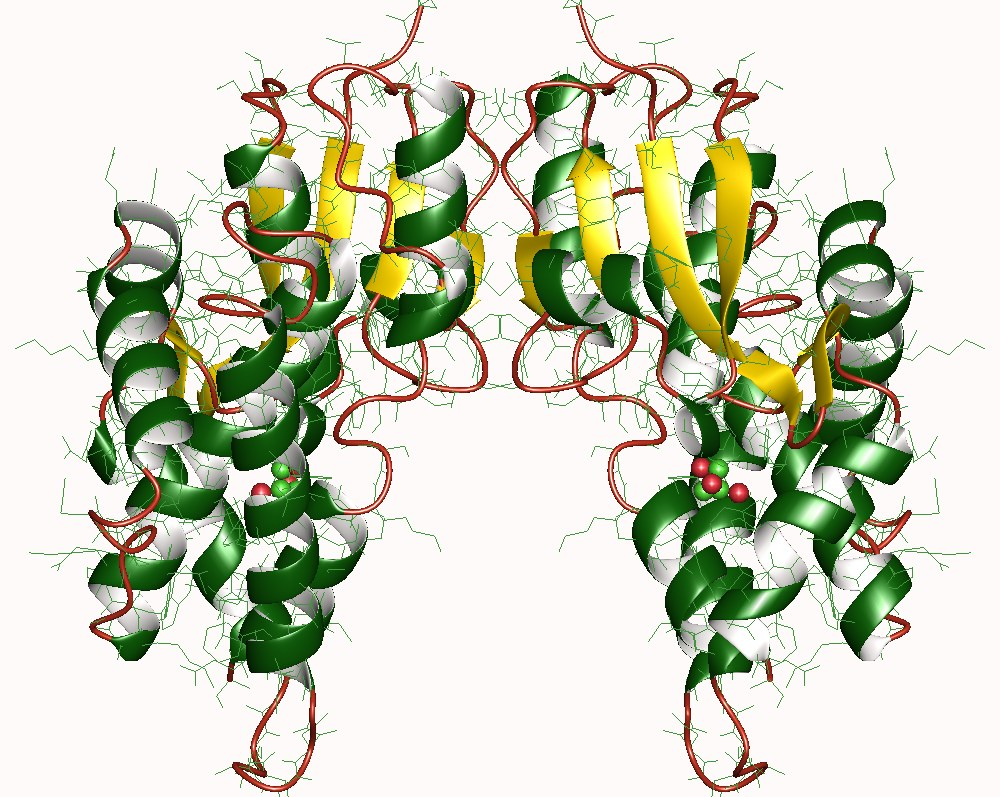
- Dehydroascorbate reductase, Pennisetum americanum

Identifiers
- EC no.: 1.8.5.1
- CAS no.: 9026-38-4

Databases
- IntEnz: IntEnz view
- BRENDA: BRENDA entry
- ExPASy: NiceZyme view
- KEGG: KEGG entry
- MetaCyc: metabolic pathway
- PRIAM: profile
- PDB structures: RCSB PDB PDBe PDBsum
- Gene Ontology: AmiGO / QuickGO
Search
- PMC: articles
- PubMed: articles
- NCBI: proteins

Glutathione dehydrogenase (ascorbate) (EC 1.8.5.1) is an enzyme that catalyzes the chemical reaction

dehydroascorbic acid
+ 2
glutathione
glutathione disulfide
+
ascorbic acid

The substrates of this enzyme are dehydroascorbic acid and glutathione. Its products are glutathione disulfide and ascorbic acid (vitamin C).

This enzyme belongs to the family of oxidoreductases, specifically those acting on a sulfur group of donors with a quinone or similar compound as acceptor. The systematic name of this enzyme class is glutathione:dehydroascorbate oxidoreductase. Other names in common use include dehydroascorbic reductase, dehydroascorbic acid reductase, glutathione dehydroascorbate reductase, DHA reductase, dehydroascorbate reductase, GDOR, and glutathione:dehydroascorbic acid oxidoreductase. This enzyme participates in three metabolic pathways: ascorbate and aldarate metabolism, glutamate metabolism, and glutathione metabolism.

== Structural studies ==
As of late 2007, two structures have been solved for this class of enzymes, with PDB accession codes 2HZE and 2HZF.
