= Cytochrome c peroxidase =

Cytochrome-c peroxidase
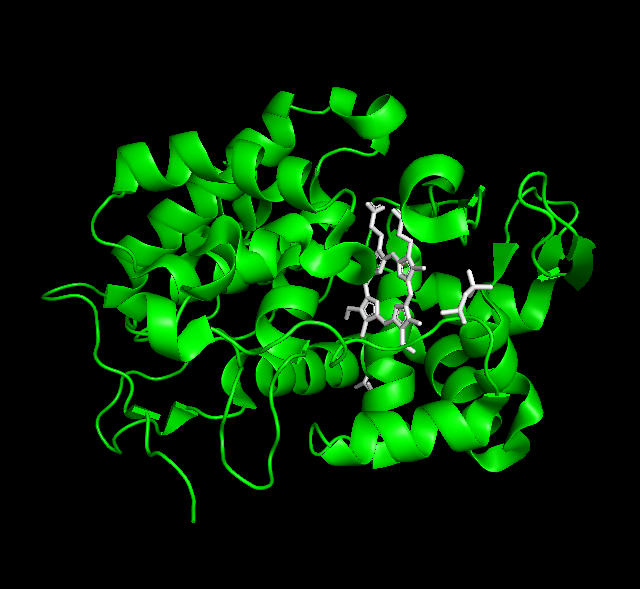

Identifiers
- EC no.: 1.11.1.5
- CAS no.: 9029-53-2

Databases
- IntEnz: IntEnz view
- BRENDA: BRENDA entry
- ExPASy: NiceZyme view
- KEGG: KEGG entry
- MetaCyc: metabolic pathway
- PRIAM: profile
- PDB structures: RCSB PDB PDBe PDBsum
- Gene Ontology: AmiGO / QuickGO
Search
- PMC: articles
- PubMed: articles
- NCBI: proteins

Cytochrome c peroxidase

Identifiers
- Organism: Saccharomyces cerevisiae
- Symbol: CCP
- UniProt: P00431
Search for
- Structures: Swiss-model
- Domains: InterPro

Cytochrome c peroxidase, CCP, or CcP, is a water-soluble heme-containing enzyme of the peroxidase family that takes reducing equivalents from cytochrome c and reduces hydrogen peroxide to water:

CCP + H_{2}O_{2} + 2 ferrocytochrome c + 2H^{+} → CCP + 2H_{2}O + 2 ferricytochrome c

CCP can be derived from aerobically grown yeast strains and can be isolated in both native and recombinant forms with high yield from Saccharomyces cerevisiae. The enzyme’s primary function is to eliminate toxic radical molecules produced by the cell which are harmful to biological systems. It works to maintain low concentration levels of hydrogen peroxide, which is generated by the organism naturally through incomplete oxygen reduction. When glucose levels in fast growing yeast strains are exhausted, the cells turn to respiration which raises the concentration of mitochondrial H_{2}O_{2.} In addition to its peroxidase activity, it acts as a sensor and a signaling molecule to exogenous H_{2}O_{2}, which activates mitochondrial catalase activity. In eukaryotes, CCP contain a mono-b-type haem cofactor and is targeted to the intermembrane space of the mitochondria. In prokaryotes, CCP contains a c-type diheme cofactor and is localized to the periplasm of the cell. Both enzymes work to resist peroxide-induced cellular stress.

CCP plays an integral role in enabling inter-protein biological electron transfer. The negative charge transfer process is carried out by a complex formed between cytochrome c and cytochrome c peroxidase which occurs in the inter-membrane space of mitochondria. The mechanism involves ferrous cytochrome c (Cc) providing electrons for the Cc-CcP system to reduce hydrogen peroxide to water. The complex is formed by non-covalent interactions.

Cytochrome c peroxidase can react with hydroperoxides other than hydrogen peroxide, but the reaction rate is much slower than with hydrogen peroxide.

It was first isolated from baker's yeast by R. A. Altschul, Abrams, and Hogness in 1940, though not to purity. The first purified preparation of yeast CCP dates to Takashi Yonetani and his preparation by ion exchange chromatography in the early 1960s. The X-ray structure was the work of Thomas Poulos and coworkers in the late 1970s. CCP is the first heme enzyme to have its structure successfully solved through X-ray crystallography.

The yeast enzyme is a monomer of molecular weight 34,000, containing 293 amino acids, and contains as well a single non-covalently bound heme b. It is negatively charged and is a moderately-sized enzyme (34.2 kDa). The apoenzyme, not active and bound to substrates, has an acidic isoelectric point of pH 5.0-5.2. Unusual for proteins, this enzyme crystallizes when dialysed against distilled water. More so, the enzyme purifies as a consequence of crystallization, making cycles of crystallization an effective final purification step.

Much like catalase, the reaction of cytochrome c peroxidase proceeds through a three-step process, forming first a Compound I and then a Compound II intermediate:

CCP + ROOH → Compound I + ROH + H_{2}O
CCP-compound I + e^{−} + H^{+} → Compound II
Compound II + e^{−} + H^{+} → CCP

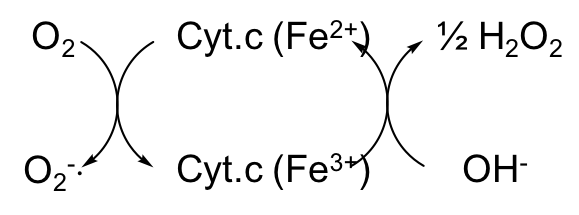
CCP-catalyzed redox cycle

CCP in the resting state has a ferric heme, and, after the addition of two oxidizing equivalents from a hydroperoxide (usually hydrogen peroxide), it becomes oxidized to a formal oxidation state of +5 (Fe^{V}, commonly referred to as ferryl heme. However, both low-temperature magnetic susceptibility measurements and Mössbauer spectroscopy show that the iron in Compound I of CCP is a +4 ferryl iron, with the second oxidizing equivalent existing as a long-lived free-radical on the side-chain of the tryptophan residue (Trp-191). In its resting state, the Fe atom (Fe (III)) in the CCP heme is paramagnetic with high spin (S= 5/2). Once the catalytic cycle is initiated, the iron atom is oxidized to form an oxyferryl intermediate (Fe(IV)=O), which has low spin (S= 1/2). This is different from most peroxidases, which have the second oxidizing equivalent on the porphyrin instead. Compound I of CCP is fairly long-lived, decaying to CCP-compound II with a half-life at room temperature of 40 minutes to a couple hours.

CCP has high sequence identity to the closely related ascorbate peroxidase enzyme.

== Amino acid composition ==
CCP shows an unusual amino acid pattern compared to other peroxidase. Plant peroxidase such as horseradish peroxidase and pineapple peroxidase B have low lysine, tryptophan, and tyrosine contents and high cysteine content. In contrast, CCP has high lysine, tryptophan, and tyrosine content and low cysteine content. The enzyme contains a 68-residue sequence at the N-terminus of its monomeric protein, which targets it to the inter-membrane space of the mitochondria where it can the complex with cytochrome c and where it carries out its sensor, signaling and catalytic roles. Studies indicate the distal arginine (Arg48), a highly conserved amino acid among peroxidase, plays an important role in the catalytic activity of CCP by controlling its active site through stabilization of the reactive oxyferryl intermediate from control of its access.
