= Glutathione peroxidase 2 =

Protein-coding gene in the species Homo sapiens

GPX2
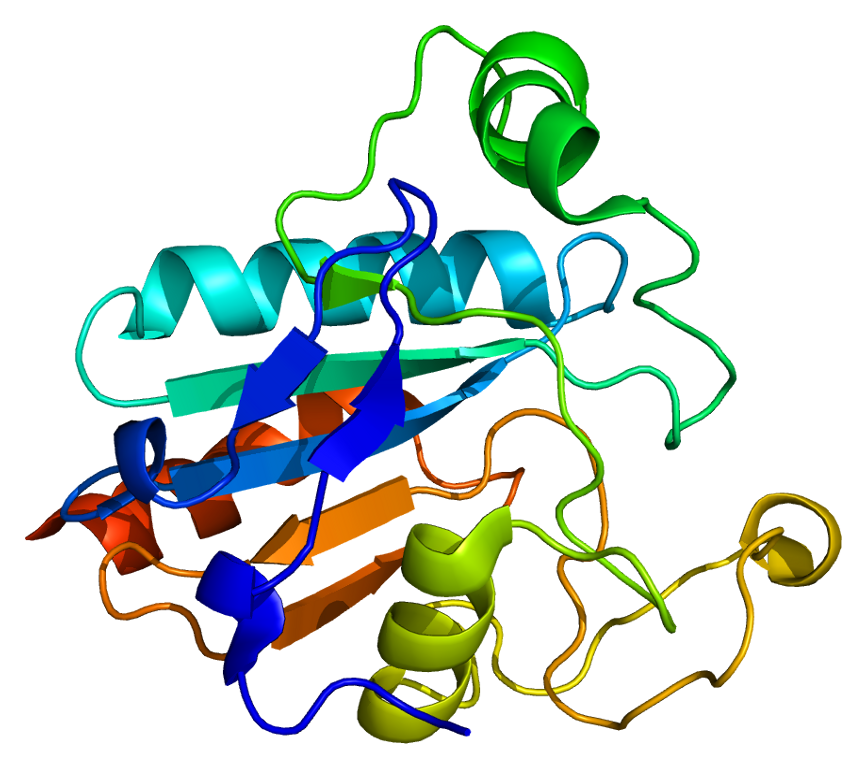

Identifiers
- Aliases: GPX2, GI-GPx, GPRP, GPRP-2, GPx-2, GPx-GI, GSHPX-GI, GSHPx-2, glutathione peroxidase 2
- External IDs: OMIM: 138319; MGI: 106609; GeneCards: GPX2
Available structures
PDB	Ortholog search: PDBe RCSB
PDB	List of PDB id codes 2HE3
Enzyme activity
EC #	BRENDA	ExPASy	KEGG	MetaCyc
1.11.1.9	↗	↗	↗	↗
1.11.1.12	↗	↗	↗	↗

Gene location (Human)
Chr.	Chromosome 14 (human)
Band	14q23.3	Start	64,939,152 bp
Band	14q23.3	End	64,942,746 bp

Gene location (Mouse)
Chr.	Chromosome 12 (mouse)
Band	12 C3|12 33.73 cM	Start	76,839,107 bp
Band	12 C3|12 33.73 cM	End	76,842,273 bp
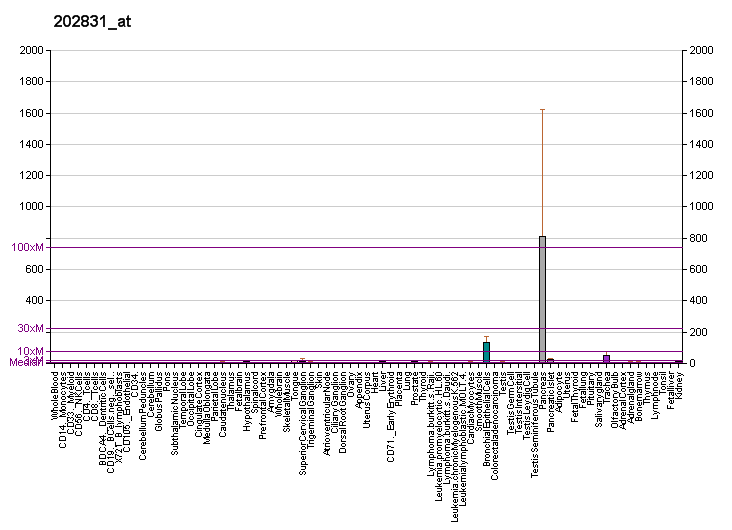
RNA expression pattern
Bgee	Human / Mouse (ortholog); Top expressed in: gallbladder; rectum; mucosa of sigmoid colon; mucosa of transverse colon; pancreatic ductal cell; islet of Langerhans; mucosa of ileum; nasal epithelium; right lobe of liver; olfactory zone of nasal mucosa / Top expressed in: crypt of lieberkuhn of small intestine; esophagus; large intestine; colon; duodenum; jejunum; left colon; mucous cell of stomach; epithelium of bronchus; epithelium of stomach; More reference expression data
BioGPS	More reference expression data
Gene ontology
Molecular function	electron transfer activity; oxidoreductase activity; glutathione peroxidase activity; peroxidase activity
Cellular component	cytoplasm; cytosol
Biological process	response to oxidative stress; cellular oxidant detoxification; cellular response to oxidative stress; electron transport chain
Sources:Amigo / QuickGO
Orthologs
Databases	NCBI: entry; OMA: entry
Species	Human	Mouse
Entrez	2877	14776
Ensembl	ENSG00000176153	ENSMUSG00000042808
UniProt	P18283	Q9JHC0
RefSeq (mRNA)	NM_002083	NM_030677
RefSeq (protein)	NP_002074	NP_109602
Location (UCSC)	Chr 14: 64.94 – 64.94 Mb	Chr 12: 76.84 – 76.84 Mb
PubMed search
- Wikidata
View/Edit Human	View/Edit Mouse

Glutathione peroxidase 2 is an enzyme that in humans is encoded by the GPX2 gene.

This gene is a member of the glutathione peroxidase family encoding a selenium-dependent glutathione peroxidase that is one of two isoenzymes responsible for the majority of the glutathione-dependent hydrogen peroxide-reducing activity in the epithelium of the gastrointestinal tract. Studies in knockout mice indicate that mRNA expression levels respond to luminal microflora, suggesting a role of the ileal glutathione peroxidases in preventing inflammation in the GI tract.

The antioxidant enzyme glutathione peroxidase 2 (Gpx2) is one out of eight known glutathione peroxidases (Gpx1-8) in humans. Mammalian Gpx1, GPx2 (this protein), Gpx3, and Gpx4 have been shown to be selenium-containing enzymes, whereas Gpx6 is a selenoprotein in humans with cysteine-containing homologues in rodents. In selenoproteins, the 21st amino acid selenocysteine is inserted in the nascent polypeptide chain during the process of translational recoding of the UGA stop codon.
