= Glutathione disulfide =

Names
- Systematic IUPAC name (2S,2′S)-5,5′-(Disulfanediylbis{(2R)-3-[(carboxymethyl)amino]-3-oxopropane-1,2-diyl})bis(2-amino-5-oxopentanoic acid)

Identifiers
CAS Number	27025-41-8
3D model (JSmol)	Interactive image
Abbreviations	GSSG
ChEMBL	ChEMBL1372
ChemSpider	58835
ECHA InfoCard	100.043.777
IUPHAR/BPS	6835
KEGG	C00127
PubChem CID	65359; 11215652
UNII	ULW86O013H
CompTox Dashboard (EPA)	DTXSID5048972
- InChI: InChI=1S/C20H32N6O12S2/c21-9(19(35)36)1-3-13(27)25-11(17(33)23-5-15(29)30)7-39-40-8-12(18(34)24-6-16(31)32)26-14(28)4-2-10(22)20(37)38/h9-12H,1-8,21-22H2,(H,23,33)(H,24,34)(H,25,27)(H,26,28)(H,29,30)(H,31,32)(H,35,36)(H,37,38)/t9-,10-,11-,12-/m0/s1 Key: YPZRWBKMTBYPTK-BJDJZHNGSA-N; InChI=1/C20H32N6O12S2/c21-9(19(35)36)1-3-13(27)25-11(17(33)23-5-15(29)30)7-39-40-8-12(18(34)24-6-16(31)32)26-14(28)4-2-10(22)20(37)38/h9-12H,1-8,21-22H2,(H,23,33)(H,24,34)(H,25,27)(H,26,28)(H,29,30)(H,31,32)(H,35,36)(H,37,38)/t9-,10-,11-,12-/m0/s1 Key: YPZRWBKMTBYPTK-BJDJZHNGBD
- SMILES: C(CC(=O)N[C@@H](CSSC[C@@H](C(=O)NCC(=O)O)NC(=O)CC[C@@H](C(=O)O)N)C(=O)NCC(=O)O)[C@@H](C(=O)O)N

Properties
Chemical formula	C_{20}H_{32}N_{6}O_{12}S_{2}
Molar mass	612.63 g·mol^{−1}
- Except where otherwise noted, data are given for materials in their standard state (at 25 °C [77 °F], 100 kPa). verify (what is ?) Infobox references

Glutathione disulfide (GSSG) is a disulfide derived from two glutathione molecules.

In living cells, glutathione disulfide is reduced into two molecules of glutathione with reducing equivalents from the coenzyme NADPH. This reaction is catalyzed by the enzyme glutathione reductase.

Antioxidant enzymes, such as glutathione peroxidases and peroxiredoxins, generate glutathione disulfide during the reduction of peroxides such as hydrogen peroxide (H_{2}O_{2}) and organic hydroperoxides (ROOH):

2 GSH + ROOH → GSSG + ROH + H_{2}O

Other enzymes, such as glutaredoxins, generate glutathione disulfide through thiol-disulfide exchange with protein disulfide bonds or other low molecular mass compounds, such as coenzyme A disulfide or dehydroascorbic acid.

2 GSH + R-S-S-R → GSSG + 2 RSH

The GSH:GSSG ratio is therefore an important bioindicator of cellular health, with a higher ratio signifying less oxidative stress in the organism. A lower ratio may even be indicative of neurodegenerative diseases, such as Parkinson's disease (PD) and Alzheimer's disease.

== Neuromodulator ==
GSSG, along with glutathione and S-nitrosoglutathione (GSNO), have been found to bind to the glutamate recognition site of the NMDA and AMPA receptors (via their γ-glutamyl moieties), and may be endogenous neuromodulators. At millimolar concentrations, they may also modulate the redox state of the NMDA receptor complex.

== See also ==
- Glutathione-ascorbate cycle
- Antioxidant
