= Dehydroascorbic acid =

Metabolite of vitamin C

Names
- IUPAC name L-threo-Hexo-2,3-diulosono-1,4-lactone
- Systematic IUPAC name (5R)-5-[(1S)-1,2-Dihydroxyethyl]oxolane-2,3,4-trione

Identifiers
CAS Number	490-83-5
3D model (JSmol)	Interactive image
ChEBI	CHEBI:27956
ChemSpider	389547
ECHA InfoCard	100.007.019
IUPHAR/BPS	4733
PubChem CID	440667
UNII	Y2Z3ZTP9UM
CompTox Dashboard (EPA)	DTXSID00912316
- InChI: InChI=1S/C6H6O6/c7-1-2(8)5-3(9)4(10)6(11)12-5/h2,5,7-8H,1H2/t2-,5+/m0/s1 Key: SBJKKFFYIZUCET-JLAZNSOCSA-N; InChI=1/C6H6O6/c7-1-2(8)5-3(9)4(10)6(11)12-5/h2,5,7-8H,1H2/t2-,5+/m0/s1 Key: SBJKKFFYIZUCET-JLAZNSOCBE
- SMILES: O=C1C(=O)C(=O)O[C@@H]1[C@@H](O)CO

Properties
Chemical formula	C_{6}H_{6}O_{6}
Molar mass	174.108 g·mol^{−1}
- Except where otherwise noted, data are given for materials in their standard state (at 25 °C [77 °F], 100 kPa). verify (what is ?) Infobox references

Dehydroascorbic acid (DHA) is the major oxidized form of ascorbic acid (vitamin C). It is actively imported into the endoplasmic reticulum of cells via glucose transporters. It is trapped therein by reduction back to ascorbic acid by glutathione and other thiols. The (free) chemical radical semidehydroascorbic acid (SDA) also belongs to the group of oxidized ascorbic acids.

== Structure and physiology ==

Top: ascorbic acid
(reduced form of vitamin C)
Bottom: dehydroascorbic acid
(nominal oxidized form of vitamin C)

Although sodium-dependent transporters for vitamin C exists, it is present mainly in specialized cells whereas the glucose transporters, most notably GLUT1, transport DHA in most cells, where recycling back to ascorbic acid generates the necessary enzyme cofactor and intracellular antioxidant, (see Transport to mitochondria).

The structure shown here for DHA is the commonly shown textbook structure. This 1,2,3-tricarbonyl is too electrophilic to survive more than a few milliseconds in aqueous solution, however. The actual structure shown by spectroscopic studies is the result of rapid hemiketal formation between the 6-OH and the 3-carbonyl groups. Hydration of the 2-carbonyl is also observed. The lifetime of the stabilized species is commonly said to be about 6 minutes under biological conditions. Destruction results from irreversible hydrolysis of the lactone bond, with additional degradation reactions following. Crystallization of solutions of DHA gives a pentacyclic dimer structure of indefinite stability. Recycling of vitamin C via active transport of DHA into cells, followed by reduction and reuse, mitigates the inability of humans to synthesize it from glucose.

Hydration equilibria of DHA - center hemiketal structure is the predominant species in aqueous solutions.

=== Transport to mitochondria ===
Vitamin C accumulates in mitochondria, where most of the free radicals are produced, by entering as DHA through the glucose transporter GLUT10. Ascorbic acid protects the mitochondrial genome and membrane.

=== Transport to the brain ===
Vitamin C does not pass from the bloodstream into the brain, although the brain is one of the organs that have the greatest concentration of vitamin C. Instead, DHA is transported through the blood–brain barrier via GLUT1 transporters, and then reduced back to ascorbic acid.

== Use ==
Dehydroascorbic acid has been used as a vitamin C dietary supplement.

As a cosmetic ingredient, dehydroascorbic acid is used to enhance the appearance of the skin. It may be used in a process for permanent waving of hair and in a process for sunless tanning of skin.

In a cell culture growth medium, dehydroascorbic acid has been used to assure the uptake of vitamin C into cell types that do not contain ascorbic acid transporters.

As a pharmaceutical agent, some research has suggested that administration of dehydroascorbic acid may confer protection from neuronal injury following an ischemic stroke. The literature contains many reports on the antiviral effects of vitamin C, and one study suggests dehydroascorbic acid has stronger antiviral effects and a different mechanism of action than ascorbic acid. Solutions in water containing ascorbic acid and copper ions and/or peroxide, resulting in rapid oxidation of ascorbic acid to dehydroascorbic acid, have been shown to possess powerful but short-lived antimicrobial, antifungal, and antiviral properties, and have been used to treat gingivitis, periodontal disease, and dental plaque. A pharmaceutical product named Ascoxal is an example of such a solution used as a mouth rinse as an oral mucolytic and prophylactic agent against gingivitis. Ascoxal solution has also been tested with positive results as a treatment for recurrent mucocutaneous herpes, and as a mucolytic agent in acute and chronic pulmonary disease such as emphysema, bronchitis, and asthma by aerosol inhalation.
