= Selenoprotein =

Type of protein

In molecular biology, a selenoprotein is any protein that includes a selenocysteine (Sec, U, Se-Cys) amino acid residue. Among functionally characterized selenoproteins are five glutathione peroxidases (GPX) and three thioredoxin reductases, (TrxR/TXNRD) which both contain only one Sec. Selenoprotein P is the most common selenoprotein found in the plasma. It is unusual because in humans it contains 10 Sec residues, which are split into two domains, a longer N-terminal domain that contains 1 Sec, and a shorter C-terminal domain that contains 9 Sec. The longer N-terminal domain is likely an enzymatic domain, and the shorter C-terminal domain is likely a means of safely transporting the very reactive selenium atom throughout the body.

== Species distribution ==
Selenoproteins exist in all major domains of life, eukaryotes, bacteria and archaea. Among eukaryotes, selenoproteins appear to be common in animals, but rare or absent in other phyla—one has been identified in the green alga Chlamydomonas, but almost none in other plants or in fungi. The American cranberry (Vaccinium macrocarpon Ait.) is the only land plant known (as of 2014) to possess sequence-level machinery for producing selenocysteine (specifically in its mitochondrial genome), although its level of functionality is not yet determined. Among fungi, the order Harpellales was "particularly well represented" amongst fungal species found to possess selenocysteine, as 7 out of the 8 Harpellales species analyzed are believed to utilize selenoproteins

Among bacteria and archaea, selenoproteins are only present in some lineages, while they are completely absent in many other phylogenetic groups. These observations have now been confirmed by whole genome analysis, which shows the presence or absence of selenoprotein genes and accessory genes for the synthesis of selenoproteins in the respective organism.

== Production ==
Selenoproteins, like regular proteins, are made by the ribosome, which requires residues to be carried by tRNAs. Selenocystine (Sec) has its special tRNA^{Sec} for this purpose. This tRNA, unlike other tRNAs, is not directly loaded with the selenocystyl residue from a free Sec molecule; instead, it is first loaded with a seryl residue from serine by the conventional seryl-tRNA synthetase (forming Ser-tRNA^{Sec}), then an enzyme converts this seryl into a selenocystyl residue, forming Sec-tRNA^{Sec}. In bacteria, L-seryl-tRNASec selenium transferase (SelA) performs this work using the selenium provided by selenophosphate. In archaea and eukarya, this happens first by phosphoseryl-tRNA kinase attaching a phosphate group to the seryl, then by SepSecS converting the phosphoseryl to selenocystyl with the help of selenophosphate.

The structure of tRNA^{Sec} is different from typical (canonical) tRNAs by the lengthening of the D-stem and a very long variable loop. This prevents the usual EF-Tu (eEF1A in eukaryotes) from recognizing the tRNA. Instead, a special elongation factor called SelB is needed to help the ribosome use Sec-tRNA^{Sec}. SelB consists of two protein domains: the N-terminal part is highly homologous to EF-Tu and serves to provide the elongation action, and the C-terminal part serves to recognize the SECIS element on the mRNA coding for the selenoprotein. Together, the two parts allow SelB to carry the Sec-tRNA^{Sec} to the ribosome's A site for the UGA codon to be decoded. In bacteria, the SECIS element occurs soon after the UGA codon it activates.

The situation with SECIS in eukarya and archaea is less clear as of 2006, as the SECIS element instead occurs in the untranslated regions of the mRNA. The eukaryote homolog of SelB (EEFSEC) instead has a C-terminal domain that binds to SECISBP2 (SBP2), which carries out the actual binding of SECIS RNA. Other SECIS RNA binding proteins also exist, notably including 60S ribosomal protein L30. The archaeal homolog of SelB does not seem to have any special extension, so how it interacts with the SECIS is even less clear.

The final question is how the ribosome is able to know the UGA is supposed to be coding for Sec instead of the stop codon. This question is again relatively easy to answer in bacteria, but in eukarya and archaea it presumably has some dependency on the recognition of SECIS.

=== Replacement by cysteine in mammals ===
Most mammal selenoproteins have a small amount (about 10%) of the selenocystine replaced by cystine, increasing to 50% on selenium-deficient diets. This is achieved by SLA/LP accepting thiophosphate instead of selenophosphate, thereby converting the phosphoseryl into a regular cystyl.

=== Non-UAG (CUA) tRNA ===
Examples of recoded versions of the tRNA^{Sec} have been found in nature. These cover the stop codon UAA and 10 sense codons.

== Redox activity ==
Most selenoproteins have a redox function analogous to proteins with Cys active sites. Two residues of Sec can be oxidized to form a diselenide bond (-Se-Se-), the selenium analog of the disulfide bridge. Sec can also form a selenenyl sulfide (-Se-S-) bond with Cys.

The Se-H bond is more easily broken than the S-H bond, resulting in higher reactivity of the Sec residue compared to Cys. Also contributing to reactivity is the higher nucleophilicity, acidity, and leaving-group ability of selenolate (R-Se^{-}) compared to thiolate (R-S^{-}). The Se-Se bond is also weaker than the S-S bond. The result is that the Sec can easily be oxidized and reduced, without much change of getting stuck in one state.

Sec is not more reactive than Cys in every single aspect. Selanyl radicals generated from Sec is less prone to attacking aromatic amino acid residues and protein Cα atoms than the thiyl radicals generated from Cys. This offers redox-active selenoproteins some protection from breaking itself apart compared to their cystine-only relatives.

== Major families ==
The barrier for a regular protein to become a selenoprotein is relatively high due to the requirement for a SECIS element. As a result, new selenoprotein families do not easily appear. It is also not uncommon for these families to include non-selenoprotein descendants, as (mainly terristial) selenium-poor environments provide a fitness advantage to an organism that has lower requirements of selenium. The below will focus on families found in humans.

=== Glutathione peroxidase ===
Glutathione peroxidases (GPx) are enzymes that use glutathione to break down peroxides, protecting the cell from oxidative damage. It is a key part of animal (including human) antioxidant defenses. They are also found in bacteria, plants, and fungi. GPx was the first selenoprotein discovered, with a highly reactive Sec residue at the active site. Comparison of GPx sequences from all these types of life suggest that the ancestral GPx did not contain selenium; instead, acquision of Sec happened early in animal evolution, before the sponges diverged from other animals.

Humans have eight Gpx genes, but only five of them contain Sec (GPX1, GPX2, GPX3, GPX4, GPX6). The non-existence of Sec in GPX7 and GPX8 appears to be universal among animals. The loss of Sec (by replacement with Cys) in GPX5 was, however, a relatively recent event that happened after the divergence of humans from rodents. Rodents have independently lost the Sec in Gpx6, but kept it in their version of Gpx5. Human GPX5 and rodent Gpx6 retain vestigial SECIS elements indicative of their past.

=== Thioredoxin reductase ===
Thioredoxin reductase is also a key component of antioxidant defense. Although enzymes carrying out this function is found in most forms of life, the high-molecular-weight selenoprotein version found in animals evolved separately from the more common low-molecular-weight version. This version appears as a branch within the glutathione reductases, again a key component of antioxidant defense.

=== Iodothyronine deiodinase ===
Central to human (and vertebrate in general) thyroid hormone metabolism are three iodothyronine deiodinases, with gene symbols DIO1, DIO2, DIO3 in humans. Related proteins have been found in invertebrate chordates, mostly with a selenocystine, though a few have cystine instead.

=== Selenophosphate synthetase ===
The production of selenoprotein cannot occur without selenophosphate, which is produced by selenophosphate synthetase. Vertebrates including humans carry two versions of this enzyme, with one (SEPHS2) being a selenoprotein and the other (SEPHS1) replacing it with a threonine, though still with a vestigial SECIS element. Analysis of animal versions of this enzyme show that the original animal version is a selenoprotein, with SEPHS1 arising later through gene duplication.

Among prokaryotes, most bacteria have a version with cystine instad of selenocystine, suggesting that this may be the ancestral state (which would avoid the chicken-and-egg problem). Some have two versions, one with Sec and the other with Cys. Archaea mostly have the Sec version.

=== Selenoproteins H, T, V, W, and MIEN1 ===
The human selenoproteins H (SELENOH), T (SELENOT), and V (SELENOV), W (SELENOW), are related to each other and the non-selenoprotein MIEN1(or RDX12). The version of Rdx12 in fish is a selenoprotein, suggesting that the human lineage lost the Sec during evolution on land. All of these fold similarly to thioredoxin and serve a redox function.

=== Other families ===
Families existing as selenoproteins in humans and other mammals:

- Selenoprotein I (also called EPT1), an ethanolaminephosphotransferase.
- Selenoprotein K and Selenoprotein S are small transmembrane proteins found on the ER menbrane.
- Selenoprotein M and Selenoprotein F, thioredoxin-like proteins found in the endoplasmic reticulum (ER).
- Selenoprotein N, a large transmembran proteins found on the ER menbrane.
- Selenoprotein O, protein found in the mitochondrial, probably with a redox function.
- Selenoprotein P is an extracellular glycoprotein, unusually with more than one Sec residue (usually several), found in eukaryotes including humans. The precise number of residues vary and appears linked to the selenium needs of the organism.
- Selenoprotein R (MSRB1) is a peptide-methionine (R)-S-oxide reductase. It has two non-selenoprotein relatives in humans, also of the same catalytic activity.

Families only existing as non-seleno-proteins in mammals:

- Selenoprotein U, found in three versions in humans, with Cys instead of Sec.

Bacterial selenoproteins include:

- Escherichia coli: FdhH-, FdhN- & FdhO-complex

== Clinical significance ==
Selenium is a vital nutrient in animals, including humans. About 25 different selenocysteine-containing selenoproteins have so far been observed in human cells and tissues. Since lack of selenium deprives the cell of its ability to synthesize selenoproteins, many health effects of low selenium intake are believed to be caused by the lack of one or more specific selenoproteins. Three selenoproteins, TXNRD1 (TR1), TXNRD2 (TR3) and glutathione peroxidase 4 (GPX4), have been shown to be essential in mouse knockout experiments. On the other hand, too much dietary selenium causes toxic effects and can lead to selenium poisoning. The threshold between essential and toxic concentrations of this element is rather narrow with a factor in the range of 10-100.

Mutations in Selenoprotein N (SELENON, formerly SEPN1) in humans cause a subtype of congenital muscular dystrophy known as SELENON-related myopathy or rigid spine syndrome.

== Related systems ==
The prokaryotes contain unusual systems related to the typical tRNA-SelAB system.

- Some archaeons such as Methanocaldococcus jannaschii do not have a cysteine—tRNA ligase. Instead they probably make cystyl-rRNA in through seryl-tRNA and phosphoseryl-tRNA, analogous to the Sec-tRNA production route in eukarya and archaea.
- Some bacteria with the Sec machinery also have a noncanonical tRNA^{Cys}_{GCA} or tRNA^{Cys}_{UCA}. They are recognized by the usual Cysteine—tRNA ligase, but needs the help of SelB to work. The tRNA^{Cys}_{UCA} type, also called tRNA^{ReC}, can cause Cys to be inserted instead of Sec at UGA. This might help the bacterium cope with a lack of selenium.
  - Some versions of tRNA^{ReC} have further mutated to be recognized by the seryl-tRNA synthase and SelA, making them a second kind of tRNA^{Sec}. This is proposed to be called tRNA^{ReU}. ReU is not as efficient as the standard tRNA^{Sec}.
- Some bacteria also have so-caleed allo-tRNAs, which have an acceptor domain similar to tRNA^{Sec}. They appear to cause some other amino acid to be replaced by serine.

There are also lab-modified versions of the tRNA-SelAB system.

- Shorter D-stem: To understand the role of the unusual long D-stem in tRNA^{Sec}, artificial variants with shorter D-stems were put into E. coli. It turns out that these variants work faster than the standard version at regular temperatures but easily lose function at high temperatures. This suggests that the long D-stem evolved as an adaptation to high temperature.
- Removal of SelB and SECIS requirement: In 2013, a new kind of tRNA was artificially created by putting the acceptor stem and CUA anticodon of E. coli tRNA^{Sec} on the backbone of E. coli tRNA^{Ser}. This new tRNA^{UTu} can be recognized by ordinary EF-Tu, removing the requirement for SelB and SECIS for elongation. However, about 40% of the insertions were serine instead of selenocystine, suggesting that SelA is not efficiently recognizing this tRNA. In 2014, directed evolution was used to greatly improve the ability of tRNA^{UTu} to be recognized by SelA, achieving a version that results in no detected misincorporation of serine. This enables simple replacement of any residue by Sec in future protein engineering efforts.
  - By 2018, the E. coli system has matured to be suitable for "industrial scale" production. In one case this was achieved by laboratory evolution. In another case this was achieved by incorporating elements of allo-tRNAs.
  - The tRNA^{UTu} system was adapted to Saccharomyces cerevisiae (yeast), which has no natural selenocystine system, in 2023. A mixture of bacterial and mouse enzymes work on a modified yeast tRNA^{Ser}, which is able to be recognized by eEF1A.

== Other types of selenium in proteins ==
=== Ligand selanoproteins ===
Besides the selenocysteine-containing selenoproteins, there are also some selenoproteins known from bacterial species, which have selenium bound noncovalently. Most of these proteins are thought to contain a selenide-ligand to a molybdopterin cofactor at their active sites (e.g. nicotinate dehydrogenase of Eubacterium barkeri, or xanthine dehydrogenases).

=== Random selenomethionine ===
In addition, selenium occurs in proteins as nonspecifically incorporated selenomethionine, which replaces methionine residues. Proteins containing such nonspecifically incorporated selenomethionine residues are not regarded as selenoproteins, as the incorporation of selenium is not required for any function of the protein.

In bacteria, the replacement of methionine by selenomethionine is mostly tolerated.

In animals, an excess amount of selenomethionine replacement results in "alkali disease" affecting the structure of keratin and other tissue proteins. This is a major mechanism of selenium toxicity in animals.

The nonspecific incorporation and the relative tolerance of bacteria to selenomethionine substitution has been used to determine the structure of proteins. A protein is produced with all methionines replaced by selenomethionines via expression in a microorganism grown in selenomethionine. This allows the use of MAD-phasing during X-ray crystallographic structure determination of many proteins.

=== Random selenocystine ===
Just as selenomethionine can be randomly incorporated into proteins, selenocystine can also be mistakenly attached to tRNA^{Cys} by cysteinyl-tRNA synthetase and incorporated into proteins in lieu of cystine. This causes considerable toxicity. A variant synthase that can distinguish between Cys and Sec helps reduce toxicity.

This toxicity may be one reason for the existence of a rather complicated pathway of selenocysteine biosynthesis and specific incorporation into selenoproteins (described above), which avoids the occurrence of the free amino acid as intermediate. Due to this pathway, even if a selenocysteine-containing selenoprotein is taken up in the diet and used as selenium source, the selenocysteine residue is not reused directly.

=== Non-protein biomolecules ===
Selenium is also specifically incorporated into modified bases of some tRNAs (as 5-methylaminomethyl-2-selenouridine) by the bacterial enzyme tRNA 2-selenouridine synthase (EC 2.9.1.3).

== See also ==
- SECIS element
- Mercury poisoning
