= Serine–tRNA ligase, cytoplasmic =

Enzyme found in humans

SARS1

Identifiers
- Aliases: SARS1, SERRS, SERS, seryl-tRNA synthetase, NEDMAS, SARS, seryl-tRNA synthetase 1
- External IDs: OMIM: 607529; MGI: 102809; GeneCards: SARS1
Available structures
PDB	Ortholog search: PDBe RCSB
PDB	List of PDB id codes 3VBB, 4L87, 4RQE, 4RQF
Enzyme activity
EC #	BRENDA	ExPASy	KEGG	MetaCyc
6.1.1.11	↗	↗	↗	↗

Gene location (Mouse)
Chr.	Chromosome 3 (mouse)
Band	3 F3|3 47.08 cM	Start	108,332,181 bp
Band	3 F3|3 47.08 cM	End	108,352,525 bp
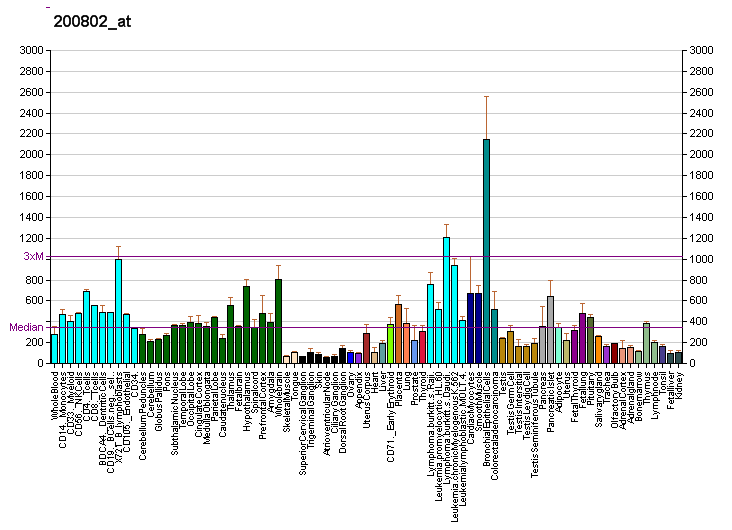
RNA expression pattern
Bgee	Human / Mouse (ortholog); Top expressed in: islet of Langerhans; body of pancreas; frontal pole; parotid gland; Brodmann area 10; upper lobe of left lung; gastric mucosa; skin of abdomen; body of stomach; ganglionic eminence / Top expressed in: seminal vesicula; facial motor nucleus; lacrimal gland; calvaria; yolk sac; anterior horn of spinal cord; neural layer of retina; superior frontal gyrus; dentate gyrus of hippocampal formation granule cell; endothelial cell of lymphatic vessel; More reference expression data
BioGPS	More reference expression data
Gene ontology
Molecular function	aminoacyl-tRNA ligase activity; nucleotide binding; ligase activity; selenocysteine-tRNA ligase activity; ATP binding; RNA binding; core promoter sequence-specific DNA binding; serine-tRNA ligase activity; protein binding; protein homodimerization activity; DNA binding; RNA polymerase II cis-regulatory region sequence-specific DNA binding
Cellular component	extracellular exosome; cytosol; cytoplasm; nucleus
Biological process	tRNA processing; tRNA aminoacylation for protein translation; protein biosynthesis; selenocysteine metabolic process; selenocysteinyl-tRNA(Sec) biosynthetic process; negative regulation of transcription by RNA polymerase II; seryl-tRNA aminoacylation; negative regulation of angiogenesis; negative regulation of vascular endothelial growth factor production; transcription, DNA-templated; regulation of transcription, DNA-templated
Sources:Amigo / QuickGO
Orthologs
Databases	NCBI: entry
Species	Human	Mouse
Entrez	6301	20226
Ensembl	n/a	ENSMUSG00000068739
UniProt	P49591	P26638
RefSeq (mRNA)	NM_006513; NM_001330669	NM_001204979; NM_011319
RefSeq (protein)	NP_001317598; NP_006504	NP_001191908; NP_035449
Location (UCSC)	n/a	Chr 3: 108.33 – 108.35 Mb
PubMed search
- Wikidata
View/Edit Human	View/Edit Mouse

Serine–tRNA ligase, cytoplasmic, also called seryl-tRNA synthetase 1 is an enzyme that in humans is encoded by the gene SARS1 (previously SARS). SARS1 belongs to the class II amino-acyl tRNA family and is found in all humans, and functions as a serine–tRNA ligase which is involved in protein translation and is related to several bacterial and yeast counterparts.

== Discovery ==
Since the 1960s, seryl-tRNA synthetases have been described in various eukaryotic species, in both biochemical and structural analyses. It was not until 1997 that human SARS1 and its enzyme product were isolated and expressed in Escherichia coli by a team from The European Molecular Biology Laboratory in France.

== Protein ==
Cytoplasmic Serine–tRNA ligase is made up of 514 amino acid residues as weighs 58,777 Da. It exists as a homodimer of two identical subunits, with the tRNA molecule binding across the dimer by similarity. It has two distinct domains:

- A catalytic core
- A 3 base pair serine binding N-terminal extension

== Function and mechanism ==
Cytoplasmic serine–tRNA ligase is involved in protein translation; specifically, catalysing the transfer of the amino acid serine to its corresponding (cognate) transfer RNA (tRNA^{Ser}). The cytosolic enzyme recognises its cognate tRNA species and binds with a high level of specificity, allowing the accurate interaction between corresponding codons and anticodons on mRNA and tRNA during protein translation.

Beyond serine, serine–tRNA ligases are also involved in the incorporation of the non-standard amino acid selenocysteine into selenoproteins. In particular, they can also catalyze the mischarging of serine onto the tRNA associated to selenocysteine, tRNA^{Sec}. The serine is then converted into selenocysteine in a two step process by the enzymes L-seryl-tRNA(Sec) kinase (EC 2.7.1.164), and SepSecS (EC 2.9.1.2).

== Medical significance ==
Pathogenic mutations are the cause of a condition with symptoms including developmental disabilities, seizures, and problems with muscle coordination (ataxia), which is called NEDMAS (Neurodevelopmental disorder with microcephaly, ataxia, and seizures).

== See also ==
- Serine–tRNA ligase, mitochondrial (SARS2)
