= MSRB =

MSRB may refer to:

- Karl G. Maeser Building, Brigham Young University
- Municipal Securities Rulemaking Board, an organisation
- Peptide-methionine (R)-S-oxide reductase (MsrB), an enzyme

== See also ==
- MSRB1
- MSRB2
- MSRBI, MSRBII, and MSRBIII, Medical Science Research Buildings at Michigan Medicine
