= Selenoprotein F =

Protein found in humans

SELENOF

Identifiers
- Aliases: SELENOF, selenoprotein F, SEP15
- External IDs: OMIM: 606254; MGI: 1927947; GeneCards: SELENOF

Gene location (Human)
Chr.	Chromosome 1 (human)
Band	1p22.3	Start	86,862,445 bp
Band	1p22.3	End	86,914,424 bp

Gene location (Mouse)
Chr.	Chromosome 3 (mouse)
Band	3|3 H2	Start	144,276,065 bp
Band	3|3 H2	End	144,303,441 bp
RNA expression pattern
Bgee	Human / Mouse (ortholog); Top expressed in: islet of Langerhans; retinal pigment epithelium; corpus epididymis; seminal vesicula; monocyte; stromal cell of endometrium; caput epididymis; gallbladder; epithelium of nasopharynx; mucosa of paranasal sinus / Top expressed in: seminal vesicula; parotid gland; optic nerve; right lung lobe; molar; olfactory epithelium; stroma of bone marrow; lobe of prostate; right kidney; median eminence; More reference expression data
BioGPS	n/a
Gene ontology
Molecular function	selenium binding; protein binding
Cellular component	endoplasmic reticulum; endoplasmic reticulum lumen
Biological process	'de novo' posttranslational protein folding
Sources:Amigo / QuickGO
Orthologs
Databases	NCBI: entry; OMA: entry
Species	Human	Mouse
Entrez	9403	93684
Ensembl	ENSG00000183291	ENSMUSG00000037072
UniProt	O60613	Q9ERR7
RefSeq (mRNA)	NM_004261; NM_203341	NM_053102
RefSeq (protein)	NP_004252; NP_976086	NP_444332
Location (UCSC)	Chr 1: 86.86 – 86.91 Mb	Chr 3: 144.28 – 144.3 Mb
PubMed search
- Wikidata
View/Edit Human	View/Edit Mouse

Selenoprotein F is a protein that in humans is encoded by the SELENOF gene (previously SEP15). Two alternatively spliced transcript variants encoding distinct isoforms have been found for this gene.

== Function ==
This gene encodes a selenoprotein, which contains a selenocysteine (Sec) residue at its active site. The selenocysteine is encoded by the UGA codon that normally signals translation termination. The 3' UTR of selenoprotein genes have a common stem-loop structure, the sec insertion sequence (SECIS), that is necessary for the recognition of UGA as a Sec codon rather than as a stop signal. Studies in mouse suggest that this selenoprotein may have redox function and may be involved in the quality control of protein folding.

== Clinical significance ==
This gene is localized on chromosome 1p31, a genetic locus commonly mutated or deleted in human cancers.

== Protein domain ==
Sep15
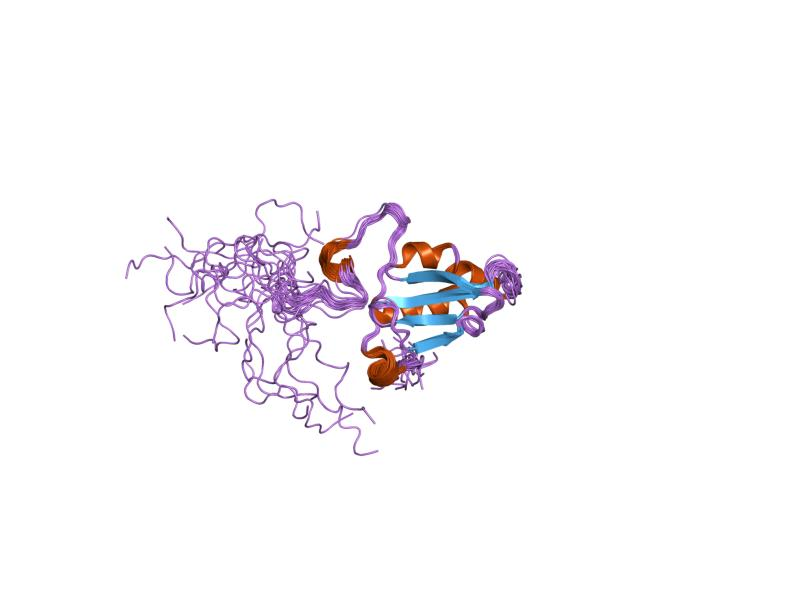
- Solution structure of SelM from Mus musculus

Identifiers
- Symbol: Sep15_SelM
- Pfam: PF08806
- InterPro: IPR014912
Available protein structures:
- PDB: IPR014912 PF08806 (ECOD; PDBsum)
- AlphaFold: IPR014912; PF08806

The protein this gene encodes for is often called Sep15 however in the case of mice, it is named SelM. This protein is a selenoprotein only found in eukaryotes. This domain has a thioredoxin-like domain and a surface accessible active site redox motif. This suggests that they function as thiol-disulfide isomerases involved in disulfide bond formation in the endoplasmic reticulum.

=== Function ===
Recent studies have shown in mice, where the SEP15 gene has been silenced the mice subsequently became deficient in SEP15 and were able to inhibit the development of colorectal cancer.

=== Structure ===
The particular structure has an alpha/beta central domain which is actually made up of three alpha helices and a mixed parallel/anti-parallel four-stranded beta-sheet.
