= Selenoprotein P =

Protein found in humans

SELENOP

Identifiers
- Aliases: SELENOP, SELP, SeP, SEPP, SEPP1, selenoprotein P, plasma, 1, selenoprotein P
- External IDs: OMIM: 601484; MGI: 894288; GeneCards: SELENOP

Gene location (Human)
Chr.	Chromosome 5 (human)
Band	5p12	Start	42,799,880 bp
Band	5p12	End	42,887,392 bp

Gene location (Mouse)
Chr.	Chromosome 15 (mouse)
Band	15 A1|15 1.84 cM	Start	3,298,029 bp
Band	15 A1|15 1.84 cM	End	3,309,990 bp
RNA expression pattern
Bgee	Human / Mouse (ortholog); Top expressed in: jejunal mucosa; germinal epithelium; superficial temporal artery; parietal pleura; caput epididymis; inferior ganglion of vagus nerve; visceral pleura; corpus epididymis; pars reticulata; lactiferous duct / Top expressed in: stroma of bone marrow; intestinal villus; sciatic nerve; iris; jejunum; left lobe of liver; mesenteric lymph nodes; right kidney; ileum; calvaria; More reference expression data
BioGPS	n/a
Gene ontology
Molecular function	selenium binding
Cellular component	extracellular exosome; platelet dense granule lumen; extracellular region; extracellular space
Biological process	brain development; post-embryonic development; sexual reproduction; response to oxidative stress; locomotory behavior; selenium compound metabolic process; platelet degranulation; growth; response to selenium ion; regulation of growth
Sources:Amigo / QuickGO
Orthologs
Databases	NCBI: entry; OMA: entry
Species	Human	Mouse
Entrez	6414	20363
Ensembl	ENSG00000250722	ENSMUSG00000064373
UniProt	P49908	P70274
RefSeq (mRNA)	NM_005410; NM_001085486; NM_001093726	NM_001042613; NM_001042614; NM_009155
RefSeq (protein)	NP_001078955; NP_001087195; NP_005401	NP_001036078; NP_001036079; NP_033181
Location (UCSC)	Chr 5: 42.8 – 42.89 Mb	Chr 15: 3.3 – 3.31 Mb
PubMed search
- Wikidata
View/Edit Human	View/Edit Mouse

SelP, N terminus

Identifiers
- Symbol: SelP_N
- Pfam: PF04592
- Pfam clan: CL0172
- InterPro: IPR007671
Available protein structures:
- PDB: IPR007671 PF04592 (ECOD; PDBsum)
- AlphaFold: IPR007671; PF04592

SelP, C terminus

Identifiers
- Symbol: SelP_C
- Pfam: PF04593
- InterPro: IPR007672
Available protein structures:
- PDB: IPR007672 PF04593 (ECOD; PDBsum)
- AlphaFold: IPR007672; PF04593

Selenoprotein P is a protein that in humans is encoded by the SELENOP gene.

Selenoprotein P is the only known eukaryotic selenoprotein that contains multiple selenocysteine (Sec). These residues are encoded by the UGA codon that normally signals translation termination. In humans, rats, and mice, it contains 10 Sec residues, one located at the C-terminal side of protein and others at the N-terminal side. It is a heparin-binding protein that appears to be associated with endothelial cells, and has been implicated to function as an antioxidant in the extracellular space. Several transcript variants, encoding either the same or different isoform, have been found for this gene.

It is a secreted glycoprotein, often found in the plasma. Its precise function remains to be elucidated; however, it is thought to have antioxidant properties. This particular protein contains two domains: the C terminal and N terminal domain. The N-terminal domain is larger than the C terminal

== Structure ==
The N-terminal region always contains one Sec residue, and this is separated from the C-terminal region (9-16 Sec residues) by a histidine-rich sequence. The large number of Sec residues in the C-terminal portion of Selenoprotein P suggests that it may be involved in selenium transport or storage. However, it is also possible that this region has a redox function.

=== N terminal domain ===
N-terminal domain allows conservation of whole body selenium and appears to supply selenium to the kidney.

The structure of the N-terminal domain is larger and contains less Selenium. However it is thought to be heavily glycosylated.

=== C terminal domain ===
The function of the C-terminal domain is known to be vital for maintaining levels of selenium in brain and testis tissue but not for the maintenance of whole-body selenium.

The C-terminal domain is smaller in size but far more rich in selenium.

== Function ==
Selenoprotein P may have antioxidant properties. It can attach to epithelial cells, and may protect vascular endothelial cells against peroxynitrite toxicity. The high selenium content of Selenoprotein P suggests that it may be involved in selenium intercellular transport or storage. The promoter structure of bovine Selenoprotein P suggests that it may be involved in countering heavy metal intoxication, and may also have a developmental function.

== Animal models ==
Mice and dogs with knock-out variants in their SELENOP homologues (Selenop and SELENOP respectively) may develop cerebellar ataxia phenotypes. SELENOP and neural precursor cell levels in mouse brains increase post-exercise. Mice engineered to lack SELENOP did not increase neural precursors.

== Protein interactions ==
Binds to heparin in a pH-dependent manner
