= EPT =

EPT may refer to:

== Science and technology ==
- Extended Page Table, in Intel x86 microprocessors
- Ethanolaminephosphotransferase, an enzyme
- Ethylpropyltryptamine, a psychedelic drug
- Ephemeroptera, Plecoptera, and Trichoptera, orders of insects that provide an indication of water quality

== Other uses ==
- CaMLA English Placement Test, a language proficiency test
- Effective performance time, in aviation medicine
- Electroputere, a Romanian rolling stock manufacturer
- Epsilon Pi Tau, an honor society
- Estrogen Progestin Therapy, a Hormone replacement therapy
- European Poker Tour
- Excess profits tax, a tax on returns or profits which exceed risk-adjusted normal returns
- Hellenic Broadcasting Corporation (Greek: Ελληνική Ραδιοφωνία Τηλεόραση), the public broadcaster of Greece
- Tunisia Polytechnic School (French: Ecole Polytechnique de Tunisie)
