= Selenoprotein N =

Protein found in humans

SELENON

Identifiers
- Aliases: SELENON, CFTD, MDRS1, RSMD1, RSS, SELN, SEPN1, selenoprotein N, 1, selenoprotein N
- External IDs: OMIM: 606210; MGI: 2151208; GeneCards: SELENON

Gene location (Human)
Chr.	Chromosome 1 (human)
Band	1p36.11	Start	25,800,193 bp
Band	1p36.11	End	25,818,221 bp

Gene location (Mouse)
Chr.	Chromosome 4 (mouse)
Band	4|4 D3	Start	134,265,203 bp
Band	4|4 D3	End	134,279,477 bp
RNA expression pattern
Bgee	Human / Mouse (ortholog); Top expressed in: stromal cell of endometrium; ventricular zone; ganglionic eminence; apex of heart; smooth muscle tissue; right lobe of thyroid gland; gastric mucosa; left lobe of thyroid gland; right ovary; upper lobe of left lung / Top expressed in: granulocyte; external carotid artery; internal carotid artery; interventricular septum; molar; atrium; Gonadal ridge; dermis; mandibular prominence; maxillary prominence; More reference expression data
BioGPS	n/a
Gene ontology
Molecular function	calcium ion binding; protein binding; oxidoreductase activity
Cellular component	endoplasmic reticulum membrane; endoplasmic reticulum; membrane
Biological process	regulation of ryanodine-sensitive calcium-release channel activity; positive regulation of response to oxidative stress; calcium ion homeostasis; skeletal muscle fiber development; respiratory system process; mitochondrion organization; skeletal muscle satellite cell differentiation; skeletal muscle satellite cell maintenance involved in skeletal muscle regeneration; positive regulation of skeletal muscle cell proliferation; response to muscle activity involved in regulation of muscle adaptation; multicellular organismal response to stress; cellular response to oxidative stress; skeletal muscle tissue regeneration; lung alveolus development; cellular response to caffeine
Sources:Amigo / QuickGO
Orthologs
Databases	NCBI: entry; OMA: entry
Species	Human	Mouse
Entrez	57190	74777
Ensembl	ENSG00000162430	ENSMUSG00000050989
UniProt	Q9NZV5	D3Z2R5
RefSeq (mRNA)	NM_206926; NM_020451	NM_029100
RefSeq (protein)	NP_065184; NP_996809	NP_083376
Location (UCSC)	Chr 1: 25.8 – 25.82 Mb	Chr 4: 134.27 – 134.28 Mb
PubMed search
- Wikidata
View/Edit Human	View/Edit Mouse

Selenoprotein N is a protein that in humans is encoded by the SELENON gene (previously SEPN1).

== Function ==
Selenoprotein N is involved in protecting the cell against oxidative stress and regulating calcium levels.

As a selenoprotein, selenoprotein N contains a selenocysteine (Sec) which is residue at its active site. The selenocysteine is encoded by the UGA codon that normally signals translation termination. The 3' UTR of selenoprotein genes have a common stem-loop structure, the sec insertion sequence (SECIS), that is necessary for the recognition of UGA as a Sec codon rather than as a stop signal.

== Medical significance ==
Pathogenic Mutations in SELENON can cause the classical phenotype of multiminicore disease and congenital muscular dystrophy with spinal rigidity and restrictive respiratory syndrome known as SEPN1-related congenital muscular dystrophy or rigid spine syndrome.
