= TRNASer (uridine44-2'-O)-methyltransferase =

TRNASer (uridine^{44}-2'-O)-methyltransferase

Identifiers
- EC no.: 2.1.1.211

Databases
- IntEnz: IntEnz view
- BRENDA: BRENDA entry
- ExPASy: NiceZyme view
- KEGG: KEGG entry
- MetaCyc: metabolic pathway
- PRIAM: profile
- PDB structures: RCSB PDB PDBe PDBsum
Search
- PMC: articles
- PubMed: articles
- NCBI: proteins

TRNASer (uridine^{44}-2'-O)-methyltransferase (EC 2.1.1.211, TRM^{44}) is an enzyme with systematic name S-adenosyl-L-methionine:tRNASer (uridine^{44}-2'-O)-methyltransferase. This enzyme catalyses the following chemical reaction

S-adenosyl-L-methionine + uridine^{44} in tRNASer $\rightleftharpoons$ S-adenosyl-L-homocysteine + 2'-O-methyluridine^{44} in tRNASer

The 2'-O-methylation of uridine^{44} contributes to stability of tRNASer(CGA).
