= EEFSEC =

Enzyme found in humans

Identifiers
- Aliases: EEFSEC, EFSEC, SELB, eukaryotic elongation factor, selenocysteine-tRNA-specific, eukaryotic elongation factor, selenocysteine-tRNA specific
- External IDs: OMIM: 607695; MGI: 2137092; GeneCards: EEFSEC

Gene location (Human)
Chr.	Chromosome 3 (human)
Band	3q21.3	Start	128,153,454 bp
Band	3q21.3	End	128,408,646 bp

Gene location (Mouse)
Chr.	Chromosome 6 (mouse)
Band	6|6 D1	Start	88,234,316 bp
Band	6|6 D1	End	88,423,521 bp
RNA expression pattern
Bgee	Human / Mouse (ortholog); Top expressed in: apex of heart; left ventricle; gastrocnemius muscle; muscle of thigh; granulocyte; right lobe of liver; left uterine tube; skeletal muscle tissue; right auricle of heart; popliteal artery / Top expressed in: spermatocyte; spermatid; yolk sac; seminiferous tubule; left lobe of liver; secondary oocyte; thymus; proximal tubule; right kidney; zygote; More reference expression data
BioGPS	n/a
Gene ontology
Molecular function	tRNA binding; nucleotide binding; ribonucleoprotein complex binding; GTP binding; selenocysteine insertion sequence binding; translation elongation factor activity; GTPase activity
Cellular component	cytoplasm; nucleus; ribonucleoprotein complex
Biological process	selenocysteine incorporation; protein biosynthesis; translational elongation
Sources:Amigo / QuickGO
Orthologs
Databases	NCBI: entry; OMA: entry
Species	Human	Mouse
Entrez	60678	65967
Ensembl	ENSG00000132394	ENSMUSG00000033216
UniProt	P57772	Q9JHW4
RefSeq (mRNA)	NM_021937	NM_023060
RefSeq (protein)	NP_068756	NP_075547
Location (UCSC)	Chr 3: 128.15 – 128.41 Mb	Chr 6: 88.23 – 88.42 Mb
PubMed search
- Wikidata
View/Edit Human	View/Edit Mouse

Selenocysteine-specific elongation factor (eEFSec) is an enzyme that in humans is encoded by the gene EEFSEC (eukaryotic elongation factor, selenocysteine-tRNA specific). This enzyme is involved in incorporating the non-standard amino acid selenocysteine into selenoproteins. In particular, it binds to SECISBP2, and acts as an elongation factor that replaces the eRF1-eRF3-GTP complex for insertion of selenocysteine in response to the opal stop codon UGA. This protein has sometimes been called SELB or eSelB (eukaryotic SelB) in reference to the analogous bacterial enzyme, SelB.

== Medical Significance ==
Pathogenic mutations in EEFSEC are associated with an autosomal recessive disorder called neurodevelopmental disorder with progressive spasticity and brain abnormalities (NEDPSB). Those affected have impaired intellectual development and often struggle with speech. There is also typically muscle dysfunction (hypotonia, delayed walking), which often progresses to spasticity, and some of those affected become wheel-chair bound.
