= C5H11NO4S =

The molecular formula C_{5}H_{11}NO_{4}S (molar mass: 181.21 g/mol) may refer to:

- Acamprosate
- Methionine sulfone
