= Selenoprotein O =

Protein found in humans

SELENOO

Identifiers
- Aliases: SELENOO, selenoprotein O, SELO
- External IDs: OMIM: 607917; MGI: 1919007; GeneCards: SELENOO
Enzyme activity
EC #	BRENDA	ExPASy	KEGG	MetaCyc
2.7.7.108	↗	↗	↗	↗

Gene location (Human)
Chr.	Chromosome 22 (human)
Band	22q13.33	Start	50,201,011 bp
Band	22q13.33	End	50,217,616 bp

Gene location (Mouse)
Chr.	Chromosome 15 (mouse)
Band	15|15 E3	Start	88,973,287 bp
Band	15|15 E3	End	88,984,543 bp
RNA expression pattern
Bgee	Human / Mouse (ortholog); Top expressed in: pancreatic ductal cell; right lobe of liver; right hemisphere of cerebellum; cardia; granulocyte; mucosa of ileum; mucosa of transverse colon; apex of heart; thymus; skin of leg / Top expressed in: left lobe of liver; right kidney; spermatocyte; proximal tubule; granulocyte; lacrimal gland; otolith organ; utricle; submandibular gland; human kidney; More reference expression data
BioGPS	n/a
Gene ontology
Molecular function	nucleotide binding; ATP binding; transferase activity; nucleotidyltransferase activity; metal ion binding; protein adenylyltransferase activity
Cellular component	mitochondrion
Biological process	protein adenylylation
Sources:Amigo / QuickGO
Orthologs
Databases	NCBI: entry; OMA: entry
Species	Human	Mouse
Entrez	83642	223776
Ensembl	ENSG00000073169	ENSMUSG00000035757
UniProt	Q9BVL4	Q9DBC0
RefSeq (mRNA)	NM_031454	NM_027905
RefSeq (protein)	NP_113642	NP_082181
Location (UCSC)	Chr 22: 50.2 – 50.22 Mb	Chr 15: 88.97 – 88.98 Mb
PubMed search
- Wikidata
View/Edit Human	View/Edit Mouse

Selenoprotein O is a protein that in humans is encoded by the SELENOO gene.

== Function ==
This gene encodes a selenoprotein, pseudokinase selenoprotein-O(SelO), that is localized to the mitochondria. It is the largest mammalian selenoprotein, containing the rare amino acid selenocysteine (Sec). Sec is encoded by the UGA codon, which normally signals translation termination. The 3' UTRs of selenoprotein mRNAs contain a conserved stem-loop structure, designated the Sec insertion sequence (SECIS) element, that is necessary for the recognition of UGA as a Sec codon, rather than as a stop signal. The SELO protein AMPylates proteins involved in redox homeostasis. As a result this selenoprotein is thought to be necessary for the cellular response to oxidative stress.
