= Selenoprotein T =

Protein found in humans

SELENOT

Identifiers
- Aliases: SELENOT, SELT, selenoprotein T
- External IDs: OMIM: 607912; MGI: 1916477; GeneCards: SELENOT
Enzyme activity
| EC # | BRENDA | ExPASy | KEGG | MetaCyc |
|---|---|---|---|---|
| 1.8.1.9 | ↗ | ↗ | ↗ | ↗ |

Gene location (Human)
| Chr. | Chromosome 3 (human) |
| Band | 3q25.1 | Start | 150,602,875 bp |
| Band | 3q25.1 | End | 150,630,436 bp |

Gene location (Mouse)
| Chr. | Chromosome 3 (mouse) |
| Band | 3|3 D | Start | 58,484,057 bp |
| Band | 3|3 D | End | 58,500,554 bp |
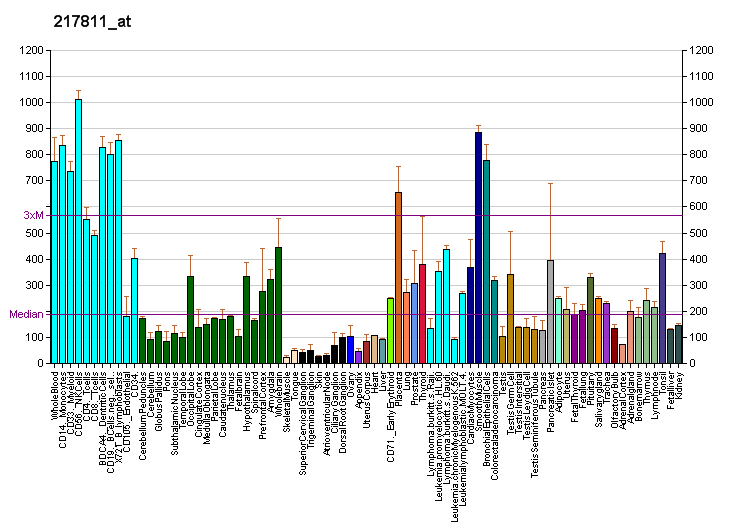
RNA expression pattern
| Bgee | Human / Mouse (ortholog); Top expressed in: islet of Langerhans; right adrenal gland; right adrenal cortex; internal globus pallidus; left adrenal gland; monocyte; beta cell; stromal cell of endometrium; left adrenal cortex; prefrontal cortex / Top expressed in: olfactory epithelium; iris; median eminence; sciatic nerve; primitive streak; Epithelium of choroid plexus; barrel cortex; Region I of hippocampus proper; vestibular membrane of cochlear duct; endothelial cell of lymphatic vessel; More reference expression data |
| BioGPS | More reference expression data |
Gene ontology
| Molecular function | selenium binding; thioredoxin-disulfide reductase activity; oxidoreductase activity |
| Cellular component | endoplasmic reticulum; endoplasmic reticulum membrane; membrane; integral component of membrane |
| Biological process | selenocysteine incorporation; positive regulation of cytosolic calcium ion concentration; positive regulation of growth hormone secretion; cellular oxidant detoxification; response to glucose; pancreas development; insulin secretion involved in cellular response to glucose stimulus; glucose homeostasis; cell redox homeostasis |
Sources:Amigo / QuickGO
Orthologs
| Databases | NCBI: entry; OMA: entry |
| Species | Human | Mouse |
| Entrez | 51714 | 69227 |
| Ensembl | ENSG00000198843 | ENSMUSG00000075700 |
| UniProt | P62341 | P62342 |
| RefSeq (mRNA) | NM_016275 | NM_001040396; NM_026997 |
| RefSeq (protein) | NP_057359 | NP_001035486 |
| Location (UCSC) | Chr 3: 150.6 – 150.63 Mb | Chr 3: 58.48 – 58.5 Mb |
| PubMed search |
- Wikidata
| View/Edit Human | View/Edit Mouse |

Selenoprotein T, is a protein that in humans is encoded by the SELENOT gene (previously SELT).

== Gene ==
The selenocysteine is encoded by the UGA codon that normally signals translation termination. The 3' UTR of selenoprotein genes have a common stem-loop structure, the sec insertion sequence (SECIS), that is necessary for the recognition of UGA as a Sec codon rather than as a stop signal.

== Protein structure ==
Selenoprotein T contains a selenocysteine (Sec) residue at its active site.

== See also ==
- selenoprotein
