= HUPRA syndrome =

Human disease

- Other names: Hyperuricemia-pulmonary hypertension-renal failure-alkalosis syndrome
- HUPRA syndrome is inherited via autosomal recessive manner
- Frequency: Less than one in a million

HUPRA syndrome is a rare syndrome that was first described in 2010 in two infants of Palestinian origin from the same village in the Jerusalem area. The parents of one of the two infants were related. It was later described in a third infant from the same village, whose parents were not related.

The acronym stands for Hyperuricemia, Pulmonary hypertension, Renal failure in infancy and Alkalosis. The condition is caused by mutations in the mitochondrial SARS enzyme. It is an autosomal recessive disease with a prevalence of less than one in a million. One in fifteen of the village's inhabitants were found to carry the genetic mutation.

== Presentation ==
Those affected were born prematurely, and suffered from feeding difficulties and developmental delays. They presented with progressive kidney disease and primary pulmonary hypertension, and ultimately died.

== Genetics ==
The cause of this condition is a mutation in the SARS2 gene (seryl-tRNA synthetase enzyme) which has to do with protein translation. Furthermore, the HUPRA syndrome is autosomal recessive in its inheritance pattern. It is located on chromosome 19 (19q13.2).

== Treatment ==
Currently there is no curative treatment.

== See also ==
- Mitochondrial disease
- Mitochondrial DNA
