= Mitochondrial peptide methionine sulfoxide reductase =

Protein-coding gene in the species Homo sapiens

MSRA

Identifiers
- Aliases: MSRA, PMSR, methionine sulfoxide reductase A
- External IDs: OMIM: 601250; MGI: 106916; GeneCards: MSRA
Available structures
PDB	Ortholog search: PDBe RCSB
PDB	List of PDB id codes 2L90
Enzyme activity
EC #	BRENDA	ExPASy	KEGG	MetaCyc
1.8.4.11	↗	↗	↗	↗

Gene location (Human)
Chr.	Chromosome 8 (human)
Band	8p23.1	Start	10,054,292 bp
Band	8p23.1	End	10,428,891 bp

Gene location (Mouse)
Chr.	Chromosome 14 (mouse)
Band	14 D1|14 33.36 cM	Start	64,360,074 bp
Band	14 D1|14 33.36 cM	End	64,693,352 bp
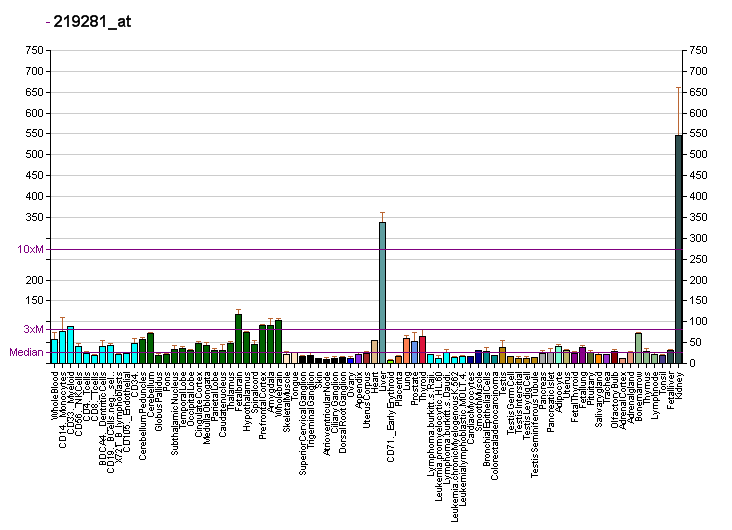
RNA expression pattern
Bgee	Human / Mouse (ortholog); Top expressed in: right lobe of liver; cerebellar cortex; cerebellar hemisphere; human kidney; right hemisphere of cerebellum; bone marrow; apex of heart; bone marrow cell; blood; corpus callosum / Top expressed in: right kidney; granulocyte; interventricular septum; human kidney; left lobe of liver; proximal tubule; right ventricle; duodenum; dentate gyrus of hippocampal formation granule cell; brown adipose tissue; More reference expression data
BioGPS	More reference expression data
Gene ontology
Molecular function	oxidoreductase activity; peptide-methionine (S)-S-oxide reductase activity; L-methionine-(S)-S-oxide reductase activity
Cellular component	extracellular exosome; nucleus; membrane; nucleoplasm; actin cytoskeleton; mitochondrion; cytoplasm; cytosol
Biological process	methionine metabolic process; response to oxidative stress; protein repair; cellular response to oxidative stress
Sources:Amigo / QuickGO
Orthologs
Databases	NCBI: entry; OMA: entry
Species	Human	Mouse
Entrez	4482	110265
Ensembl	ENSG00000175806; ENSG00000285250	ENSMUSG00000054733
UniProt	Q9UJ68	Q9D6Y7
RefSeq (mRNA)	NM_001135670; NM_001135671; NM_001199729; NM_012331	NM_001253712; NM_001253714; NM_001253715; NM_001253716; NM_026322 NM_001347639
RefSeq (protein)	NP_001129142; NP_001129143; NP_001186658; NP_036463	NP_001240641; NP_001240643; NP_001240644; NP_001240645; NP_001334568 NP_080598
Location (UCSC)	Chr 8: 10.05 – 10.43 Mb	Chr 14: 64.36 – 64.69 Mb
PubMed search
- Wikidata
View/Edit Human	View/Edit Mouse

Mitochondrial peptide methionine sulfoxide reductase, also known as methionine sulfoxide reductase A, is an enzyme that in humans is encoded by the MSRA gene. MRSA is a member of the methionine sulfoxide reductase (Msr) family of enzymes.

== Function ==
Msr is ubiquitous and highly conserved. Human and animal studies have shown the highest levels of expression in kidney and liver. It carries out the enzymatic reduction of methionine sulfoxide (MetO), the oxidized form of the amino acid methionine (Met), back to methionine, using thioredoxin to catalyze the enzymatic reduction and repair of oxidized methionine residues. Its proposed function is thus the repair of oxidative damage to proteins to restore biological activity. Oxidation of methionine residues in tissue proteins can cause them to misfold or otherwise render them dysfunctional.

== Clinical significance ==
MetO increases with age in body tissues, which is believed by some to contribute to biological ageing. Moreover, levels of methionine sulfoxide reductase A (MsrA) decline in aging tissues in mice and in association with age-related disease in humans. There is thus a rationale for thinking that by maintaining the structureincreased levels or activity of MsrA might retard the rate of aging.

Indeed, transgenic Drosophila (fruit flies) that overexpress methionine sulfoxide reductase show extended lifespan. However, the effects of MsrA overexpression in mice were ambiguous. MsrA is found in both the cytosol and the energy-producing mitochondria, where most of the body's endogenous free radicals are produced. Transgenically increasing the levels of MsrA in either the cytosol or the mitochondria had no significant effect on lifespan assessed by most standard statistical tests, and may possibly have led to early deaths in the cytosol-specific mice, although the survival curves appeared to suggest a slight increase in maximum (90%) survivorship, as did analysis using Boschloo's test, a binomial test designed to test greater extreme variation.

Deletion of this gene has been associated with insulin resistance in mice, while overexpression reduces insulin resistance in old mice.

== See also ==
- MSRB2
- Methionine oxidation
- SEPX1
