= C3H7NO3 =

The molecular formula C_{3}H_{7}NO_{3} (molar mass: 105.09 g/mol, exact mass: 105.0426 u) may refer to:

- Isopropyl nitrate (IPN)
- Isoserine
- Serine
