= Selenocysteine lyase =

selenocysteine lyase

Identifiers
- EC no.: 4.4.1.16
- CAS no.: 82047-76-5

Databases
- IntEnz: IntEnz view
- BRENDA: BRENDA entry
- ExPASy: NiceZyme view
- KEGG: KEGG entry
- MetaCyc: metabolic pathway
- PRIAM: profile
- PDB structures: RCSB PDB PDBe PDBsum
- Gene Ontology: AmiGO / QuickGO
Search
- PMC: articles
- PubMed: articles
- NCBI: proteins

The enzyme selenocysteine lyase (SCL) (EC 4.4.1.16) catalyzes the chemical reaction

L-selenocysteine + reduced acceptor $\rightleftharpoons$ selenide + L-alanine + acceptor

== Nomenclature ==
This enzyme belongs to the family of lyases, specifically the class of carbon-sulfur lyases. The systematic name of this enzyme class is L-selenocysteine selenide-lyase (L-alanine-forming). Other names in common use include selenocysteine reductase, and selenocysteine β-lyase.

== Function ==
This enzyme participates in selenoamino acid metabolism by recycling Se from selenocysteine during the degradation of selenoproteins, providing an alternate source of Se for selenocysteine biosynthesis.

== Structure and mechanism ==
Mammalian SCL forms a homodimer while bacterial SCL is monomeric. In mammals, highest SCL activity is found in the liver and kidney.

While selenocysteine lyases generally catalyze the removal of both selenium or sulfur from selenocysteine or cysteine, respectively, human selenocysteine lyases are specific for selenocysteine. Asp146 has been identified as the key residue that preserves specificity in human SCL.
