= Serine–tRNA ligase, mitochondrial =

Enzyme found in humans

SARS2

Identifiers
- Aliases: SARS2, SARS, SARSM, SERS, SYS, SerRS, SerRSmt, mtSerRS, seryl-tRNA synthetase 2, mitochondrial
- External IDs: OMIM: 612804; MGI: 1919234; GeneCards: SARS2
Enzyme activity
EC #	BRENDA	ExPASy	KEGG	MetaCyc
6.1.1.11	↗	↗	↗	↗

Gene location (Human)
Chr.	Chromosome 19 (human)
Band	19q13.2	Start	38,915,266 bp
Band	19q13.2	End	38,930,763 bp

Gene location (Mouse)
Chr.	Chromosome 7 (mouse)
Band	7 B1|7 16.91 cM	Start	28,441,417 bp
Band	7 B1|7 16.91 cM	End	28,453,296 bp
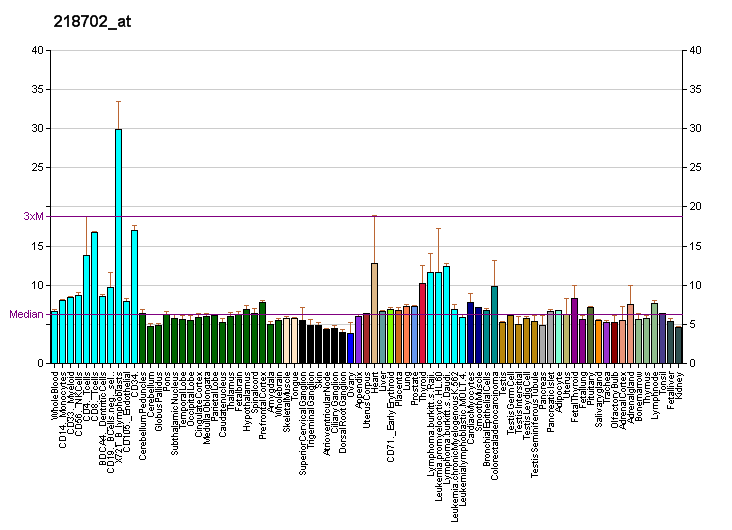
RNA expression pattern
Bgee	Human / Mouse (ortholog); Top expressed in: apex of heart; right lobe of thyroid gland; right adrenal cortex; left lobe of thyroid gland; right lobe of liver; mucosa of transverse colon; left adrenal gland; left adrenal cortex; pituitary gland; primary visual cortex / Top expressed in: epiblast; soleus muscle; Gonadal ridge; yolk sac; embryo; muscle of thigh; embryo; maxillary prominence; thoracic diaphragm; intercostal muscle; More reference expression data
BioGPS	More reference expression data
Gene ontology
Molecular function	aminoacyl-tRNA ligase activity; nucleotide binding; ligase activity; ATP binding; serine-tRNA ligase activity; RNA binding
Cellular component	cytoplasm; mitochondrial matrix; mitochondrion
Biological process	tRNA aminoacylation for protein translation; protein biosynthesis; seryl-tRNA aminoacylation; selenocysteinyl-tRNA(Sec) biosynthetic process
Sources:Amigo / QuickGO
Orthologs
Databases	NCBI: entry; OMA: entry
Species	Human	Mouse
Entrez	54938	71984
Ensembl	ENSG00000104835; ENSG00000283104	ENSMUSG00000070699
UniProt	Q9NP81	Q9JJL8
RefSeq (mRNA)	NM_017827; NM_001145901	NM_023637
RefSeq (protein)	NP_001139373; NP_060297	NP_076126
Location (UCSC)	Chr 19: 38.92 – 38.93 Mb	Chr 7: 28.44 – 28.45 Mb
PubMed search
- Wikidata
View/Edit Human	View/Edit Mouse

Serine–tRNA ligase, mitochondrial, also called seryl-tRNA synthetase 2, mitochondrial, is an enzyme that in humans is encoded by the SARS2 gene. Like serine–tRNA ligase, cytoplasmic (SARS1), this enzyme functions as a serine–tRNA ligase, which means it participates in RNA-to-protein translation by attaching the amino acid serine to the corresponding serine transfer RNA (tRNA^{Ser}).

== Medical significance ==
Pathogenic homozygous mutations in SARS2 are associated with symptoms including premature birth and infant onset kidney failure, called HUPRA syndrome (Hyperuricemia, pulmonary hypertension, renal failure, and alkalosis syndrome).

As with many mutations that affect protein translation, mutations in SARS2 have been shown to cause a collection of diseases, such as hyperuricemia, metabolic alkalosis, pulmonary hypertension, and progressive kidney failure in infancy; together, these conditions are known as HUPRA syndrome.

Some cases of missense mutations in SARS2 have been observed to result in a complete lack of acetylated seryl-tRNA synthetase and a severely reduced amount of non-acetylated enzyme. This results in the ineffective or complete inability of L-serine to be transferred to its cognate tRNA, resulting in incomplete protein translation and folding. The impacts appear to only reach a phenotypic pathology in certain high energy expenditure cells, such as renal cells and lung tissue. It has been suggested that the residual activity of the SARS2 gene allows most other tissues to avoid cytopathic symptoms, however, is unable to protect high-energy requirement cells from damage.

SARS2 mutations resulting in HUPRA syndrome are extremely rare, with less than 1 in 1,000,000 babies born with the condition. A Palestinian community in the Greater Jerusalem region appears to have a much higher incidence of the mutation, potentially due to a common ancestor.
