= Peptide-methionine (R)-S-oxide reductase =

Identifiers
- EC no.: 1.8.4.12

Databases
- BRENDA: enzyme data
- ExPASy: NiceZyme view
- KEGG: enzyme entry
- MetaCyc: metabolic pathway
- Rhea: reactions
- PDB structures: RCSB PDB PDBe PDBsum
Search
- PMC: articles
- PubMed: articles
- NCBI: proteins

In enzymology, a peptide-methionine (R)-S-oxide reductase (EC 1.8.4.12) is an enzyme that catalyzes the chemical reaction

peptide-L-methionine + thioredoxin disulfide + H_{2}O $\rightleftharpoons$ peptide-L-methionine (R)-S-oxide + thioredoxin

The 3 substrates of this enzyme are peptide-L-methionine, thioredoxin disulfide, and H_{2}O, whereas its two products are peptide-L-methionine (R)-S-oxide and thioredoxin.

There are three isozymes reported in humans, encoded by the genes MSRB1 (Selenoprotein X), MSRB2, and MSRB3. This enzyme belongs to the family of oxidoreductases, specifically those acting on a sulfur group of donors with a disulfide as acceptor. The systematic name of this enzyme class is peptide-methionine:thioredoxin-disulfide S-oxidoreductase [methionine (R)-S-oxide-forming]. Other names in common use include MsrB, methionine sulfoxide reductase (ambiguous), pMSR, methionine S-oxide reductase (ambiguous), methionine S-oxide reductase (R-form oxidizing), methionine sulfoxide reductase B, PilB, and pRMsr.
