= L-seryl-tRNA(Sec) kinase =

Enzyme found in humans

PSTK

Identifiers
- Aliases: PSTK, C10orf89, phosphoseryl-tRNA kinase
- External IDs: OMIM: 611310; MGI: 2685945; GeneCards: PSTK
Enzyme activity
EC #	BRENDA	ExPASy	KEGG	MetaCyc
2.7.1.164	↗	↗	↗	↗

Gene location (Human)
Chr.	Chromosome 10 (human)
Band	10q26.13	Start	122,954,381 bp
Band	10q26.13	End	122,997,513 bp

Gene location (Mouse)
Chr.	Chromosome 7 (mouse)
Band	7|7 F3	Start	130,972,870 bp
Band	7|7 F3	End	130,996,211 bp
RNA expression pattern
Bgee	Human / Mouse (ortholog); Top expressed in: testicle; gonad; C1 segment; Brodmann area 9; prefrontal cortex; right frontal lobe; cingulate gyrus; anterior cingulate cortex; caudate nucleus; hypothalamus / Top expressed in: muscle of thigh; interventricular septum; spermatid; skeletal muscle tissue; yolk sac; endocardial cushion; extraocular muscle; embryo; plantaris muscle; neural layer of retina; More reference expression data
BioGPS	n/a
Gene ontology
Molecular function	kinase activity; transferase activity; tRNA binding; nucleotide binding; ATP binding
Cellular component	mitochondrion
Biological process	selenocysteinyl-tRNA(Sec) biosynthetic process; selenocysteine incorporation; protein biosynthesis; phosphorylation
Sources:Amigo / QuickGO
Orthologs
Databases	NCBI: entry; OMA: entry
Species	Human	Mouse
Entrez	118672	214580
Ensembl	ENSG00000179988	ENSMUSG00000063179
UniProt	Q8IV42	Q8BP74
RefSeq (mRNA)	NM_153336; NM_001363531	NM_001039534; NM_177609; NM_001364161
RefSeq (protein)	NP_699167; NP_001350460	NP_001034623; NP_001351090
Location (UCSC)	Chr 10: 122.95 – 123 Mb	Chr 7: 130.97 – 131 Mb
PubMed search
- Wikidata
View/Edit Human	View/Edit Mouse

O-phosphoseryl-tRNASec kinase

Identifiers
- EC no.: 2.7.1.164
- CAS no.: 91273-83-5

Databases
- BRENDA: enzyme data
- ExPASy: NiceZyme view
- KEGG: enzyme entry
- MetaCyc: metabolic pathway
- Rhea: reactions
- PDB structures: RCSB PDB PDBe PDBsum
Search
- PMC: articles
- PubMed: articles
- NCBI: proteins

L-seryl-tRNA(Sec) kinase, also called O-phosphoseryl-tRNA^{Sec} kinase (EC 2.7.1.164), is an enzyme that in humans is encoded by the gene PSTK. This enzyme's systematic name is ATP:L-seryl-tRNA^{Sec} O-phosphotransferase, and it catalyses the following chemical reaction

ATP + L-seryl-tRNA^{Sec} $\rightleftharpoons$ ADP + O-phospho-L-seryl-tRNA^{Sec}

Which is part of the process of selenocysteine formation.

== Function ==
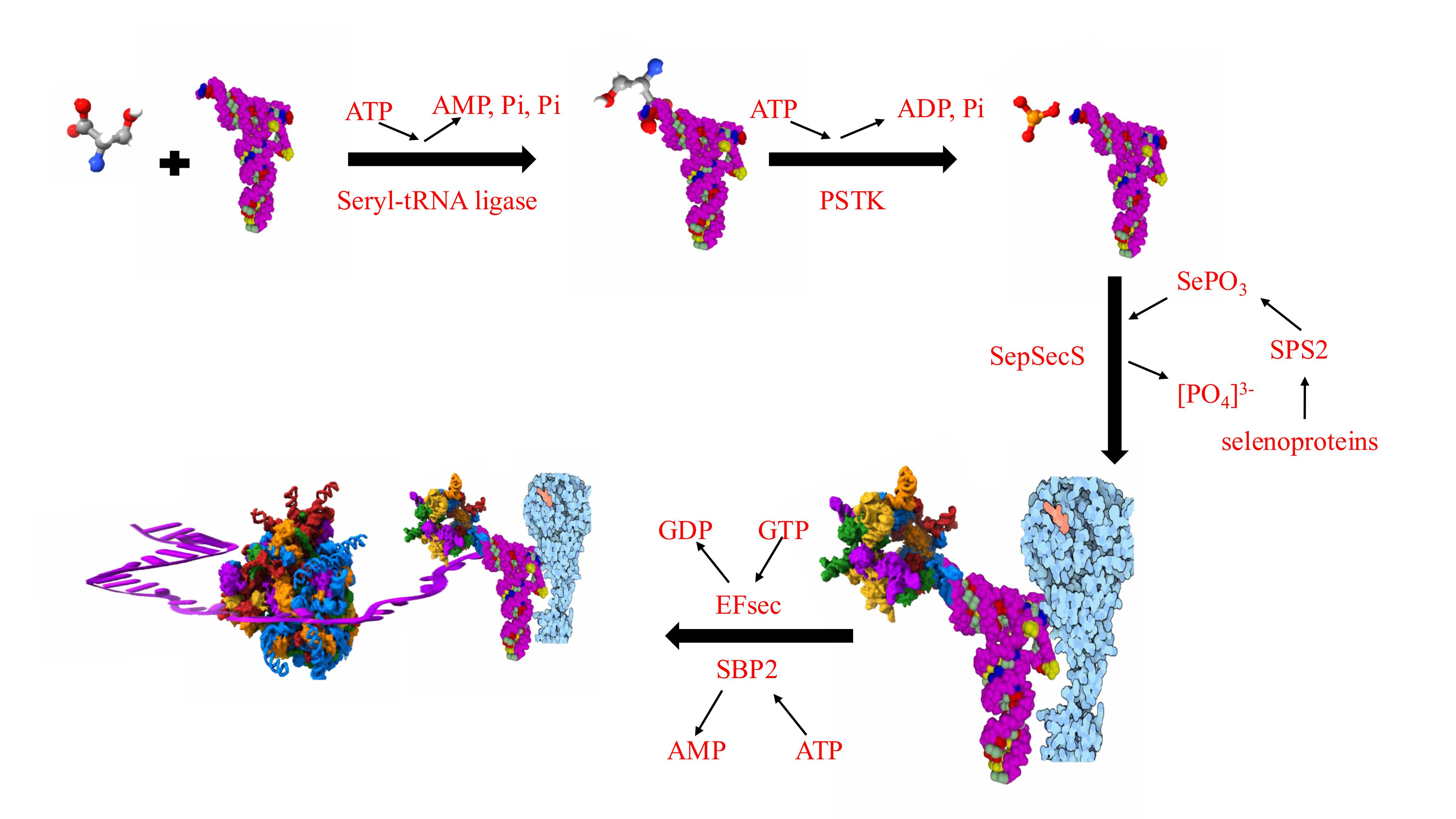
Selenocysteine synthesis pathway

In archaea and eukaryotes, selenocysteine formation is achieved by a two-step process. First this enzyme converts L-seryl-tRNA^{Sec} to O-phospho-L-seryl-tRNA^{Sec}, and then a second enzyme (O-phosphoseryl-tRNA(Sec) selenium transferase) converts it to the (properly charged) L-selenocysteinyl-tRNA^{Sec}.

== See also ==
- L-seryl-tRNA^{Sec} selenium transferase – a bacterial enzyme that acts on L-seryl-tRNA^{Sec}
