= Methionine sulfoxide =

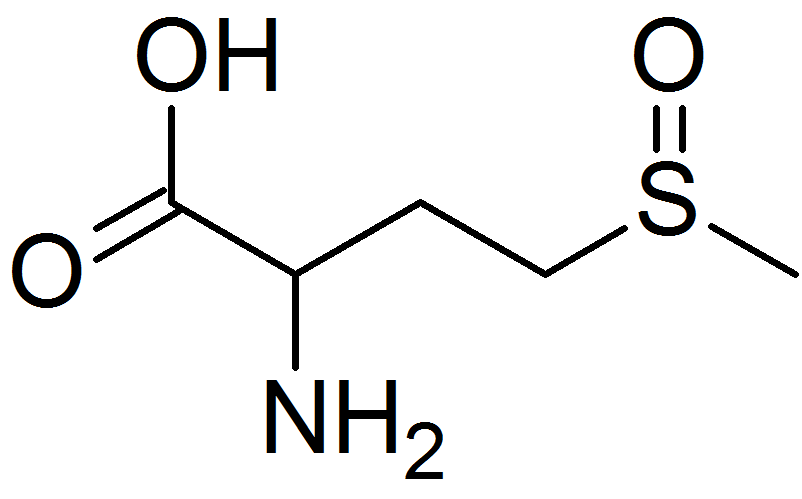

Names
- IUPAC name 2-Amino-4-(methylsulfinyl)butanoic acid

Identifiers
CAS Number	±: 62697-73-8
3D model (JSmol)	±: Interactive image
ChemSpider	±: 824
ECHA InfoCard	100.057.891
EC Number	±: 263-700-7
PubChem CID	±: 847
UNII	±: O74B4F6OYL
CompTox Dashboard (EPA)	±: DTXSID60866947
- InChI: InChI=1S/C5H11NO3S/c1-10(9)3-2-4(6)5(7)8/h4H,2-3,6H2,1H3,(H,7,8) Key: QEFRNWWLZKMPFJ-UHFFFAOYSA-N; ±: InChI=1/C5H11NO3S/c1-10(9)3-2-4(6)5(7)8/h4H,2-3,6H2,1H3,(H,7,8) Key: QEFRNWWLZKMPFJ-UHFFFAOYAN
- SMILES: ±: O=C(O)C(N)CCS(=O)C

Properties
Chemical formula	C_{5}H_{11}NO_{3}S
Molar mass	165.21 g·mol^{−1}
Appearance	white solid

Hazards
- GHS labelling
Pictograms	(GHS07: Exclamation mark)
Signal word	Warning
Hazard statements	H315, H319, H335
Precautionary statements	P261, P264, P271, P280, P302+P352, P304+P340, P305+P351+P338, P312, P321, P332+P313, P337+P313, P362, P403+P233, P405, P501
- Except where otherwise noted, data are given for materials in their standard state (at 25 °C [77 °F], 100 kPa). Infobox references

Methionine sulfoxide is the organic compound with the formula CH_{3}S(O)CH_{2}CH_{2}CH(NH_{2})CO_{2}H. It is an amino acid that occurs naturally although it is formed post-translationally.

Oxidation of the sulfur of methionine results in methionine sulfoxide or methionine sulfone. The sulfur-containing amino acids methionine and cysteine are more easily oxidized than the other amino acids. Unlike oxidation of other amino acids, the oxidation of methionine can be reversed by enzymatic action, specifically by enzymes in the methionine sulfoxide reductase family of enzymes. The three known methionine sulfoxide reductases are MsrA, MsrB, and fRmsr. Oxidation of methionine results in a mixture of the two diastereomers methionine-S-sulfoxide and methionine-R-sulfoxide, which are reduced by MsrA and MsrB, respectively. MsrA can reduce both free and protein-based methionine-S-sulfoxide, whereas MsrB is specific for protein-based methionine-R-sulfoxide. fRmsr, however, catalyzes the reduction of free methionine-R-sulfoxide. Thioredoxin serves to recycle by reduction some of the methionine sulfoxide reductase family of enzymes, whereas others can be reduced by metallothionein.

== Biochemical function ==
Methionine sulfoxide (MetO), the oxidized form of the amino acid methionine (Met), increases with age in body tissues, which is believed by some to contribute to biological ageing. Oxidation of methionine residues in tissue proteins can cause them to misfold or otherwise render them dysfunctional. Uniquely, the methionine sulfoxide reductase (Msr) group of enzymes act with thioredoxin to catalyze the enzymatic reduction and repair of oxidized methionine residues. Moreover, levels of methionine sulfoxide reductase A (MsrA) decline in aging tissues in mice and in association with age-related disease in humans. There is thus a rationale for thinking that by maintaining the structure, increased levels or activity of MsrA might retard the rate of aging.

Indeed, transgenic Drosophila (fruit flies) that overexpress methionine sulfoxide reductase show extended lifespan. However, the effects of MsrA overexpression in mice were ambiguous. MsrA is found in both the cytosol and the energy-producing mitochondria, where most of the body's endogenous free radicals are produced. Transgenically increasing the levels of MsrA in either the cytosol or the mitochondria had no significant effect on lifespan assessed by most standard statistical tests, and may possibly have led to early deaths in the cytosol-specific mice, although the survival curves appeared to suggest a slight increase in maximum (90%) survivorship, as did analysis using Boschloo's Exact test, a binomial test designed to test greater extreme variation.

The oxidation of methionine serves as a switch that deactivates certain protein activities such as E.coli ribosomal protein, L12. Proteins with great amount of methionine residues tend to exist within the lipid bilayer as methionine is one of the most hydrophobic amino acids. Those methionine residues that are exposed to the aqueous exterior thus are vulnerable to oxidation. The oxidized residues tend to be arrayed around the active site and may guard access to this site by reactive oxygen species. Once oxidized, the MetO residues are reduced back to methionine by the enzyme methionine sulfoxide reductase. Thus, an oxidation–reduction cycle occurs in which exposed methionine residues are oxidized (e.g., by H_{2}O_{2}) to methionine sulfoxide residues, which are subsequently reduced.

Methionine(protein)+ H_{2}O_{2}→ Methionine Sulfoxide(protein)+ H_{2}O

Methionine Sulfoxide(protein)+ NADPH+H^{+}→ Methionine(protein)+ NADP^{+}+H_{2}O

== See also ==
- MSRA (gene)
- MSRB2 enzyme
- SEPX1 enzyme
