= SepSecS =

Enzyme found in humans

SEPSECS

Identifiers
- Aliases: SEPSECS, LP, PCH2D, SLA, SLA/LP, Sep (O-phosphoserine) tRNA:Sec (selenocysteine) tRNA synthase, soluble liver antigen, SecS
- External IDs: OMIM: 613009; MGI: 1098791; GeneCards: SEPSECS
Available structures
PDB	Ortholog search: PDBe RCSB
PDB	List of PDB id codes 3HL2, 4ZDO, 4ZDL, 4ZDP
Enzyme activity
EC #	BRENDA	ExPASy	KEGG	MetaCyc
2.9.1.2	↗	↗	↗	↗

Gene location (Human)
Chr.	Chromosome 4 (human)
Band	4p15.2	Start	25,120,014 bp
Band	4p15.2	End	25,160,550 bp

Gene location (Mouse)
Chr.	Chromosome 5 (mouse)
Band	5 C1|5 28.44 cM	Start	52,797,429 bp
Band	5 C1|5 28.44 cM	End	52,827,050 bp
RNA expression pattern
Bgee	Human / Mouse (ortholog); Top expressed in: mucosa of ileum; testicle; right lobe of liver; jejunal mucosa; gonad; Achilles tendon; body of pancreas; pancreatic epithelial cell; rectum; gastric mucosa / Top expressed in: muscle of thorax; islet of Langerhans; left lobe of liver; thyroid cartilage; spermatocyte; secondary oocyte; right kidney; renal pelvis; Ileal epithelium; zygote; More reference expression data
BioGPS	n/a
Gene ontology
Molecular function	transferase activity; tRNA binding; selenotransferase activity; catalytic activity; protein binding; RNA binding; phosphoseryl-selenocysteinyl-tRNA selenium transferase activity
Cellular component	cytoplasm; cytosol; nucleus
Biological process	selenocysteine incorporation; protein biosynthesis; selenocysteine metabolic process; selenocysteinyl-tRNA(Sec) biosynthetic process
Sources:Amigo / QuickGO
Orthologs
Databases	NCBI: entry; OMA: entry
Species	Human	Mouse
Entrez	51091	211006
Ensembl	ENSG00000109618	ENSMUSG00000029173
UniProt	Q9HD40	Q6P6M7
RefSeq (mRNA)	NM_001159728; NM_016955	NM_172490; NM_001363463
RefSeq (protein)	NP_058651	NP_766078; NP_001350392
Location (UCSC)	Chr 4: 25.12 – 25.16 Mb	Chr 5: 52.8 – 52.83 Mb
PubMed search
- Wikidata
View/Edit Human	View/Edit Mouse

O-phospho-L-seryl-tRNASec:L-selenocysteinyl-tRNA synthase
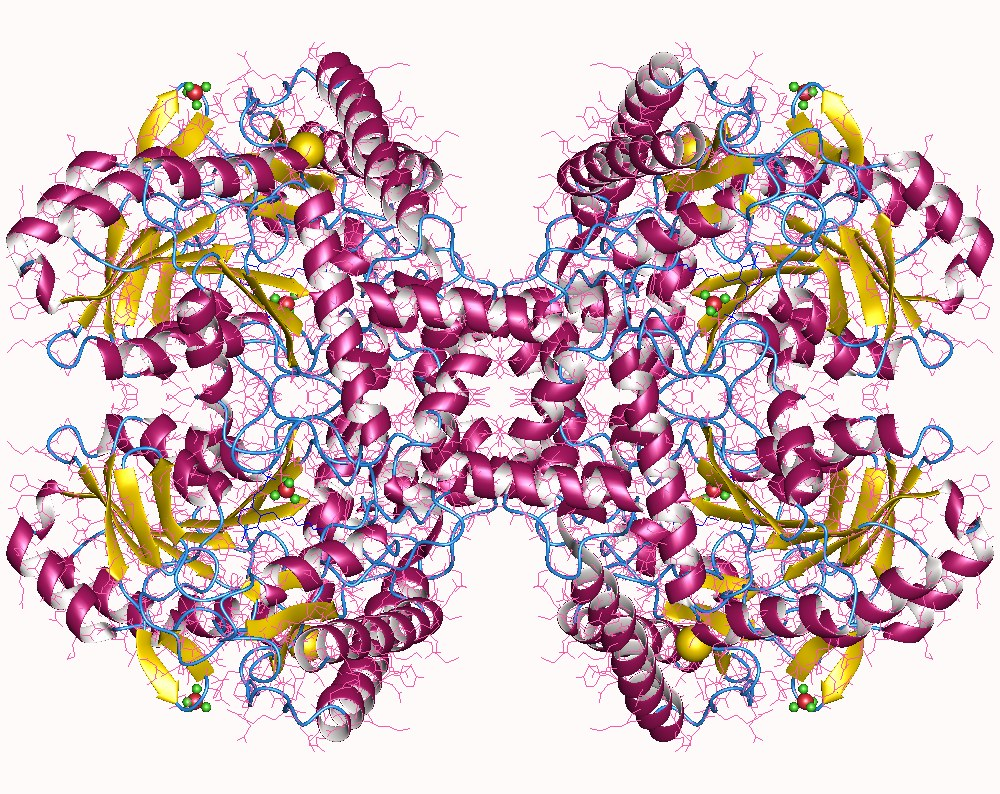
- Selenocysteine synthase tetramer, Mus musculus

Identifiers
- EC no.: 2.9.1.2

Databases
- BRENDA: enzyme data
- ExPASy: NiceZyme view
- KEGG: enzyme entry
- MetaCyc: metabolic pathway
- Rhea: reactions
- PDB structures: RCSB PDB PDBe PDBsum
Search
- PMC: articles
- PubMed: articles
- NCBI: proteins

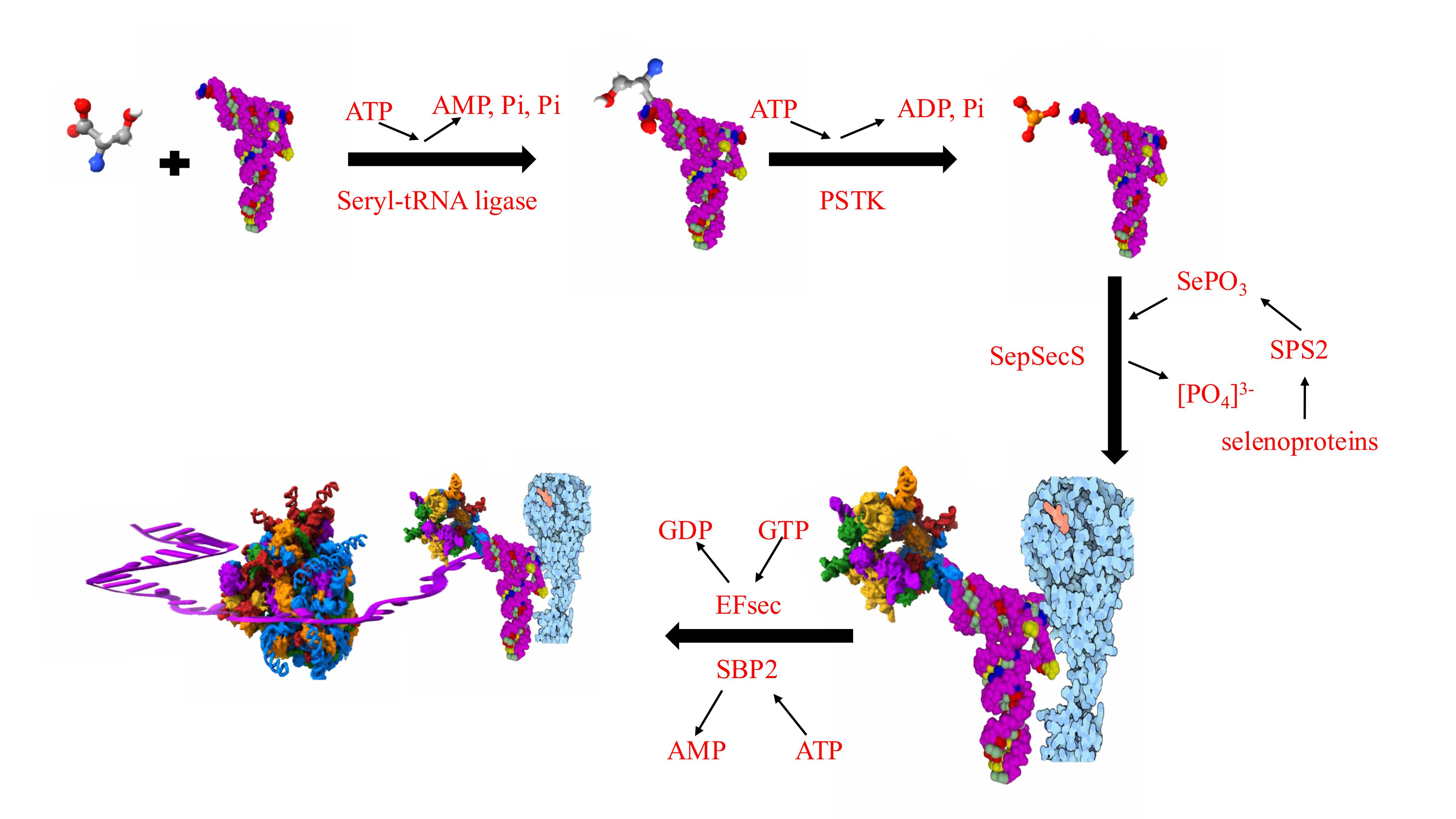
Selenocysteine synthesis pathway

O-phosphoseryl-tRNA(Sec) selenium transferase (or SepSecS) is an enzyme that in humans is encoded by the SEPSECS gene. This enzyme is part of the multi-step process of producing selenocysteinyl-tRNA^{Sec} which is needed for the synthesis of selenoproteins.

Also called O-phospho-L-seryl-tRNASec:L-selenocysteinyl-tRNA synthase (EC 2.9.1.2), this enzyme catalyses the following chemical reaction:

O-phospho-L-seryl-tRNA^{Sec} + selenophosphate ⇌ L-selenocysteinyl-tRNA^{Sec} + phosphate

using pyridoxal phosphate (PLP) as a cofactor.

== Other names ==
Other names for this enzyme include MMPSepSecS, SLA/LP, O-phosphoseryl-tRNA:selenocysteinyl-tRNA synthase, and O-phospho-L-seryl-tRNA:L-selenocysteinyl-tRNA synthase. The enzyme's systematic name is selenophosphate:O-phospho-L-seryl-tRNASec selenium transferase.

== Medical significance ==
Pathogenic mutations in SEPSECS have been associated with a small brain and skull size (microcephaly) and progressive brain atrophy, designated type 2D pontocerebellar hypoplasia (PCH2D). This is inherited in an autosomal recessive manner. Affected individuals were found to have reduced expression of selenoproteins in brain tissue, but not in other types of cells. In particular, it did not appear to consistently share the biochemical hallmark symptoms of low circulating selenoproteins and abnormal thyroid hormone levels found in selenoprotein deficiency caused by mutations in SECISBP2 or selenocysteine tRNA (TRU-TCA1-1).

== See also ==
- L-seryl-tRNA^{Sec} selenium transferase – a distinct selenocysteine producing enzyme found in bacteria
