= SECIS element =

RNA sequence directing the translation of UGA codons as selenocysteines

Selenocysteine insertion sequence 1
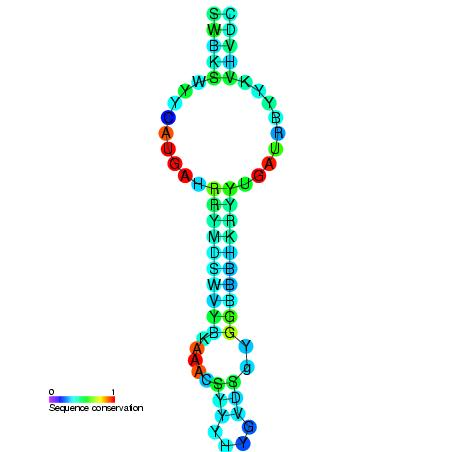
- Predicted secondary structure and sequence conservation of SECIS_1. Letters correspond to the IUPAC notation system for nucleotides.

Identifiers
- Symbol: SECIS_1
- Rfam: RF00031

Other data
- RNA type: Cis-reg
- Domain: Eukaryota
- GO: GO:0001514
- SO: SO:1001274
- PDB structures: PDBe

Selenocysteine insertion sequence 2

Identifiers
- Symbol: SECIS_2
- Rfam: RF01988

Other data
- Domain(s): Bacteria (seed), Eukaryota (hits)
- PDB structures: PDBe

Selenocysteine insertion sequence 3

Identifiers
- Symbol: SECIS_3
- Rfam: RF01989

Other data
- Domain(s): Bacteria (seed), Eukaryota (hits)
- PDB structures: PDBe

Selenocysteine insertion sequence 5

Identifiers
- Symbol: SECIS_4
- Rfam: RF01990

Other data
- Domain: Bacteria
- PDB structures: PDBe

Selenocysteine insertion sequence 5

Identifiers
- Symbol: SECIS_5
- Rfam: RF01991

Other data
- Domain: Eukaryota (only Plasmodium)
- PDB structures: PDBe

In biology, the SECIS element (SECIS: selenocysteine insertion sequence) is an RNA element around 60 nucleotides in length that adopts a stem-loop structure. This structural motif (pattern of nucleotides) directs the cell to translate UGA codons as selenocysteines (UGA is normally a stop codon). SECIS elements are thus a fundamental aspect of messenger RNAs encoding selenoproteins, proteins that include one or more selenocysteine residues.

== Location and function ==
In bacteria the SECIS element appears soon after the UGA codon it affects. In archaea and eukaryotes, it occurs in the 3' UTR of an mRNA, and can cause multiple UGA codons within the mRNA to code for selenocysteine. One archaeal SECIS element, in Methanococcus, is located in the 5' UTR. In any case, it serves to recruit EEFSEC or SelB, the specialized homolog of EF-Tu/eEF1&alpha, with the ability to read tRNA^{Sec}.

== Characteristics ==
The SECIS elements appear defined by sequence characteristics (particular nucleotides tend to be at particular positions in it), and a characteristic bent-hairpin secondary structure due to base-pairing of complementary RNA nucleotides. Although the eukaryotic, archaeal and bacterial SECIS elements each share a general hairpin structure, they are not alignable, e.g. an alignment-based scheme to recognize eukaryotic SECIS elements will not be able to recognize archaeal SECIS elements.

=== Bacterial SECIS ===
Bacterial SECIS is recognized by SelB. Each element targets one UGA codon. Rfam provides three separate groups of bacterial SECIS.

=== Eukaryotic SECIS ===
Eukaryotic SECIS elements are recognized by SBP2, which in turn binds EEFSEC to provide for elongation. In most cases the "kink-turn" part bound to SBP2 has a very conserved sequence "AUGA", but "GGGA" has also been found. 60S ribosomal protein L30 also recognizes SECIS, though its role is less well-understood.

The eukaryotic SECIS element consists of a small stem, a "kink-turn" core with AUGA/GGGA, another stem, and a terminal loop of 5-30 nt. In "Group II" SECIS elements the terminal loop is interrupted by a stem. The eukaryotic SECIS element includes wobble A-G base pairs, which are uncommon in nature, but are critically important for correct SECIS element function.

Rfam provides two groups of eukaryotic SECIS. SECIS_1 is built from animal sequences. SECIS_5 is built from Plasmodium sequences.

=== Archaeal SECIS ===
It is unclear which piece of the archaeal translation machinery is responsible for recognizing SECIS. They have a version of SelB/EEFSEC, but it has neither the bacterial SECIS-recognizing expansion nor the eukaryotic RBP2-recognizing expansion.

Archaeal SECIS consists of a "base" stem ending in GC-rich pairs, a conserved bulge region, a small (3bp) GC-rich stem, and a terminal AT-rich loop of 3-8 nt.

Lokiarcheota, a group of archaea believed to be related to the archaeal ancestor of eukaryotes, use eukaryotic-like kink-turn "AUGA" SECIS elements with no conserved bulge on a few families of selenoproteins. This type is believed to have evolved from the SECIS element from archaeal VhuD proteins, which also has a "AUGA" part but is not predicted to form a kink-turn. Lokiarcheota have no identified version of SBP2, but they do have L30.

== Detection in bioinformatics ==
=== From known SECIS elements ===
SECIS elements can be found using the sequence and secondary structure characteristics of groups of known SECIS elements. Methods are open-source unless specifically noted.

- The ERPIN program for RNA motif search was used to find new SECIS elements in animals, resulting in the identification of novel families of selenoproteins.
- Rfam provides five pre-built profiles for the Infernal RNA covariance search program as well as matches in GenBank sequences.
- SECISearch3 is broadly applicable to eukaryotes. It starts by finding candidates using three existing methods, Infernal, Covels, and SECISearch. It then merges the candidates, refines their structures, and filters the structures for hard-coded constraints. Both SECISearch3 and SECISearch are closed source and accessible through web services only. SECISearch3 is the best method for eukaryotes as of 2020. The identification of SECIS elements remains difficult in eukaryotes, especially non-animal ones.
- bSECISearch uses a RNAfold-based method similar to the original SECISearch to find bacterial SECIS. It is closed source and accessible through web services only.
- A version of SECISearch was adapted for the archaeal SCEIS consensus. This version is neither available as a download nor as an online service.

New families of selenoproteins have been found by searching for SECIS elements and checking the associated protein-coding region for UGA.

=== From known selenoproteins ===
New types of SECIS elements have been found by searching for protein-coding regions homologous to known selenoproteins, then checking the 3' UTR for secondary structure.

- An unusual "GGGA" type of SECIS element was found in Toxoplasma and Neospora for their version of selenoprotein T.

== Species distribution ==
The SECIS element is found in a wide variety of organisms from all three domains of life (including their viruses).
