= Methionine sulfone =

Names
- IUPAC name S,S-dioxo-L-methionine

Identifiers
| CAS Number | ±: 820-10-0 racemic; L: 7314-32-1 L enantiomer; D: 41486-92-4 D |
| 3D model (JSmol) | ±: Interactive image |
| ChEBI | L: CHEBI:21363 |
| ChEMBL | L: ChEMBL442720 |
| ChemSpider | L: 392966 |
| DrugBank | L: DB03790 |
| ECHA InfoCard | 100.027.976 |
| EC Number | L: 230-774-7 |
| PubChem CID | L: 445282 |
| UNII | L: V3Z9QH81BX |
| CompTox Dashboard (EPA) | ±: DTXSID301350027 |
- InChI: InChI=1S/C5H11NO4S/c1-11(9,10)3-2-4(6)5(7)8/h4H,2-3,6H2,1H3,(H,7,8)/t4-/m0/s1 Key: UCUNFLYVYCGDHP-BYPYZUCNSA-N; L: InChI=1S/C5H11NO4S/c1-11(9,10)3-2-4(6)5(7)8/h4H,2-3,6H2,1H3,(H,7,8)/t4-/m0/s1 Key: UCUNFLYVYCGDHP-BYPYZUCNSA-N
- SMILES: ±: CS(=O)(=O)CC[C@@H](C(=O)O)N

Properties
| Chemical formula | C_{5}H_{11}NO_{4}S |
| Molar mass | 181.21 g·mol^{−1} |
| Appearance | white solid |
| Melting point | 250–251 °C (482–484 °F; 523–524 K) single enantiomer |
- Except where otherwise noted, data are given for materials in their standard state (at 25 °C [77 °F], 100 kPa). Infobox references

Methionine sulfone is the organic compound with the formula CH_{3}SO_{2}CH_{2}CH_{2}CH(NH_{2})CO_{2}H. Although it is an amino acid that occurs naturally, it is formed post-translationally, arising by the double oxidation of methionine via the intermediate methionine sulfoxide. The methionine sulfone residue is found in the enzyme catalase of the bacterium Proteus mirabilis.
