= Rigid spine syndrome =

Neuromuscular disorder

Rigid spine syndrome, also known as congenital muscular dystrophy with rigidity of the spine (CMARS), is a rare and often debilitating neuromuscular disorder. It is characterized by progressive muscle stiffness and rigidity, particularly in the spine, which can severely limit mobility and impact quality of life. This condition is typically present from birth or early childhood and tends to worsen over time.

Despite its rarity, rigid spine syndrome represents a significant challenge for those affected, as well as for their families and healthcare providers.

== Signs and symptoms ==
Rigid spine syndrome is characterized by a range of symptoms that can vary in severity and presentation. Common symptoms of the condition include:

=== Muscle stiffness and rigidity ===
Individuals with rigid spine syndrome often experience tightness and inflexibility in their muscles, particularly in the spine. This rigidity can make movement difficult and may progress over time.

=== Spinal deformities ===
One of the hallmark features of rigid spine syndrome is the development of spinal deformities, such as kyphosis (forward curvature of the spine) and scoliosis (sideways curvature of the spine). These deformities can cause pain and further restrict movement.

=== Joint contractures ===
Contractures, or permanent tightening of the muscles and tendons around a joint, are common in rigid spine syndrome. This can lead to reduced range of motion and joint deformities.

=== Muscle weakness ===
While muscle stiffness is a primary symptom, individuals with rigid spine syndrome may also experience muscle weakness, particularly in the limbs.

=== Respiratory complications ===
In severe cases, rigid spine syndrome can lead to respiratory complications due to the restriction of chest movement caused by spinal deformities and muscle rigidity.

=== Difficulty walking ===
The combination of muscle stiffness, joint contractures, and spinal deformities can make walking and other forms of mobility challenging for individuals with rigid spine syndrome.

=== Other symptoms ===
Depending on the severity of the condition, individuals with rigid spine syndrome may also experience fatigue, pain, and difficulty with activities of daily living.

== Causing factors ==
Rigid spine syndrome is a genetic disorder, primarily caused by mutations in the gene SELENON (previously called SEPN1). This gene provides instructions for making a protein called selenoprotein N, which plays a role in muscle function and development. Mutations in the SELENON gene can lead to abnormal muscle stiffness and rigidity, as well as other characteristic features of rigid spine syndrome.

The inheritance pattern of rigid spine syndrome is autosomal recessive, which means that an individual must inherit two copies of the mutated gene (one from each parent) to develop the condition. Individuals who inherit only one copy of the mutated gene are known as carriers and typically do not show any symptoms of the condition.

In addition to mutations in the SELENON gene, other genetic and environmental factors may also play a role in the development of rigid spine syndrome. However, further research is needed to fully understand these factors and their contribution to the condition.

== Diagnosis ==
Diagnosing rigid spine syndrome can be challenging due to its rarity and the variability of symptoms among affected individuals. However, the following approaches are commonly used to diagnose the condition:

=== Clinical evaluation ===
A thorough physical examination is often the first step in diagnosing rigid spine syndrome. The healthcare provider will assess the patient's muscle tone, range of motion, and any signs of spinal deformities or joint contractures.

=== Imaging studies ===
X-rays, CT scans, or MRI scans may be used to evaluate the spine for any abnormalities, such as kyphosis, scoliosis, or other spinal deformities. These imaging studies can also help assess the severity of the condition and guide treatment planning.

=== Genetic testing ===
Genetic testing is essential for confirming a diagnosis of rigid spine syndrome. Testing typically involves analyzing the SELENON gene for mutations. Identifying mutations in this gene can help confirm the diagnosis and provide valuable information about the genetic basis of the condition.

=== Muscle biopsy ===
In some cases, a muscle biopsy may be recommended to evaluate the structure and function of the muscles. This can help differentiate rigid spine syndrome from other muscle disorders and provide additional information about the underlying cause of the condition.

=== Electromyography (EMG) ===
EMG may be used to assess the electrical activity of the muscles and nerves. This test can help identify abnormalities in muscle function and may be used to support a diagnosis of rigid spine syndrome.

=== Family history ===
A detailed family history can also be helpful in diagnosing rigid spine syndrome, as it is an autosomal recessive condition and often runs in families.

== Prognosis ==
The prognosis of rigid spine syndrome is variable and can be influenced by several factors, including the severity of symptoms, the age of onset, and the effectiveness of treatment. In general, the condition is progressive, meaning that symptoms tend to worsen over time. However, the rate of progression can vary widely among affected individuals.

=== Severity of symptoms ===
The severity of symptoms at the time of diagnosis can have a significant impact on prognosis. Individuals with milder symptoms may experience slower progression of the condition and better overall outcomes compared to those with more severe symptoms.

=== Age of onset ===
The age at which symptoms of rigid spine syndrome first appear can also influence prognosis. Early onset of symptoms, particularly in infancy or early childhood, is often associated with a more severe form of the condition and a poorer prognosis.

=== Effectiveness of treatment ===
The effectiveness of treatment in managing symptoms and complications of rigid spine syndrome can greatly impact prognosis. Early and aggressive management, including physical therapy, orthopedic interventions, and respiratory support, can help improve quality of life and slow disease progression.

=== Complications ===
The development of complications, such as respiratory problems or severe joint contractures, can also affect prognosis. Complications may require additional interventions and can further impact mobility and overall health.

=== Individual response to treatment ===
Each individual responds differently to treatment, and the effectiveness of various interventions can vary. Regular monitoring and adjustments to the treatment plan are essential to managing the condition and optimizing outcomes.

=== Quality of life ===
Despite the progressive nature of rigid spine syndrome, many individuals are able to maintain a good quality of life with appropriate care and support. Access to multidisciplinary care and assistive devices can greatly improve mobility and independence.

== Epidemiology ==
Rigid spine syndrome is a rare neuromuscular disorder, and accurate epidemiological data is limited. However, the condition appears to be extremely rare, with only a few dozen cases reported in medical literature.

=== Prevalence ===
The exact prevalence of rigid spine syndrome is unknown, but it is believed to be very low. The condition has been reported in various populations worldwide, suggesting that it is not limited to any specific ethnic or geographic group.

=== Incidence ===
Similarly, the incidence of rigid spine syndrome is not well-established due to its rarity. The condition is typically diagnosed in infancy or early childhood, but cases of adult onset have also been reported, albeit rarely.

=== Age and gender distribution ===
Rigid spine syndrome can affect individuals of any age or gender, but it is most commonly diagnosed in childhood. The condition does not appear to have a significant gender bias, affecting males and females equally.

=== Geographic distribution ===
Rigid spine syndrome has been reported in various countries around the world, indicating that it is not limited to any specific geographic region. However, due to its rarity, there may be underreporting in some areas.

=== Genetic factors ===
The autosomal recessive inheritance pattern of rigid spine syndrome suggests that individuals with a family history of the condition are at increased risk. Genetic counseling and testing can help identify carriers and inform family planning decisions.

== Research and future directions ==
Research on rigid spine syndrome is ongoing, with a focus on understanding the underlying genetic and molecular mechanisms of the condition, developing new treatment approaches, and improving the quality of life for affected individuals. Some key areas of research include:

=== Genetic studies ===
Researchers are conducting genetic studies to identify additional genes that may be involved in the development of rigid spine syndrome. This research may lead to a better understanding of the condition's genetic basis and the development of targeted therapies.

=== Molecular mechanisms ===
Studies are underway to investigate the molecular mechanisms underlying muscle stiffness and rigidity in rigid spine syndrome. This research may uncover new targets for therapeutic interventions aimed at improving muscle function.

=== Clinical trials ===
Clinical trials are being conducted to evaluate the safety and efficacy of potential treatments for rigid spine syndrome. These trials may involve medications, physical therapies, or surgical interventions aimed at improving mobility and quality of life for affected individuals.

=== Regenerative medicine ===
Some researchers are exploring the use of regenerative medicine approaches, such as stem cell therapy, to repair damaged muscles and improve muscle function in individuals with rigid spine syndrome. This area of research holds promise for future treatment options.

=== Patient registries ===
Patient registries are being established to collect data on individuals with rigid spine syndrome, including information on symptoms, disease progression, and treatment outcomes. These registries are valuable resources for researchers studying the condition.

=== Collaborative research efforts ===
Collaborative research efforts among healthcare providers, researchers, and patient advocacy groups are essential for advancing our understanding of rigid spine syndrome. These collaborations can help facilitate the sharing of data and resources, leading to more rapid progress in the field.

=== Future directions ===
Future research in rigid spine syndrome is likely to focus on personalized medicine approaches, aimed at tailoring treatments to the specific genetic and molecular characteristics of individual patients. Additionally, research may continue to explore the role of environmental factors in the development and progression of the condition.
