= Selenoprotein I =

Enzyme found in humans

SELENOI

Identifiers
- Aliases: SELENOI, SELI, SEPI, EPT1, ethanolaminephosphotransferase 1, selenoprotein I, SPG81
- External IDs: OMIM: 607915; MGI: 107898; GeneCards: SELENOI
Enzyme activity
EC #	BRENDA	ExPASy	KEGG	MetaCyc
2.7.8.1	↗	↗	↗	↗

Gene location (Human)
Chr.	Chromosome 2 (human)
Band	2p23.3	Start	26,308,547 bp
Band	2p23.3	End	26,395,885 bp

Gene location (Mouse)
Chr.	Chromosome 5 (mouse)
Band	5 B1|5 16.22 cM	Start	30,437,579 bp
Band	5 B1|5 16.22 cM	End	30,477,425 bp
RNA expression pattern
Bgee	Human / Mouse (ortholog); Top expressed in: mucosa of ileum; jejunal mucosa; tibialis anterior muscle; secondary oocyte; middle temporal gyrus; skin of arm; cerebellar vermis; islet of Langerhans; Achilles tendon; buccal mucosa cell / Top expressed in: superior cervical ganglion; epithelium of small intestine; spermatid; ileum; jejunum; spermatocyte; tail of embryo; cumulus cell; epithelium of stomach; hand; More reference expression data
BioGPS	n/a
Gene ontology
Molecular function	transferase activity; phosphotransferase activity, for other substituted phosphate groups; metal ion binding; ethanolaminephosphotransferase activity
Cellular component	integral component of membrane; endoplasmic reticulum membrane; membrane; Golgi apparatus
Biological process	phosphatidylethanolamine biosynthetic process; lipid metabolism; phospholipid biosynthetic process
Sources:Amigo / QuickGO
Orthologs
Databases	NCBI: entry; OMA: entry
Species	Human	Mouse
Entrez	85465	28042
Ensembl	ENSG00000138018	ENSMUSG00000075703
UniProt	Q9C0D9	Q80TA1
RefSeq (mRNA)	NM_033505	NM_027652
RefSeq (protein)	NP_277040	NP_081928
Location (UCSC)	Chr 2: 26.31 – 26.4 Mb	Chr 5: 30.44 – 30.48 Mb
PubMed search
- Wikidata
View/Edit Human	View/Edit Mouse

Selenoprotein I, also called ethanolaminephosphotransferase 1, is an enzyme that in humans is encoded by the SELENOI gene (previously EPT1). As an ethanolaminephosphotransferase, Selenoprotein I functions to transfer a phosphoethanolamine (PE) from a CDP-ethanolamine donor to a lipid acceptor. This enzyme is important for the synthesis of several types of PE, which are important components of cell membranes, and is particularly important for myelination and nervous system development.

== Medical Significance ==
Pathogenic mutations in SELENOI are associated with progressive dysfunction of the nervous system and muscle control. This condition, called spastic paraplegia-81 (SPG81), is inherited in an autosomal recessive manner.
