= Diacylglycerol ethanolaminephosphotransferase =

Class of enzymes

ethanolaminephosphotransferase

Identifiers
- EC no.: 2.7.8.1
- CAS no.: 9026-19-1

Databases
- BRENDA: enzyme data
- ExPASy: NiceZyme view
- KEGG: enzyme entry
- MetaCyc: metabolic pathway
- Rhea: reactions
- PDB structures: RCSB PDB PDBe PDBsum
- Gene Ontology: AmiGO / QuickGO
Search
- PMC: articles
- PubMed: articles
- NCBI: proteins

In enzymology, an ethanolaminephosphotransferase (EC 2.7.8.1) is an enzyme that catalyzes the chemical reaction

CDP-ethanolamine + 1,2-diacylglycerol $\rightleftharpoons$ CMP + a phosphatidylethanolamine

Thus, the two substrates of this enzyme are CDP-ethanolamine and 1,2-diacylglycerol, whereas its two products are CMP and phosphatidylethanolamine.

In humans, there are two reported isoforms, choline/ethanolaminephosphotransferase 1 encoded by the CEPT1 gene, and ethanolaminephosphotransferase 1 encoded by SELENOI. This enzyme belongs to the family of transferases, specifically those transferring non-standard substituted phosphate groups. The systematic name of this enzyme class is CDP-ethanolamine:1,2-diacylglycerol ethanolaminephosphotransferase. Other names in common use include EPT, diacylglycerol ethanolaminephosphotransferase, CDPethanolamine diglyceride phosphotransferase, and phosphorylethanolamine-glyceride transferase. This enzyme participates in 3 metabolic pathways: aminophosphonate metabolism, glycerophospholipid metabolism, and ether lipid metabolism.
