= Serine–tRNA ligase =

Class of enzymes

Identifiers
- EC no.: 6.1.1.11
- CAS no.: 9023-48-7

Databases
- BRENDA: enzyme data
- ExPASy: NiceZyme view
- KEGG: enzyme entry
- MetaCyc: metabolic pathway
- Rhea: reactions
- PDB structures: RCSB PDB PDBe PDBsum
- Gene Ontology: AmiGO / QuickGO
Search
- PMC: articles
- PubMed: articles
- NCBI: proteins

In enzymology, a serine–tRNA ligase (EC 6.1.1.11) is an enzyme that catalyzes the chemical reaction

ATP + L-serine + tRNA^{Ser} $\rightleftharpoons$ AMP + diphosphate + L-seryl-tRNA^{Ser}

The 3 substrates of this enzyme are ATP, L-serine, and tRNA^{Ser}, whereas its 3 products are AMP, diphosphate, and L-seryl-tRNA^{Ser}. In some organisms like humans, this enzyme can also attach serine onto selenocysteine tRNA, which is a step in the process of producing selenocysteine.

In humans, there are two isozymes: serine–tRNA ligase, cytoplasmic (SARS1) and serine–tRNA ligase, mitochondrial (SARS2).

This enzyme belongs to the family of ligases, to be specific those forming carbon–oxygen bonds in aminoacyl-tRNA and related compounds. The systematic name of this enzyme class is L-serine:tRNA^{Ser} ligase (AMP-forming). Other names in common use include seryl-tRNA synthetase, SerRS, seryl-transfer ribonucleate synthetase, seryl-transfer RNA synthetase, seryl-transfer ribonucleic acid synthetase, and serine translase. This enzyme participates in glycine, serine and threonine metabolism, and aminoacyl-tRNA biosynthesis.

== Structural studies ==
As of late 2007, 13 structures have been solved for this class of enzymes, with PDB accession codes PDB: 1SER, PDB: 1SES, PDB: 1SET, PDB: 1SRY, PDB: 1WLE, PDB: 2CIM, PDB: 2CJ9, PDB: 2CJA, PDB: 2CJB, PDB: 2DQ0, PDB: 2DQ1, PDB: 2DQ2, and PDB: 2DQ3.
