= MSRB2 =

Protein-coding gene in the species Homo sapiens

Identifiers
- Aliases: MSRB2, CBS-1, CBS1, MSRB, PILB, CGI-131, methionine sulfoxide reductase B2
- External IDs: OMIM: 613782; MGI: 1923717; GeneCards: MSRB2
Available structures
PDB	Ortholog search: PDBe RCSB
PDB	List of PDB id codes 2L1U
Enzyme activity
EC #	BRENDA	ExPASy	KEGG	MetaCyc
1.8.4.12	↗	↗	↗	↗
1.8.4.14	↗	↗	↗	↗

Gene location (Human)
Chr.	Chromosome 10 (human)
Band	10p12.2	Start	23,095,579 bp
Band	10p12.2	End	23,122,013 bp

Gene location (Mouse)
Chr.	Chromosome 2 (mouse)
Band	2|2 A3	Start	19,376,251 bp
Band	2|2 A3	End	19,399,787 bp
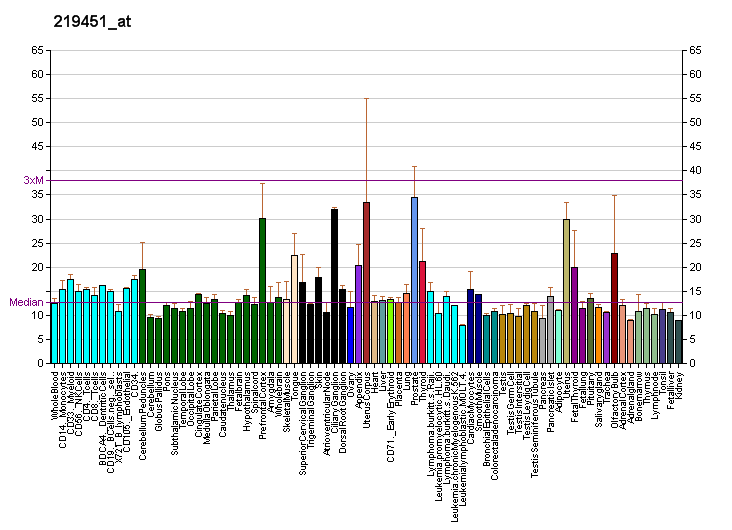

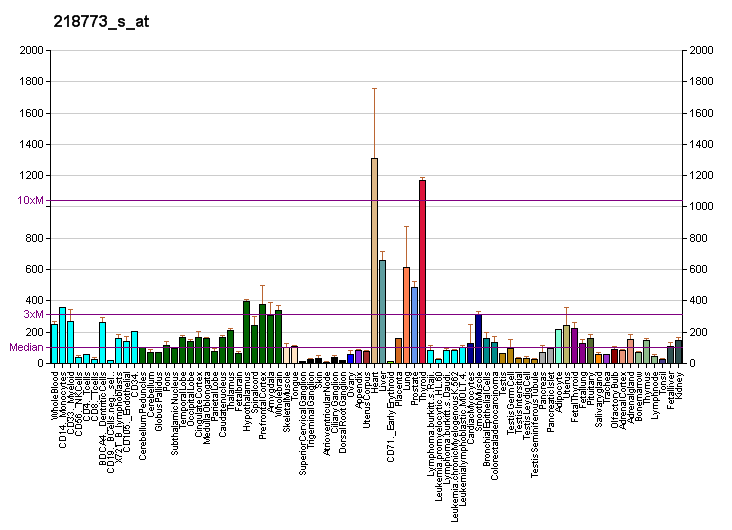
RNA expression pattern
Bgee	Human / Mouse (ortholog); Top expressed in: right ventricle; apex of heart; vena cava; left ventricle; right auricle of heart; Skeletal muscle tissue of rectus abdominis; muscle of arm; biceps brachii; triceps brachii muscle; Skeletal muscle tissue of biceps brachii / Top expressed in: interventricular septum; myocardium of ventricle; right kidney; cardiac muscles; granulocyte; right ventricle; lumbar spinal ganglion; proximal tubule; cervix; skeletal muscle tissue; More reference expression data
BioGPS	More reference expression data
Gene ontology
Molecular function	DNA-binding transcription factor activity; oxidoreductase activity, acting on a sulfur group of donors, disulfide as acceptor; oxidoreductase activity; actin binding; zinc ion binding; metal ion binding; peptide-methionine (R)-S-oxide reductase activity; L-methionine-(R)-S-oxide reductase activity
Cellular component	cytosol; mitochondrion
Biological process	actin filament polymerization; response to oxidative stress; protein repair; regulation of transcription, DNA-templated; cellular response to oxidative stress
Sources:Amigo / QuickGO
Orthologs
Databases	NCBI: entry; OMA: entry
Species	Human	Mouse
Entrez	22921	76467
Ensembl	ENSG00000148450	ENSMUSG00000023094
UniProt	Q9Y3D2	Q78J03
RefSeq (mRNA)	NM_012228	NM_029619
RefSeq (protein)	NP_036360	NP_083895
Location (UCSC)	Chr 10: 23.1 – 23.12 Mb	Chr 2: 19.38 – 19.4 Mb
PubMed search
- Wikidata
View/Edit Human	View/Edit Mouse

Methionine-R-sulfoxide reductase B2, mitochondrial is an enzyme that in humans is encoded by the MSRB2 gene. The MRSB2 enzyme catalyzes the reduction of methionine sulfoxide to methionine.

== See also ==
- MSRA (gene)
- Methionine oxidation
- SEPX1
