= SECISBP2 =

Protein-coding gene in the species Homo sapiens

Identifiers
- Aliases: SECISBP2, SBP2, SECIS binding protein 2
- External IDs: OMIM: 607693; MGI: 1922670; GeneCards: SECISBP2

Gene location (Human)
Chr.	Chromosome 9 (human)
Band	9q22.2	Start	89,318,500 bp
Band	9q22.2	End	89,359,663 bp

Gene location (Mouse)
Chr.	Chromosome 13 (mouse)
Band	13|13 A5	Start	51,805,733 bp
Band	13|13 A5	End	51,838,080 bp
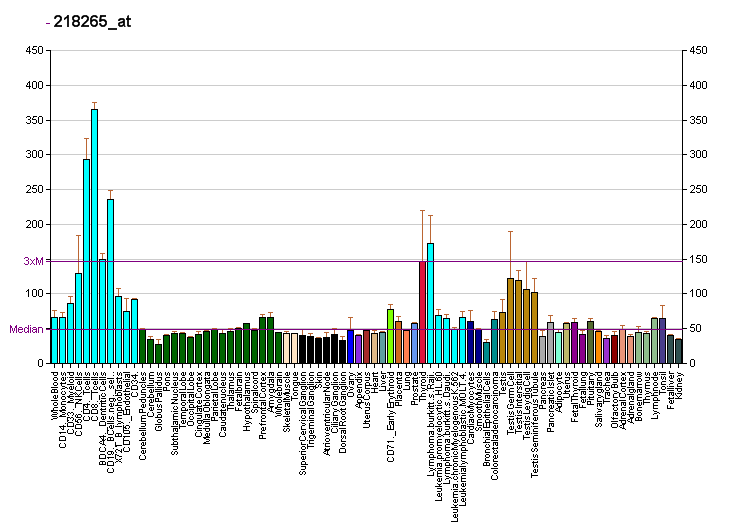
RNA expression pattern
Bgee	Human / Mouse (ortholog); Top expressed in: secondary oocyte; sperm; body of pancreas; left ovary; right uterine tube; right ovary; left testis; right testis; sural nerve; body of uterus / Top expressed in: hand; Rostral migratory stream; otolith organ; utricle; mesenteric lymph nodes; primitive streak; zygote; hair follicle; bone marrow; secondary oocyte; More reference expression data
BioGPS	More reference expression data
Gene ontology
Molecular function	mRNA 3'-UTR binding; protein binding; RNA binding; selenocysteine insertion sequence binding; ribonucleoprotein complex binding
Cellular component	nucleus; mitochondrion; ribonucleoprotein complex
Biological process	protein biosynthesis; striatum development; neuron development; negative regulation of nuclear-transcribed mRNA catabolic process, nonsense-mediated decay; selenocysteine incorporation
Sources:Amigo / QuickGO
Orthologs
Databases	NCBI: entry; OMA: entry
Species	Human	Mouse
Entrez	79048	75420
Ensembl	ENSG00000187742	ENSMUSG00000035139
UniProt	Q96T21	n/a
RefSeq (mRNA)	NM_001282688; NM_001282689; NM_001282690; NM_024077; NM_001354696 NM_001354697; NM_001354698; NM_001354702	NM_029279; NM_001308448
RefSeq (protein)	NP_001269617; NP_001269618; NP_001269619; NP_076982; NP_001341625 NP_001341626; NP_001341627; NP_001341631	n/a
Location (UCSC)	Chr 9: 89.32 – 89.36 Mb	Chr 13: 51.81 – 51.84 Mb
PubMed search
- Wikidata
View/Edit Human	View/Edit Mouse

SECIS-binding protein 2 (commonly referred to as SBP2) is a protein that in humans is encoded by the SECISBP2 gene.

== Function ==
The incorporation of selenocysteine into a protein requires the concerted action of an mRNA element called a sec insertion sequence (SECIS), a selenocysteine-specific translation elongation factor and a SECIS binding protein. With these elements in place, a UGA codon can be decoded as selenocysteine. SBP2 is a nuclear protein that functions as a SECIS binding protein, but experimental evidence indicates that SBP2 is cytoplasmic.

== Clinical significance ==
Mutations in this gene have been associated with a reduction in activity of a specific thyroxine deiodinase, a selenocysteine-containing enzyme, and abnormal thyroid hormone metabolism.

== See also ==
- Thyroid hormone resistance
