= Selenocysteine =

Selenium-containing amino acid

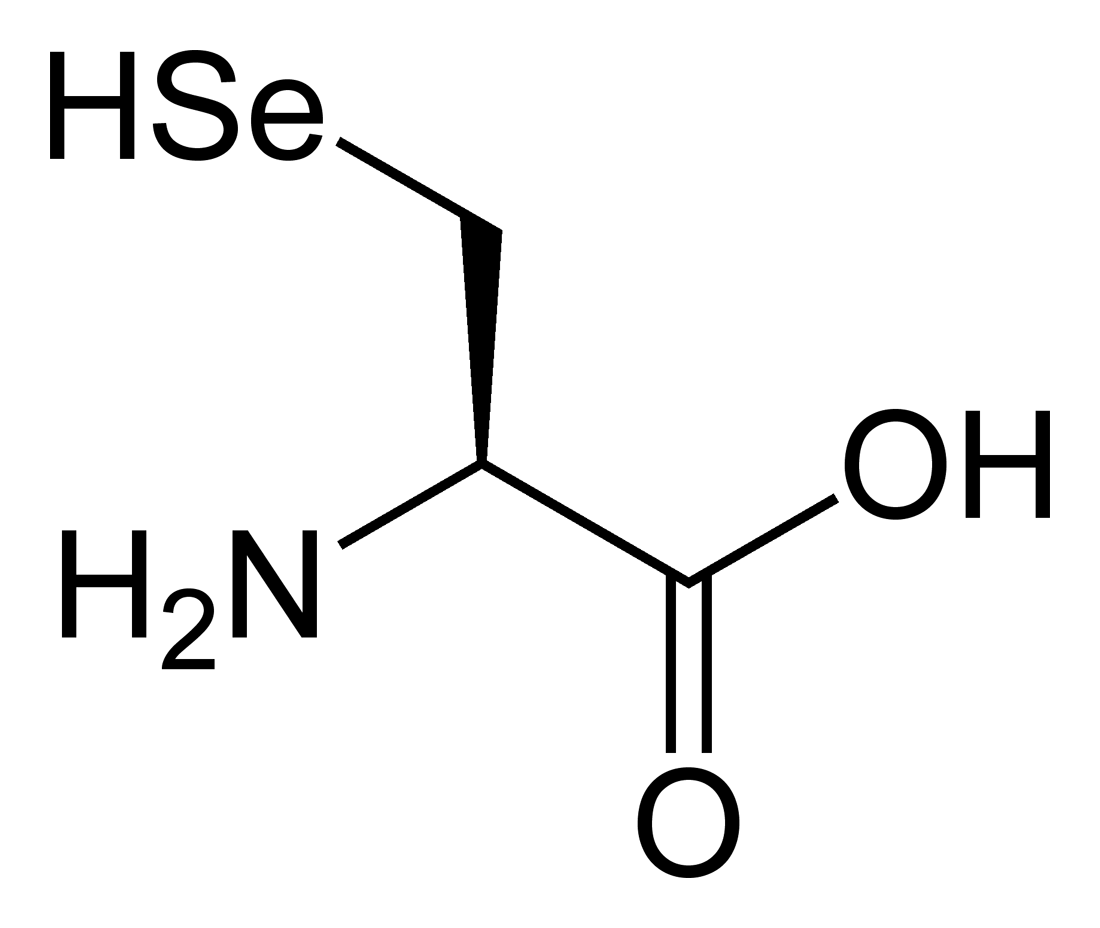

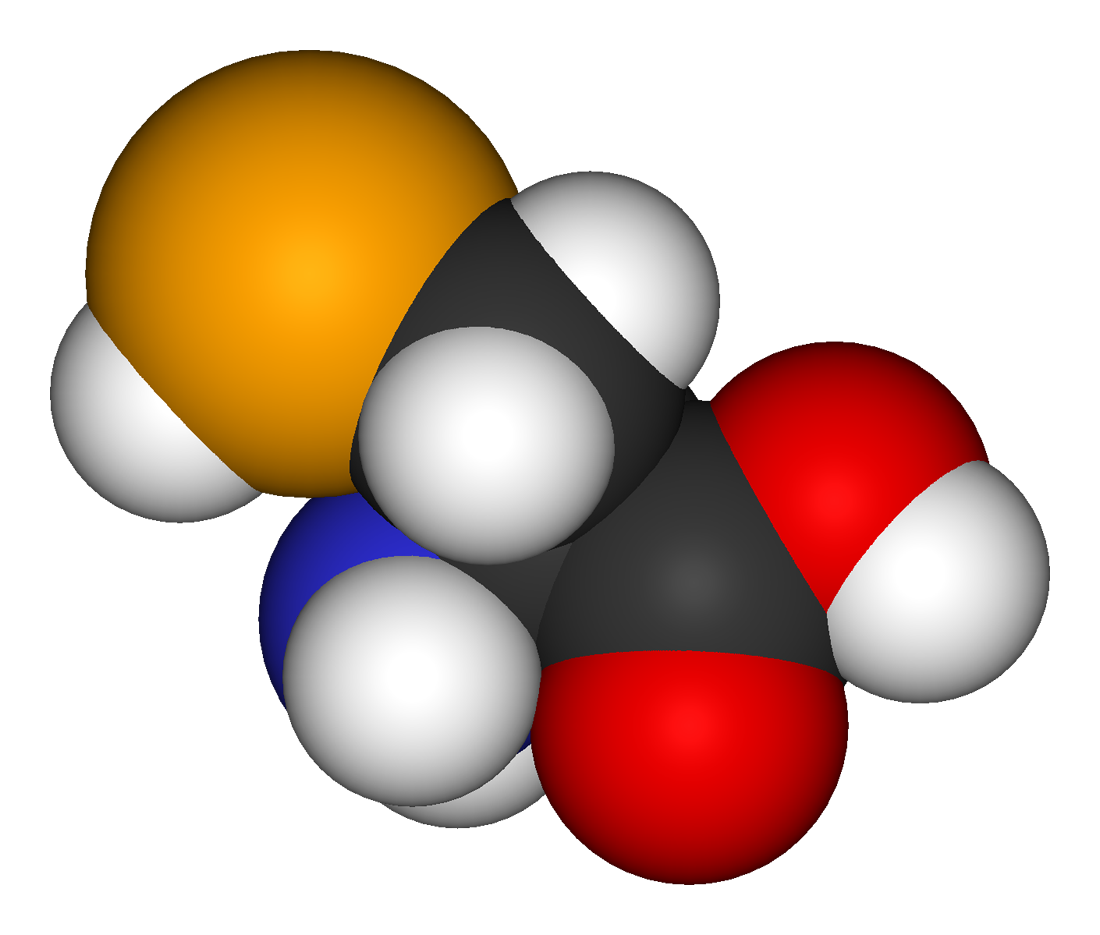

Names
- IUPAC name Selenocysteine
- Systematic IUPAC name 2-Amino-3-selanylpropanoic acid
- Other names L-Selenocysteine; Selenium-cysteine

Identifiers
CAS Number	3614-08-2
3D model (JSmol)	Interactive image; Zwitterion: Interactive image
ChEBI	CHEBI:16633
ChEMBL	ChEMBL109962
ChemSpider	23436
DrugBank	DB02345
ECHA InfoCard	100.236.386
KEGG	C05688
PubChem CID	25076
UNII	0CH9049VIS
CompTox Dashboard (EPA)	DTXSID00881371
- InChI: InChI=1S/C3H7NO2Se/c4-2(1-7)3(5)6/h2,7H,1,4H2,(H,5,6)/t2-/m0/s1 Key: ZKZBPNGNEQAJSX-REOHCLBHSA-N; InChI=1/C3H7NO2Se/c4-2(1-7)3(5)6/h2,7H,1,4H2,(H,5,6)/t2-/m0/s1 Key: ZKZBPNGNEQAJSX-REOHCLBHBZ
- SMILES: O=C(O)[C@@H](N)C[SeH]; Zwitterion: O=C([O-])[C@@H]([NH3+])C[SeH]

Properties
Chemical formula	C_{3}H_{7}NO_{2}Se
Molar mass	168.065 g·mol^{−1}

Properties
Acidity (pK_{a})	5.24, 5.43
- Except where otherwise noted, data are given for materials in their standard state (at 25 °C [77 °F], 100 kPa). verify (what is ?) Infobox references

Selenocysteine ball and stick model spinning

Selenocysteine (symbol Sec or U, in older publications also as Se-Cys) is the 21st proteinogenic amino acid. Selenoproteins contain selenocysteine residues. Selenocysteine is an analogue of the more common cysteine with selenium in place of the sulfur.

Selenocysteine is present in several enzymes (for example glutathione peroxidases, tetraiodothyronine 5′ deiodinases, thioredoxin reductases, formate dehydrogenases, glycine reductases, selenophosphate synthetase 2, methionine-R-sulfoxide reductase B1 (SEPX1), and some hydrogenases). It occurs in all three domains of life, including important enzymes (listed above) present in humans.

Selenocysteine was discovered in 1974 by biochemist Thressa Stadtman at the National Institutes of Health.

== Chemistry ==
Selenocysteine is the Se-analogue of cysteine. It is rarely encountered outside of living tissue (nor is it available commercially) because of its high susceptiblility to air-oxidation. More common is the oxidized derivative selenocystine, which has an Se-Se bond. Both selenocysteine and selenocystine are white solids. The Se-H group is more acidic (pK_{a} = 5.43) than the thiol group; thus, it is deprotonated at physiological pH.

== Structure ==
Selenocysteine has the same structure as cysteine, but with an atom of selenium taking the place of the usual sulfur; it has a selenol group. Like other natural proteinogenic amino acids, cysteine and selenocysteine have L chirality in the older D/L notation based on homology to D- and L-glyceraldehyde. In the newer R/S system of designating chirality, based on the atomic numbers of atoms near the asymmetric carbon, they have R chirality, because of the presence of sulfur or selenium as a second neighbor to the asymmetric carbon. The remaining chiral amino acids, having only lighter atoms in that position, have S chirality.)

Proteins which contain a selenocysteine residue are called selenoproteins. Most selenoproteins contain a single selenocysteine residue. Selenoproteins that exhibit catalytic activity are called selenoenzymes.

== Biology ==
Unlike the other amino acids, no free pool of selenocysteine exists in the cell. Its high reactivity would cause damage to cells. Instead, cells store selenium in the less reactive oxidized form, selenocystine, or in methylated form, selenomethionine.

=== Production ===
Selenocysteine synthesis occurs on a specialized tRNA, which also functions to incorporate it into nascent polypeptides. The primary and secondary structure of selenocysteine-specific tRNA, tRNA^{Sec}, differ from those of standard tRNAs in several respects, most notably in having an 8-base-pair (bacteria) or 10-base-pair (eukaryotes) acceptor stem, a long variable region arm, and substitutions at several well-conserved base positions. The selenocysteine tRNAs are initially charged with serine by seryl-tRNA ligase, but the resulting Ser-tRNA^{Sec} is not used for translation because it is not recognised by the normal translation elongation factor (EF-Tu in bacteria, eEF1A in eukaryotes).

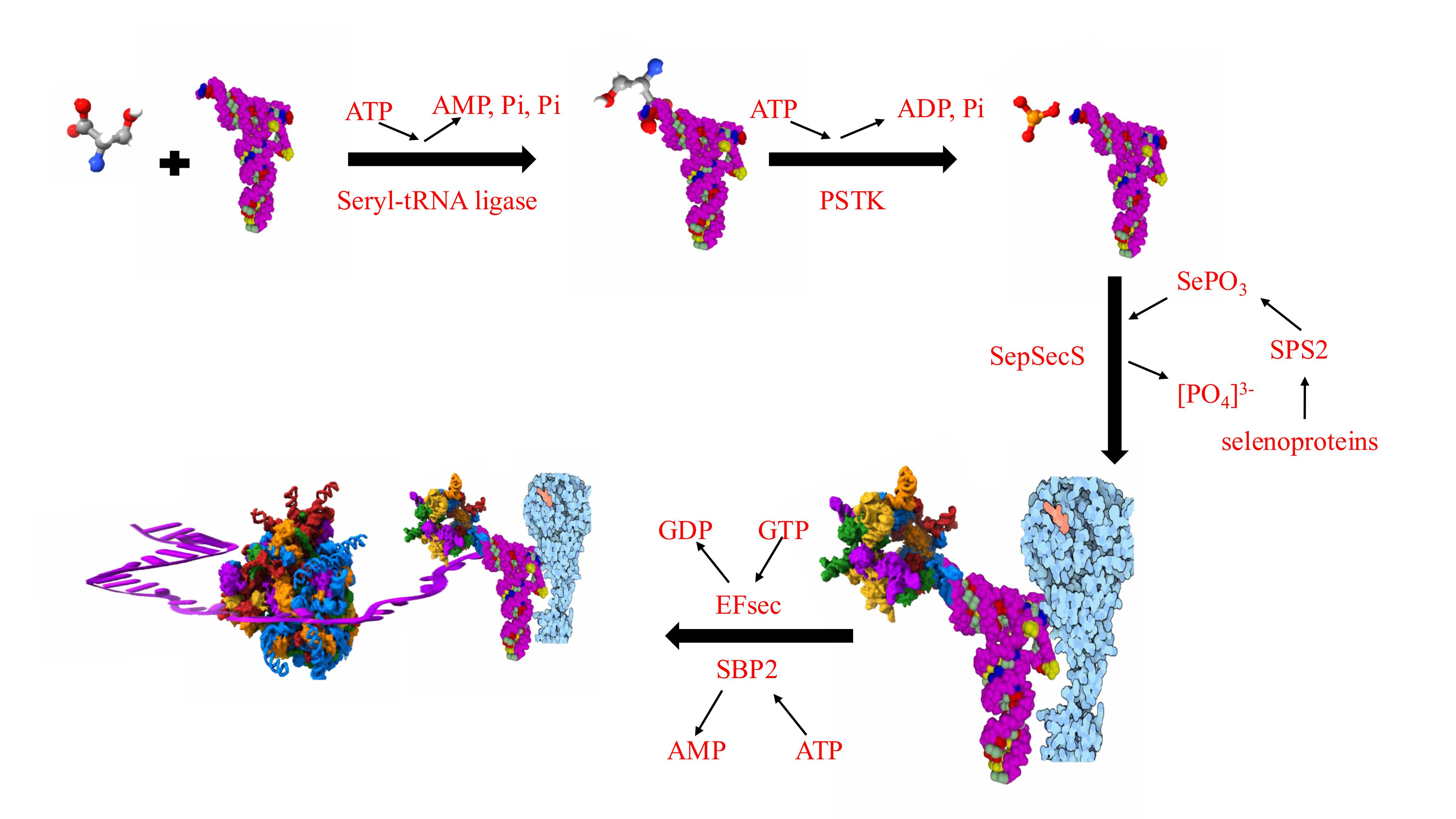
Selenocysteine synthesis

Rather, the tRNA-bound seryl residue is converted to a selenocysteine residue by other enzymes. In bacteria like E coli, this is done by the pyridoxal phosphate-containing enzyme selenocysteine synthase (EC 2.9.1.1). In eukaryotes and archaea, two enzymes are required to convert the tRNA-bound seryl residue into tRNA selenocysteinyl residue: L-seryl-tRNA(Sec) kinase (EC 2.7.1.164) and SepSecS (EC 2.9.1.2). Finally, the resulting Sec-tRNA^{Sec}is specifically bound to an alternative translational elongation factor (SelB or mSelB (or eEFSec)), which delivers it in a targeted manner to the ribosomes translating mRNAs for selenoproteins. The specificity of this delivery mechanism is brought about by the presence of an extra protein domain (in bacteria, SelB) or an extra subunit (SBP2 for eukaryotic mSelB/eEFSec) which bind to the corresponding RNA secondary structures formed by the SECIS elements in selenoprotein mRNAs.

=== Selenoproteins ===
Selenocysteine has a lower reduction potential than cysteine. These properties make it very suitable in proteins that are involved in antioxidant activity.

Although it is found in the three domains of life, it is not universal in all organisms. Unlike other amino acids present in biological proteins, selenocysteine is not coded for directly in the genetic code. Instead, it is encoded in a special way by a UGA codon, which is normally the "opal" stop codon. Such a mechanism is called translational recoding and its efficiency depends on the selenoprotein being synthesized and on translation initiation factors. When cells are grown in the absence of selenium, translation of selenoproteins terminates at the UGA codon, resulting in a truncated, nonfunctional enzyme. The UGA codon is made to encode selenocysteine by the presence of a selenocysteine insertion sequence (SECIS) in the mRNA. The SECIS element is defined by characteristic nucleotide sequences and secondary structure base-pairing patterns. In bacteria, the SECIS element is typically located immediately following the UGA codon within the reading frame for the selenoprotein. In Archaea and in eukaryotes, the SECIS element is in the 3′ untranslated region (3′ UTR) of the mRNA and can direct multiple UGA codons to encode selenocysteine residues.

As of 2021, 136 human proteins (in 37 families) are known to contain selenocysteine (selenoproteins).

=== Breakdown ===
Selenocysteine is decomposed by the enzyme selenocysteine lyase into L-alanine and selenide. This probably helps with the safe recycling of Sec during degradation of selenoproteins.

=== Toxicity ===
Just as selenomethionine can be randomly incorporated into proteins, selenocystine can also be mistakenly attached to tRNA^{Cys} by cysteinyl-tRNA synthetase and incorporated into proteins in lieu of cystine. This causes considerable toxicity. A variant synthase that can distinguish between Cys and Sec helps reduce toxicity.

=== Derivatives ===
Selenocysteine derivatives γ-glutamyl-Se-methylselenocysteine and Se-methylselenocysteine occur naturally in plants of the genera Allium and Brassica.

== Applications ==
Biotechnological applications of selenocysteine include use of ^{73}Se-labeled Sec (half-life of ^{73}Se = 7.2 hours) in positron emission tomography (PET) studies and ^{75}Se-labeled Sec (half-life of ^{75}Se = 118.5 days) in specific radiolabeling, facilitation of phase determination by multiwavelength anomalous diffraction in X-ray crystallography of proteins by introducing Sec alone, or Sec together with selenomethionine (SeMet), and incorporation of the stable ^{77}Se isotope, which has a nuclear spin of 1/2 and can be used for high-resolution NMR, among others.

== See also ==
- Pyrrolysine, another amino acid not in the basic set of 20.
- Selenomethionine, another selenium-containing amino acid, which is randomly substituted for methionine.
