= MSRB1 =

Protein-coding gene in the species Homo sapiens

Identifiers
- Aliases: MSRB1, SELR, SELX, SEPX1, SepR, HSPC270, methionine sulfoxide reductase B1, SELENOX, SELENOR
- External IDs: OMIM: 606216; MGI: 1351642; GeneCards: MSRB1
Available structures
PDB	Ortholog search: PDBe RCSB
PDB	List of PDB id codes 3MAO
Enzyme activity
EC #	BRENDA	ExPASy	KEGG	MetaCyc
1.8.4.12	↗	↗	↗	↗
1.8.4.14	↗	↗	↗	↗

Gene location (Human)
Chr.	Chromosome 16 (human)
Band	16p13.3	Start	1,938,229 bp
Band	16p13.3	End	1,943,199 bp

Gene location (Mouse)
Chr.	Chromosome 17 (mouse)
Band	17 A3.3|17 12.53 cM	Start	24,955,616 bp
Band	17 A3.3|17 12.53 cM	End	24,961,752 bp
RNA expression pattern
Bgee	Human / Mouse (ortholog); Top expressed in: blood; right lobe of liver; body of pancreas; trabecular bone; thoracic diaphragm; monocyte; granulocyte; bone marrow; periodontal fiber; human kidney / Top expressed in: granulocyte; left lobe of liver; parotid gland; sternocleidomastoid muscle; temporal muscle; triceps brachii muscle; tibiofemoral joint; interventricular septum; stroma of bone marrow; digastric muscle; More reference expression data
BioGPS	n/a
Gene ontology
Molecular function	oxidoreductase activity, acting on a sulfur group of donors, disulfide as acceptor; oxidoreductase activity; actin binding; zinc ion binding; metal ion binding; methionine-R-sulfoxide reductase activity; peptide-methionine (R)-S-oxide reductase activity; L-methionine-(R)-S-oxide reductase activity; protein binding
Cellular component	cytoplasm; cytosol; cytoskeleton; nucleus; actin cytoskeleton; cellular component
Biological process	immune system process; actin filament polymerization; innate immune response; response to oxidative stress; protein repair
Sources:Amigo / QuickGO
Orthologs
Databases	NCBI: entry; OMA: entry
Species	Human	Mouse
Entrez	51734	27361
Ensembl	ENSG00000198736	ENSMUSG00000075705
UniProt	Q9NZV6	Q9JLC3
RefSeq (mRNA)	NM_016332; NM_001382264; NM_001382265	NM_013759; NM_001346668
RefSeq (protein)	NP_057416; NP_001369193; NP_001369194	NP_001333597; NP_038787
Location (UCSC)	Chr 16: 1.94 – 1.94 Mb	Chr 17: 24.96 – 24.96 Mb
PubMed search
- Wikidata
View/Edit Human	View/Edit Mouse

Methionine-R-sulfoxide reductase B1, also called selenoprotein X, is an enzyme that in humans is encoded by the MSRB1 gene.

This gene encodes a selenoprotein, which contains a selenocysteine (Sec) residue at its active site. The selenocysteine is encoded by the UGA codon that normally signals translation termination. The 3' UTR of selenoprotein genes have a common stem-loop structure, the sec insertion sequence (SECIS), that is necessary for the recognition of UGA as a Sec codon rather than as a stop signal. This protein belongs to the methionine sulfoxide reductase B (MsrB) family, and it is expressed in a variety of adult and fetal tissues.

== See also ==
- MSRA (gene)
- MSRB2
- Methionine oxidation
