= L-seryl-tRNASec selenium transferase =

Selenocysteine biosynthesis enzyme

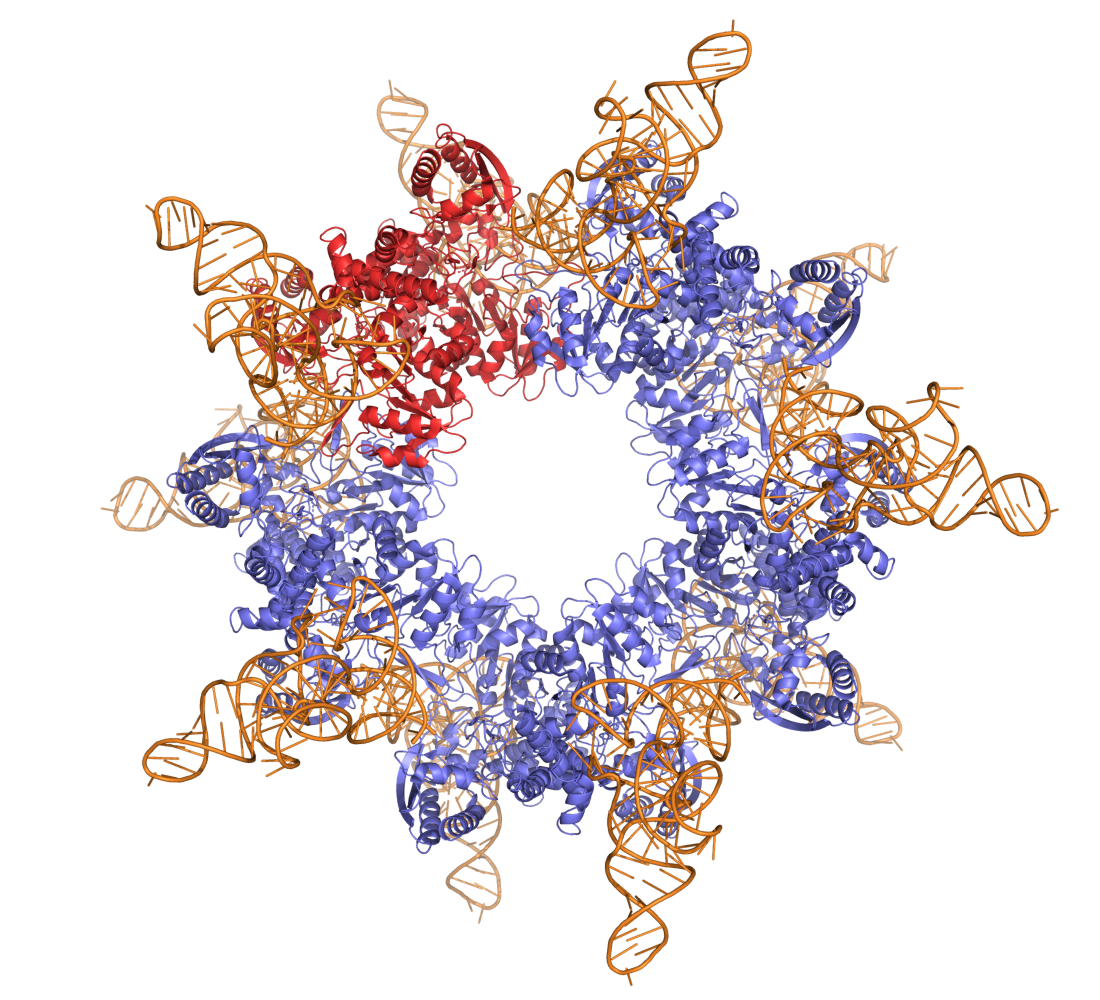
- SelA in complex with its tRNA substrate, Aquifex aeolicus PDB: 3W1K

Identifiers
- EC no.: 2.9.1.1

Databases
- BRENDA: enzyme data
- ExPASy: NiceZyme view
- KEGG: enzyme entry
- MetaCyc: metabolic pathway
- Rhea: reactions
- PDB structures: RCSB PDB PDBe PDBsum
- Gene Ontology: AmiGO / QuickGO
Search
- PMC: articles
- PubMed: articles
- NCBI: proteins

In enzymology, a L-seryl-tRNA^{Sec} selenium transferase (EC 2.9.1.1) is an enzyme that catalyzes the chemical reaction

L-seryl-tRNA^{Sec} + selenophosphate $\rightleftharpoons$ L-selenocysteinyl-tRNA^{Sec} + phosphate

Thus, the two substrates of this enzyme are L-seryl-tRNA^{Sec} and selenophosphate, whereas its two products are L-selenocysteinyl-tRNA^{Sec} and phosphate.

This enzyme belongs to the family of transferases, specifically those transferring selenium-containing groups selenotransferases. The systematic name of this enzyme class is selenophosphate:L-seryl-tRNA^{Sec} selenium transferase. Other names in common use include L-selenocysteinyl-tRNASel synthase, L-selenocysteinyl-tRNA^{Sec} synthase selenocysteine synthase, cysteinyl-tRNA^{Sec}-selenium transferase, and cysteinyl-tRNA^{Sec}-selenium transferase. This enzyme participates in selenoamino acid metabolism in bacteria. It employs one cofactor, pyridoxal phosphate.
