= GLRX2 =

Protein found in humans

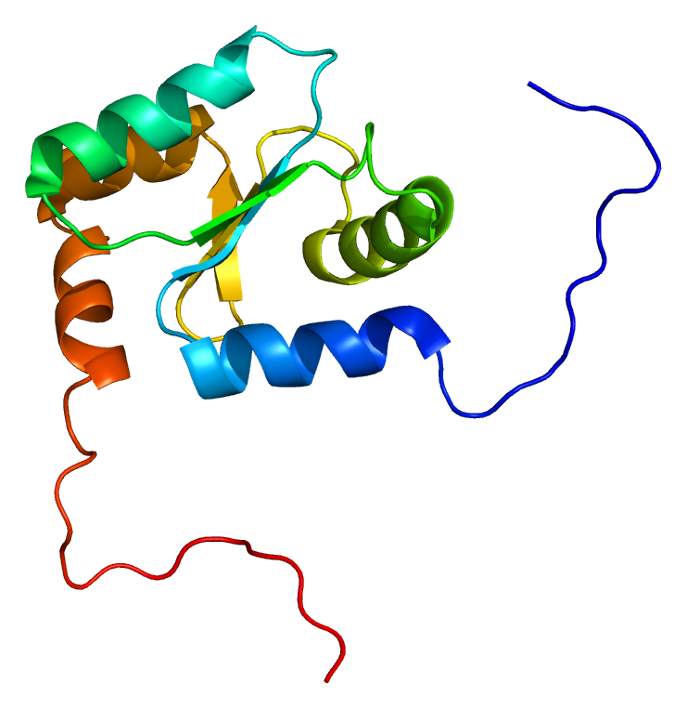

Identifiers
- Aliases: GLRX2, CGI-133, GRX2, glutaredoxin 2
- External IDs: OMIM: 606820; MGI: 1916617; GeneCards: GLRX2
Available structures
PDB	Ortholog search: PDBe RCSB
PDB	List of PDB id codes 2CQ9, 2FLS, 2HT9

Gene location (Human)
Chr.	Chromosome 1 (human)
Band	1q31.2	Start	193,090,866 bp
Band	1q31.2	End	193,106,114 bp

Gene location (Mouse)
Chr.	Chromosome 1 (mouse)
Band	1 F|1 62.53 cM	Start	143,592,076 bp
Band	1 F|1 62.53 cM	End	143,625,414 bp
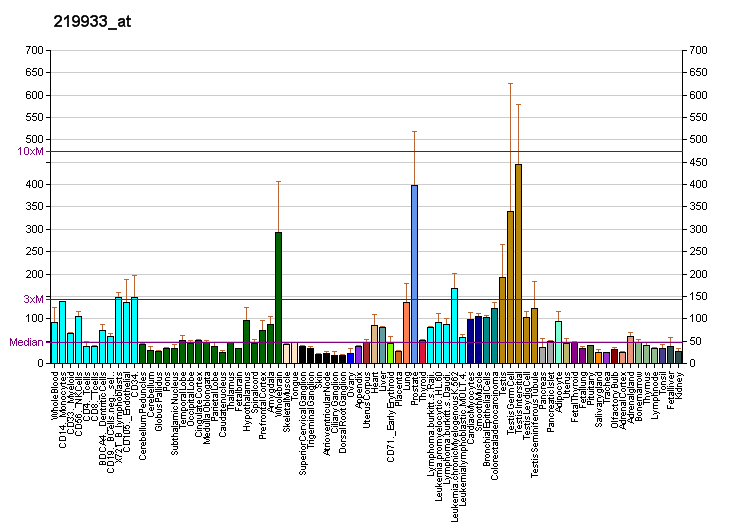
RNA expression pattern
Bgee	Human / Mouse (ortholog); Top expressed in: sperm; left testis; right testis; oocyte; endothelial cell; pons; right ventricle; left ventricle; Brodmann area 23; secondary oocyte / Top expressed in: ventricular zone; facial motor nucleus; endocardial cushion; atrioventricular valve; seminiferous tubule; neural layer of retina; Region I of hippocampus proper; lobe of prostate; superior frontal gyrus; muscle of thigh; More reference expression data
BioGPS	More reference expression data
Gene ontology
Molecular function	metal ion binding; arsenate reductase (glutaredoxin) activity; electron transfer activity; glutathione disulfide oxidoreductase activity; iron-sulfur cluster binding; protein-disulfide reductase activity; 2 iron, 2 sulfur cluster binding; protein disulfide isomerase activity
Cellular component	nucleoplasm; mitochondrion; mitochondrial matrix; nucleus; intracellular membrane-bounded organelle; soma; dendrite
Biological process	glutathione metabolic process; DNA protection; response to temperature stimulus; response to redox state; regulation of signal transduction; apoptotic process; ageing; regulation of transcription, DNA-templated; response to organic substance; response to hydrogen peroxide; cell differentiation; cellular response to superoxide; cell redox homeostasis; electron transport chain
Sources:Amigo / QuickGO
Orthologs
Databases	NCBI: entry; OMA: entry
Species	Human	Mouse
Entrez	51022	69367
Ensembl	ENSG00000023572	ENSMUSG00000018196
UniProt	Q9NS18	Q923X4
RefSeq (mRNA)	NM_001243399; NM_016066; NM_197962	NM_001038592; NM_001038593; NM_001038594; NM_023505
RefSeq (protein)	NP_001230328; NP_057150; NP_932066	NP_001033681; NP_001033682; NP_001033683; NP_075994
Location (UCSC)	Chr 1: 193.09 – 193.11 Mb	Chr 1: 143.59 – 143.63 Mb
PubMed search
- Wikidata
View/Edit Human	View/Edit Mouse

Glutaredoxin 2 (GLRX2) is an enzyme that in humans, is encoded by the GLRX2 gene. GLRX2, also known as GRX2, is a glutaredoxin family protein and a thiol-disulfide oxidoreductase that maintains cellular thiol homeostasis. This gene consists of four exons and three introns, spanned 10 kilobase pairs, and localized to chromosome 1q31.2–31.3.

Alternative splicing of GLRX2 leads to three isoforms of Grx2. One isoform, Grx2a, localizes to the mitochondria, is ubiquitously expressed in tissues (e.g. heart, skeletal muscle, kidney, and liver), regulates mitochondrial redox homeostasis, and protects cells against oxidative stress. Isoforms Grx2b and Grx2c, both localized to the nucleus and cytosol, are expressed only in testes and cancer cell lines and facilitate cellular differentiation and transformation, potentially inducing tumor progression.

== Structure ==
=== Gene ===
The transcripts of mitochondrial and nuclear Grx2 isoforms, Grx2a and Grx2b, respectively, differ in the first exon, with the exon 1 in Grx2b located upstream of that in Grx2a. Grx2c is derived from alternative splicing of the Grx2b transcript with a shorter exon 1 than that of Grx2b.

=== Protein ===
As a GRX family protein, Grx2 has an N-terminal thioredoxin domain, possessing a ^{37}CSYC^{40} active site motif with a serine residue replacing the conserved proline residue. This amino acid substitution allows the main chain of Grx2 to be more flexible, promoting coordination of the iron-sulfur cluster and facilitating deglutathionylation by enhanced glutathione-binding. The cysteine pair (Cys28, Cys113) falls outside of the active site, and it is completely conserved in Grx2 proteins but not found in some other GRX family proteins (i.e. Grx1 and Grx5). A disulfide bond between this cysteine pair increases structural stability and provides resistance to over-oxidation induced enzymatic inactivation.

== Function ==
Grx2 functions as a part of the cellular redox signaling pathway and antioxidant defense mechanism. As a GRX family protein, Grx2 acts as an electron donor to deglutathionylate proteins. It has also been shown to reduce both thioredoxin 2 and thioredoxin 1 and protects cells from apoptosis induced by auranofin and 4-hydroxynonenal. Grx2 is also an electron acceptor. It can catalyze the reversible oxidation and glutathionylation of mitochondrial membrane thiol proteins. Additionally, NADPH and thioredoxin reductase efficiently reduce both the active site disulfide of Grx2 and the GSH-Grx2 intermediate formed in the reduction of glutathionylated substrates.

Enzymatic activity of Grx2 leads to its role in regulating redox-induced apoptosis. Grx2 over-expression protects cells against H_{2}O_{2}-induced damage while Grx2 knockdown showed the opposite effect. The protection role of Grx2 against H_{2}O_{2}-induced apoptosis is likely associated with its ability to preserve the electron transport chain complex I. In addition to H_{2}O_{2}, Grx2a overexpression is resistant to apoptosis induced by other oxidative stress reagents (i.e., doxorubicin (Dox) and phenylarsine oxide), due to reduced cardiolipin oxidation and subsequent cytochrome c release. Interesting, Grx2 has also been found to prevent aggregation of mutant SOD1 in mitochondria and abolish its toxicity.

Being a redox sensor, Grx2 activity is tightly regulated by the oxidative state of the environment via iron–sulfur cluster. In steady state, Grx2 forms dimers to coordinate iron-sulfur clusters, which in turn inactivate Grx2's activity by sequestering the active-site cysteines. During oxidative stress, the dimers separate into iron-free active monomers, which restore Grx2's activity.

== Clinical significance ==
From 42 cases of non-small cell lung cancer patients, the expression level of Grx2 showed a significant correlation with the degree of differentiation in adenocarcinoma and a clear inverse correlation with proliferation. In tumor cells, cells with decreased Grx2 are dramatically sensitized to cell death induced by the anti-cancer drug, DOX.

In cardiovascular disease, Grx2a overexpression protects mouse heart from Dox and ischemia-induced cardiac injury, potentially via increasing mitochondrial protein glutathionylation. Conversely, Grx2 knockout hearts developed left ventricular hypertrophy and fibrosis, leading to hypertension. The mechanistic study shows that Grx2 knockout decreased mitochondrial ATP production, possibly via increased glutathionylation and thereby inhibition of complex I.

== Interactions ==
Grx2 has been shown to physically interact with MDH2, PITPNB, GPX4, CYCS, BAG3, and TXNRD1 in one independent high-throughput proteomic analysis.
