= Psychological therapies for dementia =

Treatment for dementia

Psychological therapies for dementia are of recognised help. Improved clinical assessment in early stages of Alzheimer's disease and other forms of dementia, increased cognitive stimulation of the elderly, and the prescription of drugs to slow cognitive decline have resulted in increased detection in the early stages.

== Classification ==
Psychological therapies which are considered as potential treatments for dementia include music therapy, reminiscence therapy, cognitive reframing for caretakers, validation therapy, and mental exercise. Interventions may be used in conjunction with pharmaceutical treatment and can be classified within behavior, emotion, cognition or stimulation oriented approaches. Research on efficacy is reduced.

=== Behavioral interventions ===
Behavioral interventions attempt to identify and reduce the antecedents and consequences of problem behaviors. This approach has not shown success in the overall functioning of patients, but can help to reduce some specific problem behaviors, such as incontinence. There is still a lack of high-quality data on the effectiveness of these techniques in other behavior problems such as wandering.

=== Emotion-oriented interventions ===
Emotion-oriented interventions include reminiscence therapy, validation therapy, supportive psychotherapy, sensory integration or snoezelen, and simulated presence therapy. Supportive psychotherapy has received little or no formal scientific study, but some clinicians find it useful in helping mildly impaired patients adjust to their illness. Reminiscence therapy (RT) involves the discussion of past experiences individually or in group, many times with the aid of photographs, household items, music and sound recordings, or other familiar items from the past. Although there are few quality studies on the effectiveness of RT it may be beneficial for cognition and mood. Simulated presence therapy (SPT) is based on attachment theories and is normally carried out playing a recording with voices of the closest relatives of the patient. There is preliminary evidence indicating that SPT may reduce anxiety and challenging behaviors. Finally, validation therapy is based on acceptance of the reality and personal truth of another's experience, while sensory integration is based on exercises aimed to stimulate senses. There is little evidence to support the usefulness of these therapies.

=== Cognition-oriented treatments ===
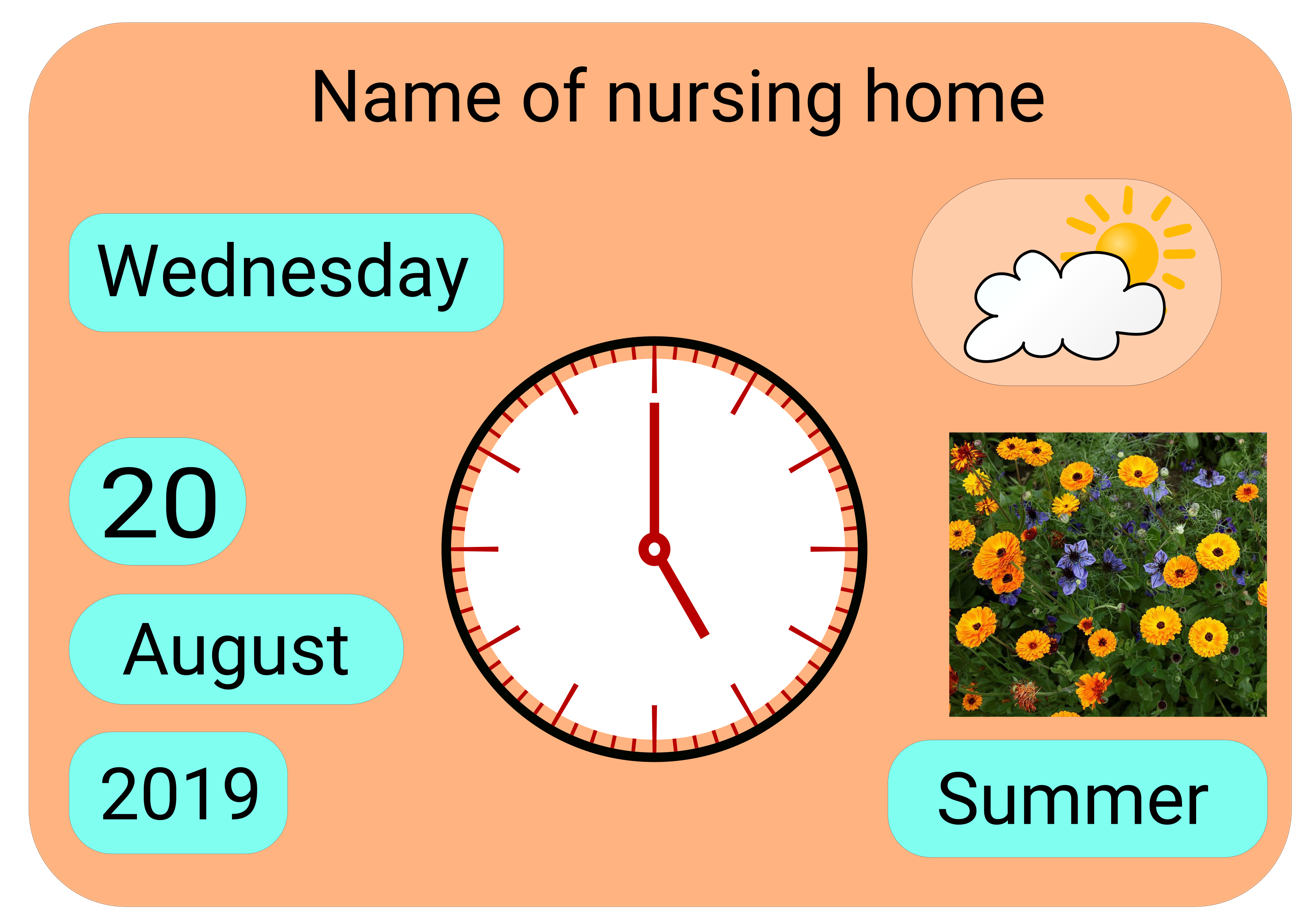
Design draft for a reality orientation board used to help people with dementia or in post-operative delirium.

The aim of cognition-oriented treatments, which include reality orientation and cognitive retraining is the restoration of cognitive deficits. Reality orientation consists in the presentation of information about time, place or person in order to ease the understanding of the person about its surroundings and his place in them, for example using an orientation board. On the other hand, cognitive retraining tries to improve impaired capacities by exercitation of mental abilities. Both have shown some efficacy improving cognitive capacities, although in some works these effects were transient and negative effects, such as frustration, have also been reported. Most of the programs inside this approach are fully or partially computerized and others are fully paper-based, such as the cognitive retention therapy method.

=== Stimulation-oriented treatments ===
Stimulation-oriented treatments include art, music and pet therapies, exercise, and any other kind of recreational activities for patients. Stimulation has modest support for improving behavior, mood, and, to a lesser extent, function. Nevertheless, as important as these effects are, the main support for the use of stimulation therapies is improvement in the patient's daily life routines.

A study published in 2006 tested the effects of cognitive stimulation therapy (CST) on the demented elderly's quality of life. The researchers looked at the effect of CST on cognitive function, the effect of improved cognitive function on quality of life, then the link between the three (CST, cognition, and QoL). The study found an improvement in cognitive function from the CST treatment, as measured by the mini–mental state examination (MMSE) and the Alzheimer's disease assessment scale (ADAS-Cog), as well as an improvement in quality of life self-reported by the participants using the Quality of Life-AD measure. The study then used regression models to explain the correlation between the CST therapy and quality of life to see if the improved cognitive function was the primary mediating factor for the improved quality of life. The models supported the correlation and proposed that it was the improved cognition more than other factors (such as reduced depression symptoms and less anxiety) that led to the participants reporting back that they had a better quality of life (with significant improvements especially in energy level, memory, relationship with significant other, and ability to do chores.)

Another study from 2010 by London College tested the efficacy of cognitive stimulation therapy. Participants were tested using an MMSE to test their level of cognitive ability and determine whether they qualified to be included in the study. The participants had to have no other health problems allowing for the experiment to have accurate internal validity. The results clearly showed that those who were given cognitive stimulation therapy did significantly better on all memory tasks than those that did not receive the therapy. Out of the eleven memory tasks that were given, ten of the memory tasks were improved by the therapeutic group. The study demonstrated that patients with dementia benefit significantly from CST. As in the 2006 study, the improvement of the participants' cognitive abilities can ultimately improve their daily lives since it helps with activities such as being able to speak and remember words.

In July 2015, the Sheffield Health & Social Care NHS Foundation Trust and the University of Sheffield in the UK undertook trials on the use of a robot seal from Japan in the management of distressed dementia patients. The seal, named "Paro", has some artificial intelligence and can "learn" its own name and repeat behaviours.

== Psychological approaches to neuropsychiatric symptoms ==
Out of a number of psychological therapies examined, only behavior management therapy has demonstrated effectiveness in treating dementia-associated neuropsychiatric symptoms.

== See also ==
- Dementia caregiving
