= SH3BGRL3 =

Protein-coding gene in humans

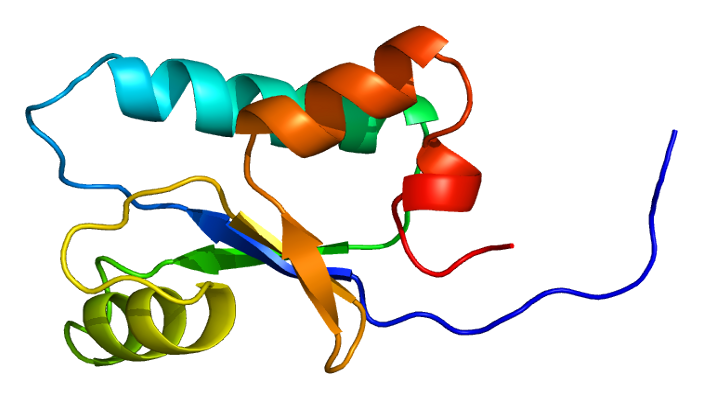

Identifiers
- Aliases: SH3BGRL3, HEL-S-297, SH3BP-1, TIP-B1, SH3 domain binding glutamate rich protein like 3
- External IDs: OMIM: 615679; MGI: 1920973; GeneCards: SH3BGRL3
Available structures
PDB	Ortholog search: PDBe RCSB
PDB	List of PDB id codes 1SJ6

Gene location (Human)
Chr.	Chromosome 1 (human)
Band	1p36.11	Start	26,280,086 bp
Band	1p36.11	End	26,281,522 bp

Gene location (Mouse)
Chr.	Chromosome 4 (mouse)
Band	4|4 D2.3	Start	133,854,717 bp
Band	4|4 D2.3	End	133,856,100 bp
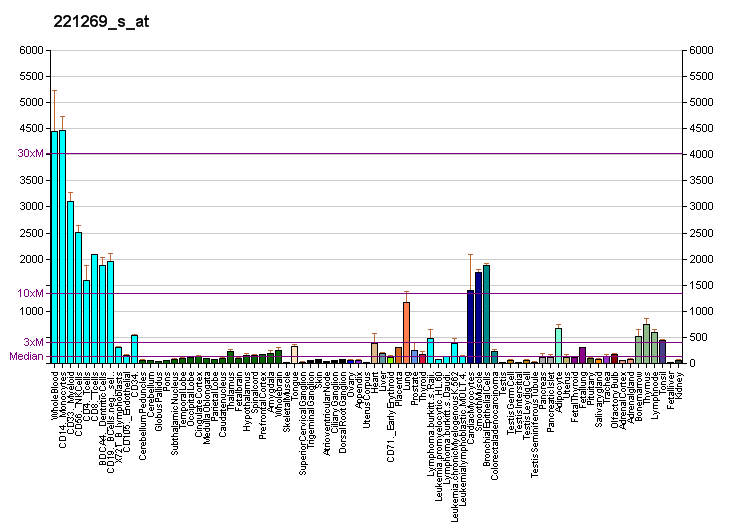
RNA expression pattern
Bgee	Human / Mouse (ortholog); Top expressed in: granulocyte; monocyte; mucosa of transverse colon; right lung; Descending thoracic aorta; ascending aorta; rectum; skin of abdomen; spleen; upper lobe of left lung / Top expressed in: granulocyte; mesenteric lymph nodes; seminal vesicula; thymus; zygote; tibiofemoral joint; spleen; epithelium of stomach; lip; stroma of bone marrow; More reference expression data
BioGPS	More reference expression data
Gene ontology
Molecular function	electron transfer activity; protein-disulfide reductase activity
Cellular component	nucleus; extracellular exosome; cytoplasm; nuclear body
Biological process	cell redox homeostasis; electron transport chain
Sources:Amigo / QuickGO
Orthologs
Databases	NCBI: entry; OMA: entry
Species	Human	Mouse
Entrez	83442	73723
Ensembl	ENSG00000142669	ENSMUSG00000028843
UniProt	Q9H299	Q91VW3
RefSeq (mRNA)	NM_031286	NM_080559
RefSeq (protein)	NP_112576	NP_542126
Location (UCSC)	Chr 1: 26.28 – 26.28 Mb	Chr 4: 133.85 – 133.86 Mb
PubMed search
- Wikidata
View/Edit Human	View/Edit Mouse

SH3 domain-binding glutamic acid-rich-like protein 3 is a protein that in humans is encoded by the SH3BGRL3 gene.

The 10.5kDa protein SH3 binding glutamic acid-rich protein-like 3 has an isoelectric point of 5.0. SH3 binding glutamic acid-rich (SH3BGR) gene is located to human chromosome 21. Two homologous genes, SH3BGRL and SH3BGRL3 are located to chromosome Xq13.3 and 1p34.3-35, respectively and code for small proteins similar to the N-terminal region of the SH3BGR protein. SH3BGRL3 protein shows a significant similarity to glutaredoxin 1 of E. coli, and all the three proteins are predicted to belong to thioredoxin-like protein family. Glutaredoxins (GRXs) are ubiquitous oxidoreductases, which catalyze the reduction of many intra-cellular protein disulfides and play an important role in many redox pathways. However, the SH3BGRL3 protein lacks the enzymatic function of glutaredoxins and may have a role as a regulator of redox activity.

== Role in cancer ==
Proteins such as glutaredoxin and thioredoxin are reported as up-regulated in many cancers such as lung and pancreatic; they have been implicated in increased resistance of cancer cells to free-radicals. There is little current evidence which directly links SH3GRPL3 with survival in cancer cells, however the protein has recently been identified as up-regulated in glioblastoma multiforme compared to normal cerebral tissue on proteomic analysis. Studies of acute promyelocytic leukemia cell line NB4 have also reported up-regulation of the protein. Conversely, the related protein SH3BGRL is reported to be downregulated in fibroblasts, lymphoid cells, and splenic tumor cells transformed by the viral oncogene v-Rel. Co-expression of SH3BGRL with v-Rel in primary splenic lymphocytes reduced the number of colonies formed by 76%. Xu et al. reported SH3BGRPL3 protein as a post-translational modification of the 27kDa tumor necrosis factor alpha (TNF-α) inhibitory protein, TIP-B1. This protein is potentially involved in resistance of cells to the apoptosis-inducing effect of TNF-α.
