= Glutaredoxin 2 (bacterial) =

Glutaredoxin 2, C terminal domain
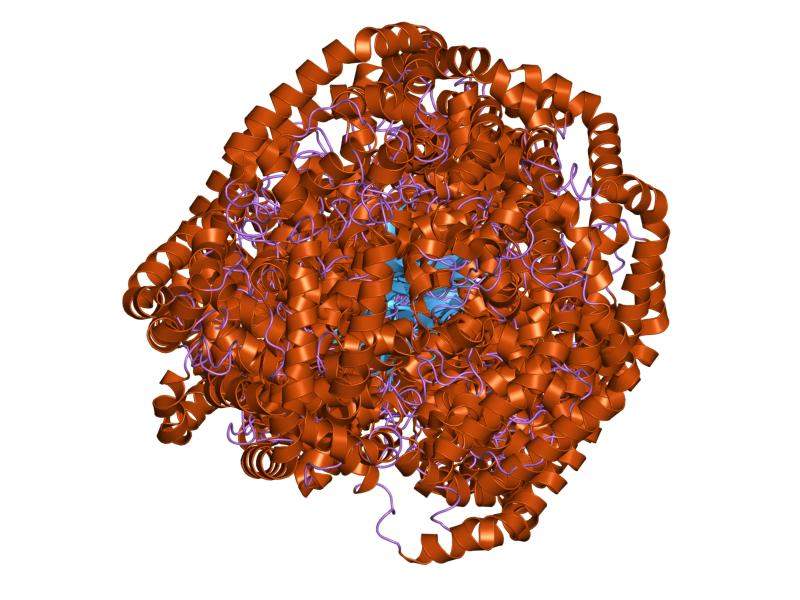
- nmr solution structure of reduced e. coli glutaredoxin 2

Identifiers
- Symbol: Glutaredoxin2_C
- Pfam: PF04399
- InterPro: IPR007494
- SCOP2: 1g7o / SCOPe / SUPFAM
- CDD: cd03199
Available protein structures:
- PDB: IPR007494 PF04399 (ECOD; PDBsum)
- AlphaFold: IPR007494; PF04399

In molecular biology, the glutaredoxin 2 family is a family of bacterial glutaredoxins. Unlike other glutaredoxins, glutaredoxin 2 (Grx2) cannot reduce ribonucleotide reductase. Grx2 has significantly higher catalytic activity in the reduction of mixed disulphides with glutathione (GSH) compared with other glutaredoxins. The active site residues (Cys9-Pro10-Tyr11-Cys12, in Escherichia coli Grx2, which are found at the interface between the N- and C-terminal domains are identical to other glutaredoxins, but there is no other similarity between glutaredoxin 2 and other glutaredoxins. Grx2 is structurally similar to glutathione-S-transferases (GST), but there is no obvious sequence similarity. The inter-domain contacts are mainly hydrophobic, suggesting that the two domains are unlikely to be stable on their own. Both domains are needed for correct folding and activity of Grx2. It is thought that the primary function of Grx2 is to catalyse reversible glutathionylation of proteins with GSH in cellular redox regulation including the response to oxidative stress. These enzymes are not related to GLRX2.
