= Susan Wyllie =

British biochemist and academic

Susan Wyllie FRSE

Academic background
- Education: University of Edinburgh (PhD, BSc)
- Thesis: Structural and functional characterisation of the major outer membrane protein of Chlamydia Psittaci (1998)

Academic work
- Discipline: Biochemist
- Institutions: University of Dundee; University of North Carolina at Chapel Hill

Susan Wyllie is an British biochemist and academic. She is currently the professor of biochemical pharmacology at the University of Dundee, and she was awarded a Fellowship of the Royal Society of Edinburgh in 2026.

== Early life and education ==
Wyllie grew up in Coldstream, Scotland.

In 1991, Wyllie enrolled at the University of Edinburgh and studied biochemistry. In 1995, she graduated with a Bachelor of Science. Under the supervision of David Longbottom and Richard Ashley, she continued research into Chlamydia at the Moredun Research Institute. Her thesis was titled Structural and functional characterisation of the major outer membrane protein of Chlamydia Psittaci. In 1998, Wyllie was conferred a Doctor of Philosophy.

== Career ==
Upon graduation, Wyllie joined the University of North Carolina at Chapel Hill, as a postdoctoral researcher under Jane E. Raulston. She continued researching into Chlamydia. In 2001, she returned to Scotland and joined the University of Dundee, as a senior research associate under Alan Fairlamb. Wyllie researched on drug mechanism of action in Leishmania.

In 2015, Wyllie established the Mode of Action Group, a research group under the Wellcome Centre for Anti-Infectives Research. The group conducts studies to discover new drugs for chemically validated drug targets. In 2019, Wyllie became a principal investigator.

In 2024, she was appointed the professor of biochemical pharmacology. In 2026, Wyllie was elected a Fellow of the Royal Society of Edinburgh, in the discipline of biomedical and cognitive sciences.

== Research ==
Wyllie's research is on kinetoplastid biology and parasitology. In February 2012, Wyllie was part of a team that identified fexinidazole as a treatment for Leishmaniasis. In recognition of her research, she was awarded the C. A. Wright Memorial Medal by the British Society for Parasitology.

To date, Wyllie has authored or co-authored more than 100 publications, and her research group has contributed to the development of five clinical drug candidates.

== Personal life ==
Wyllie enjoys running, especially in Tentsmuir Forest.

== Selected publications ==
- Wyllie, Susan; Cunningham, Mark L.; Fairlamb, Alan H. (13 July 2004). "Dual Action of Antimonial Drugs on Thiol Redox Metabolism in the Human Pathogen Leishmania donovani". Journal of Biological Chemistry. 279 (38): 39925–39932. doi:10.1074/jbc.M405635200. eISSN 1083-351X. ISSN 0021-9258. LCCN 06046735. OCLC 54114375. PMID 15252045. CODEN JBCHA3.
- Wyllie, Susan; Patterson, Stephen; Stojanovski, Laste; Simeons, Frederick R. C.; Norval, Suzanne; Kime, Robert; Read, Kevin D.; Fairlamb, Alan H. (1 February 2012). "The Anti-Trypanosome Drug Fexinidazole Shows Potential for Treating Visceral Leishmaniasis". Science Translational Medicine. 4 (119): 119re1. doi:10.1126/scitranslmed.3003326. eISSN 1946-6242. ISSN 1946-6234. PMC 3457684. PMID 22301556.
- Patterson, Stephen; Wyllie, Susan (26 April 2014). "Nitro drugs for the treatment of trypanosomatid diseases: past, present, and future prospects". Trends in Parasitology. 30 (6): 289–298. doi:10.1016/j.pt.2014.04.003. PMC 4045206. PMID 24776300.
- Wyllie, Susan; Brand, Stephen; Thomas, Michael; De Rycker, Manu; Chung, Chun-wa; Pena, Imanol; Bingham, Ryan P.; Bueren-Calabuig, Juan A.; Cantizani, Juan; Cebrian, David; Craggs, Peter D.; Ferguson, Liam; Goswami, Panchali; Hobrath, Judith; Howe, Jonathan (7 May 2019). "Preclinical candidate for the treatment of visceral leishmaniasis that acts through proteasome inhibition". Proceedings of the National Academy of Sciences. 116 (19): 9318–9323. Bibcode:2019PNAS..116.9318W. doi:10.1073/pnas.1820175116. eISSN 1091-6490. ISSN 0027-8424. JSTOR 00278424. LCCN 16010069. OCLC 43473694. PMC 6511062. PMID 30962368.
- De Rycker, Manu; Wyllie, Susan; Horn, David; Read, Kevin D.; Gilbert, Ian H. (22 August 2022). "Anti-trypanosomatid drug discovery: progress and challenges". Nature Reviews Microbiology. 21 (1): 35–50. doi:10.1038/s41579-022-00777-y. eISSN 1740-1534. ISSN 1740-1526. LCCN 2009252829. OCLC 780556277. PMC 9395782. PMID 35995950. CODEN NRMACK.
