= Elopement (disambiguation) =

Elopement is a marriage conducted in sudden and secretive fashion.

Elopement may also refer to:

- Elopement (film), a 1951 comedy
- Wandering (dementia)
