= Glutathione amide-dependent peroxidase =

Identifiers
- EC no.: 1.11.1.17

Databases
- IntEnz: IntEnz view
- BRENDA: BRENDA entry
- ExPASy: NiceZyme view
- KEGG: KEGG entry
- MetaCyc: metabolic pathway
- PRIAM: profile
- PDB structures: RCSB PDB PDBe PDBsum
Search
- PMC: articles
- PubMed: articles
- NCBI: proteins

Glutathione amide-dependent peroxidase (EC 1.11.1.17) is an enzyme with systematic name glutathione amide:hydrogen-peroxide oxidoreductase. This enzyme catalyses the following chemical reaction

2
glutathione amide
H_{2}O_{2}
2 H_{2}O
glutathione amide disulfide

This enzyme from the proteobacterium Marichromatium gracile is a chimeric protein. It contains a peroxiredoxin-like N-terminus and a glutaredoxin-like C terminus.
