= Trypanothione =

- Trypanthione (oxidized) Reduced form (top) and oxidized form (bottom)

Names
- Other names N1,N8-Bis(glutathionyl)spermidine

Identifiers
CAS Number	96304-42-6 (oxidized)
3D model (JSmol)	Interactive image
ChEBI	CHEBI:35490
ChemSpider	102998 (oxidized); 396023 (reduced)
PubChem CID	115098 (oxidized)
CompTox Dashboard (EPA)	DTXSID70242197
- InChI: InChI=1S/C27H47N9O10S2/c28-16(26(43)44)4-6-20(37)35-18-14-47-48-15-19(36-21(38)7-5-17(29)27(45)46)25(42)34-13-23(40)32-11-3-9-30-8-1-2-10-31-22(39)12-33-24(18)41/h16-19,30H,1-15,28-29H2,(H,31,39)(H,32,40)(H,33,41)(H,34,42)(H,35,37)(H,36,38)(H,43,44)(H,45,46)/t16-,17-,18-,19-/m0/s1 Key: LZMSXDHGHZKXJD-VJANTYMQSA-N; InChI=1/C27H47N9O10S2/c28-16(26(43)44)4-6-20(37)35-18-14-47-48-15-19(36-21(38)7-5-17(29)27(45)46)25(42)34-13-23(40)32-11-3-9-30-8-1-2-10-31-22(39)12-33-24(18)41/h16-19,30H,1-15,28-29H2,(H,31,39)(H,32,40)(H,33,41)(H,34,42)(H,35,37)(H,36,38)(H,43,44)(H,45,46)/t16-,17-,18-,19-/m0/s1 Key: LZMSXDHGHZKXJD-VJANTYMQBI
- SMILES: O=C(O)[C@@H](N)CCC(=O)N[C@@H]1C(=O)NCC(=O)NCCCNCCCCNC(=O)CNC(=O)[C@@H](NC(=O)CC[C@@H](C(=O)O)N)CSSC1

Properties
Chemical formula	C_{27}H_{47}N_{9}O_{10}S_{2} (oxidized); C_{27}H_{49}N_{9}O_{10}S_{2} (reduced)
Molar mass	721.84 g/mol (oxidized); 723.86 g/mol (reduced)
- Except where otherwise noted, data are given for materials in their standard state (at 25 °C [77 °F], 100 kPa). verify (what is ?) Infobox references

Trypanothione is an unusual form of glutathione containing two molecules of glutathione joined by a spermidine (polyamine) linker. It is found in parasitic protozoa such as leishmania and trypanosomes. These protozoal parasites are the cause of leishmaniasis, sleeping sickness and Chagas' disease. Trypanothione was discovered by Alan Fairlamb. Its structure was proven by chemical synthesis. It is present mainly in the Kinetoplastida but can be found in other parasitic protozoa such as Entamoeba histolytica. Since this thiol is absent from humans and is essential for the survival of the parasites, the enzymes that make and use this molecule are targets for the development of new drugs to treat these diseases.

Trypanothione-dependent enzymes include reductases, peroxidases, glyoxalases and transferases. Trypanothione-disulfide reductase (TryR) was the first trypanothione-dependent enzyme to be discovered (EC 1.8.1.12). It is an NADPH-dependent flavoenzyme that reduces trypanothione disulfide. TryR is essential for survival of these parasites both in vitro and in the human host.

A major function of trypanothione is in the defence against oxidative stress. Here, trypanothione-dependent enzymes such as tryparedoxin peroxidase (TryP) reduce peroxides using electrons donated either directly from trypanothione, or via the redox intermediate tryparedoxin (TryX). Trypanothione-dependent hydrogen peroxide metabolism is particularly important in these organisms because they lack catalase. Since the trypanosomatids also lack an equivalent of thioredoxin reductase, trypanothione reductase is the sole path that electrons can take from NADPH to these antioxidant enzymes.

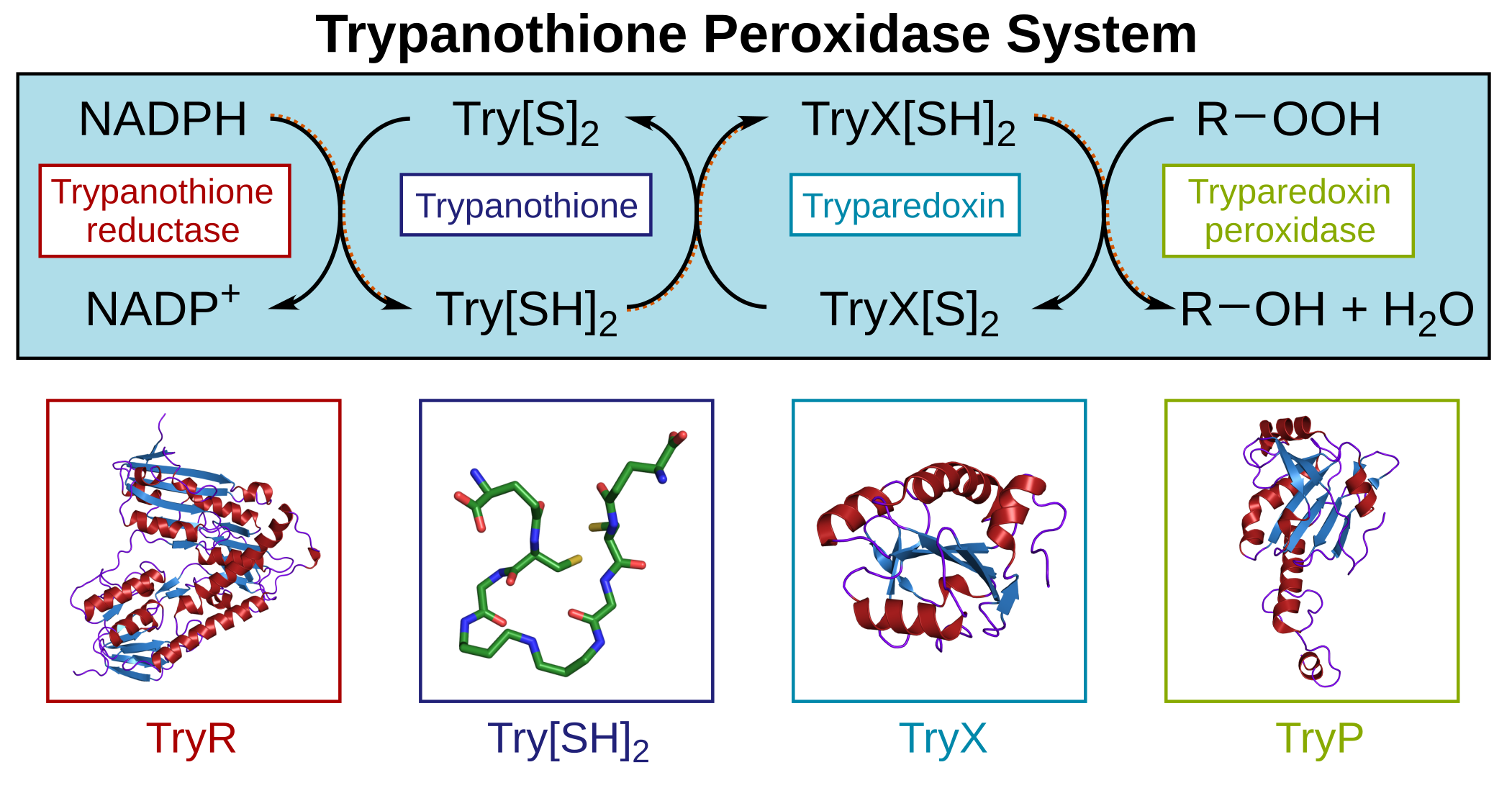
