= AngelSense =

American assistive-technology company

AngelSense Inc.
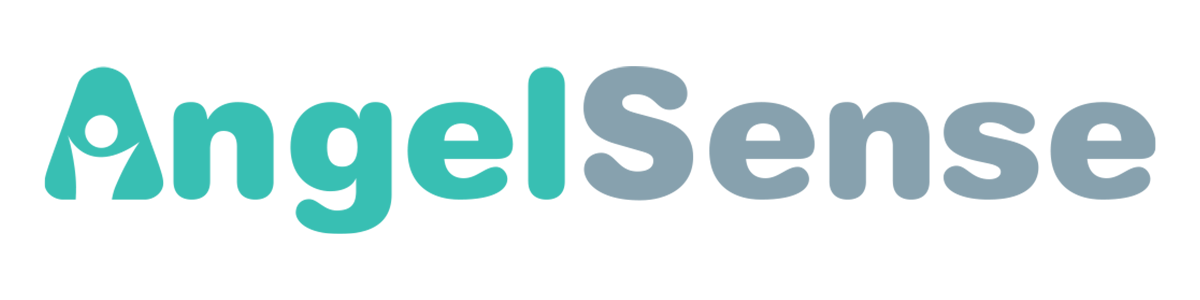
- Company type: Private
- Industry: Assistive technology
- Founded: 2013
- Founders: Doron Somer; Nery Ben-Azar
- Headquarters: United States
- Products: GPS tracking devices, two-way audio devices
- Website: angelsense.com

AngelSense Inc. is an American assistive technology company that develops GPS location and two-way audio devices for people with autism, other disabilities, and dementia, and is headquartered in New Jersey, United States.

AngelSense devices are used by families and by law-enforcement programs in a number of U.S. jurisdictions running initiatives for at-risk missing persons.

== History ==
AngelSense was founded in 2013 by entrepreneurs Doron Somer and Nery Ben-Azar, based on their experiences with autistic family members, to provide caregivers with locating and communication tools.

AngelSense introduced its first device in early 2014 after development led by Somer, following safety concerns involving his autistic son. By mid-2015, it was used by assisted caregivers in the United States. The company expanded its features in subsequent years, including a smaller device iteration for families and adults with cognitive conditions.

From 2019, U.S. municipal agencies and police departments implemented grant-funded programs to distribute AngelSense units to caregivers and integrate the technology into missing-person protocols.

== Operations ==
AngelSense is based in Pine Brook, New Jersey. It provides a wearable GPS and voice-enabled device paired with a caregiver application. The technology is deployed in community safety initiatives for residents who wander because of autism, Alzheimer's disease, dementia or related conditions. County and city programs utilize the devices as part of broader vulnerable-person registries. Sheriff-office partnerships in Florida have distributed the units to families following incidents that highlighted elopement risks.
