= Nagasuma Chandra =

Indian structural biologist

- Born: Karnataka, India
- Education: Bangalore University; University of Bristol; Indian Institute of Science
- Known for: Studies on Mycobacterium tuberculosis
- Awards: 2008 N-BIOS Prize
- Scientific career
- Fields: Structural biology; biochemistry
- Workplaces: Cipla; Indian Institute of Science

Nagasuma Chandra is an Indian structural biologist, biochemist and a professor at the department of biochemistry of the Indian Institute of Science. She is known for her studies on Mycobacterium tuberculosis. The Department of Biotechnology of the Government of India awarded her the National Bioscience Award for Career Development, one of the highest Indian science awards, for her contributions to biosciences in 2008.

== Biography ==
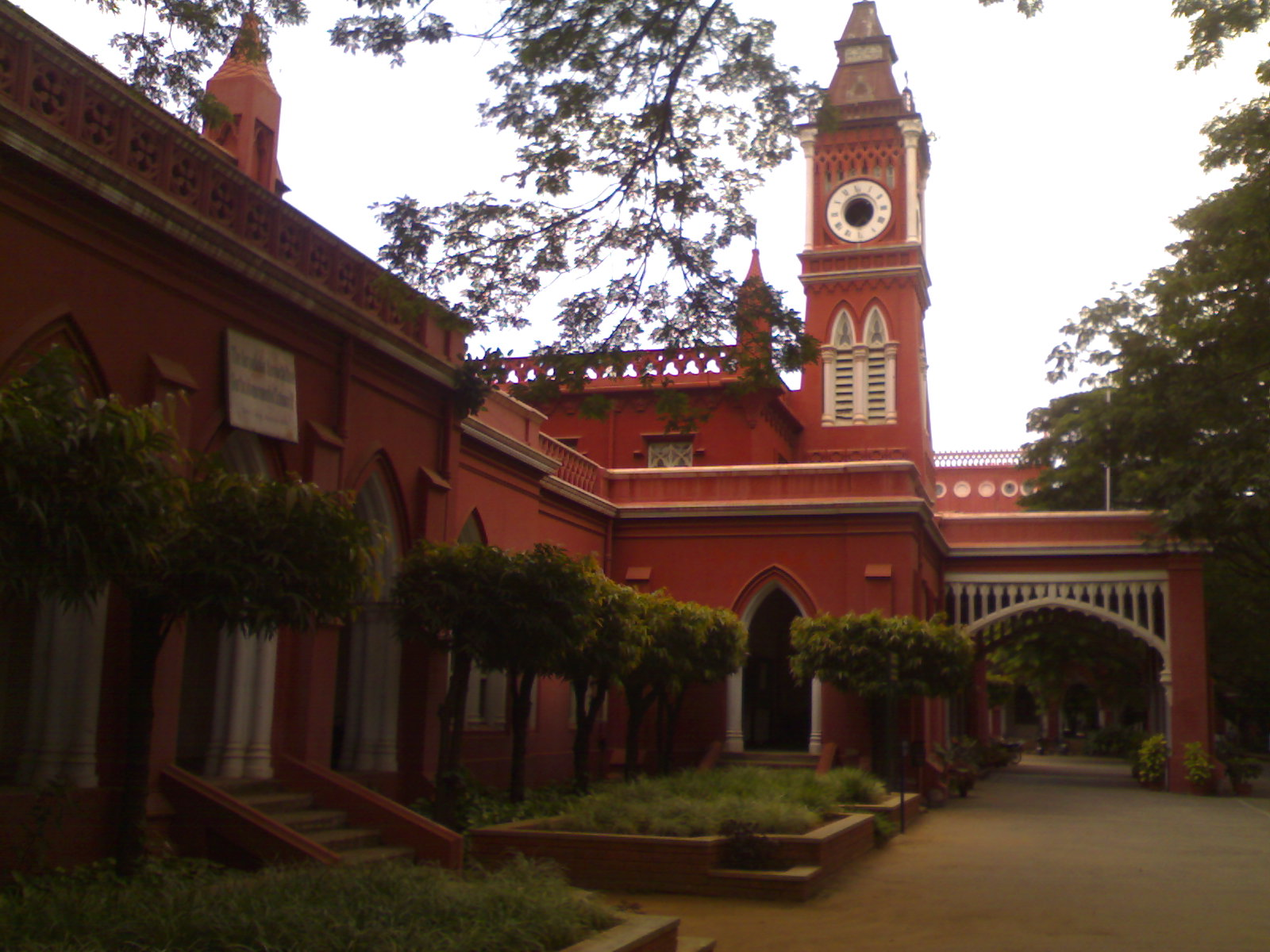
Bangalore University.

Nagasuma Chandra, born in the south Indian state of Karnataka, completed her undergraduate (BPharm) and post-graduate (MPharm) studies at the Bangalore University and moved to the UK from where she secured a PhD from the University of Bristol in 1992. She did her post-doctoral work at the Molecular Biophysics Unit (MBU) of the Indian Institute of Sciences (IISc) from 1992 to 1997 and joined IISc as a research scientist the same year. A year later, she became a faculty of bioinformatics of the institute where she holds the position of a professor. At IISc, she has set up a systems biology and computational biochemistry laboratory, popularly known as Chandralab, and hosts several research scholars. She also serves as a faculty at the National Network for Mathematical and Computational Biology, an educational agency funded by the Science and Engineering Research Board of the Government of India.

== Legacy ==
Mycobacterium tuberculosis

Chandra's research focus is in the fields of computational systems biology, cell modeling and structural bioinformatics and she leads a team of scientists who are involved in research in areas such as systems biology, computational immunology, structural bioinformatics and drug discovery. She has carried out studies on Mycobacterium tuberculosis, the causative pathogen of tuberculosis, with special emphasis on their metabolic processes and, along with M. Vijayan and K. Sekar, two of her colleagues at IISc, has developed system models which has helped identify new drug targets against the disease. In 2017, the team led by her identified three drugs namely Ebselen, Vancomycin and Phenylarsine oxide that could be used in combination with Isoniazid, the principal antibiotic used against tuberculosis, to treat the drug-resistant strains of the pathogen. The team discovered that the three drugs lowered the antioxidant levels in the bacterium and thereby destroyed its drug-resistance. Her studies have been documented by way of a number of articles (Note: Please see Selected bibliography section) and ResearchGate, an online repository of scientific articles has listed 297 of them. She has also delivered invited speeches at various seminars and conferences.

== Awards and honors ==
The Department of Biotechnology of the Government of India awarded her the National Bioscience Award for Career Development, one of the highest Indian science awards in 2008.

== Selected bibliography ==
- Bhagavat, Raghu; et al. (2018). "An Augmented Pocketome: Detection and Analysis of Small-Molecule Binding Pockets in Proteins of Known 3D Structure". Structure. 26 (3). Elsevier BV: 499–512.e2. doi:10.1016/j.str.2018.02.001. ISSN 0969-2126. PMID 29514079.
- Anand, Praveen; Chandra, Nagasuma (15 September 2014). "Characterizing the pocketome of Mycobacterium tuberculosis and application in rationalizing polypharmacological target selection". Scientific Reports. 4 (1): 6356. Bibcode:2014NatSR...4E6356A. doi:10.1038/srep06356. ISSN 2045-2322. PMC 5376175. PMID 25220818.
- Chandra, Nagasuma; Padiadpu, Jyothi (2013). "Network approaches to drug discovery". Expert Opinion on Drug Discovery. 8 (1): 7–20. doi:10.1517/17460441.2013.741119. PMID 23140510. S2CID 21595087.
- Bhagavat, Raghu; Chandra, Nagasuma (1 January 2014). "Common recognition principles across diverse sequence and structural families of sialic acid binding proteins". Glycobiology. 24 (1): 5–16. doi:10.1093/glycob/cwt063. ISSN 0959-6658. PMID 24043392.

== See also ==
- Genome analysis
- Human iron metabolism
