= SH3BGR =

Protein-coding gene in the species Homo sapiens

Identifiers
- Aliases: SH3BGR, 21-GARP, SH3 domain binding glutamate rich protein
- External IDs: OMIM: 602230; HomoloGene: 137201; GeneCards: SH3BGR; OMA:SH3BGR - orthologs

Gene location (Human)
Chr.	Chromosome 21 (human)
Band	21q22.2	Start	39,445,855 bp
Band	21q22.2	End	39,515,506 bp
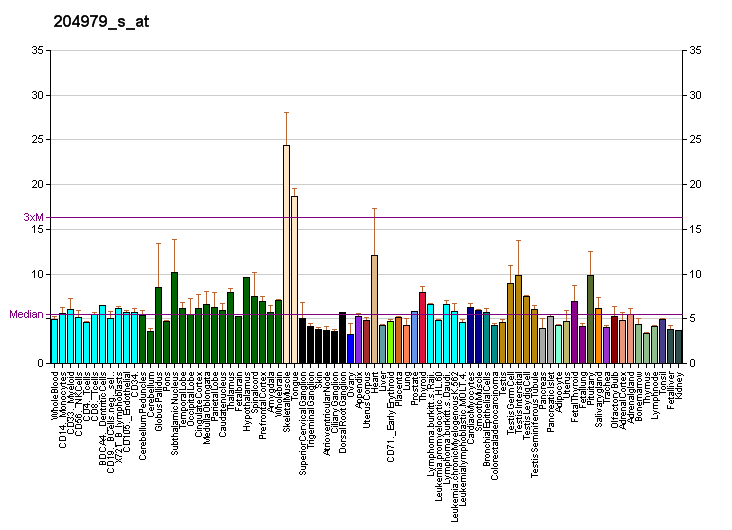
RNA expression pattern
Bgee	Human / Mouse (ortholog); Top expressed in: gastrocnemius muscle; skeletal muscle tissue; muscle of thigh; left ventricle; apex of heart; right auricle of heart; right coronary artery; ascending aorta; Descending thoracic aorta; left coronary artery / n/a; More reference expression data
BioGPS	More reference expression data
Gene ontology
Molecular function	SH3 domain binding
Cellular component	cytosol
Biological process	positive regulation of signal transduction; protein-containing complex assembly
Sources:Amigo / QuickGO
Orthologs
Species	Human	Mouse
Entrez	6450	n/a
Ensembl	ENSG00000185437	n/a
UniProt	P55822	n/a
RefSeq (mRNA)	NM_001001713; NM_007341; NM_001317740; NM_001317741; NM_001317742	n/a
RefSeq (protein)	NP_001001713; NP_001304669; NP_001304670; NP_001304671; NP_031367	n/a
Location (UCSC)	Chr 21: 39.45 – 39.52 Mb	n/a
PubMed search		n/a
- Wikidata
View/Edit Human

SH3 domain-binding glutamic acid-rich protein is a protein that in humans is encoded by the SH3BGR gene.

== See also ==
- Glutamic acid
- SH3 domain
- SH3BGRL
- SH3BGRL3
