= CRT =

CRT, crt, or Crt commonly refers to:

- Cathode ray tube, a vacuum tube that can show moving pictures, vector graphics, or lines
- Critical race theory, a conceptual framework regarding society, race, and culture

CRT, crt, or Crt may also refer to:

== Law ==
- Charitable remainder trust, United States
- Civil Resolution Tribunal, Canada
- Columbia River Treaty, Canada–United States, 1960s

== Science, technology, and mathematics ==
=== Medicine and biology ===
- Calreticulin, a protein
- Capillary refill time, for blood to refill capillaries
- Cardiac resynchronization therapy (CRT), and CRT defibrillator (CRT-D)
- Catheter-related thrombosis, the development of a blood clot related to long-term use of central venous catheters
- Certified Respiratory Therapist
- Chemoradiotherapy, chemo- and radiotherapy combined
- Cognitive Retention Therapy, for dementia
- Corneal Refractive Therapy, in optometrics
- CRT (genetics), a gene cluster

=== Social sciences ===
- Cognitive reflection test, in psychology
- Current reality tree (theory of constraints), in process management
- Culturally relevant teaching, in pedagogy

=== Technology ===
- Microsoft C Run-Time library
- SecureCRT, formerly CRT, a telnet client
- .crt, X.509 Certificate filename extension

=== Other uses in science and mathematics ===
- Chinese remainder theorem, in number theory
- Crater (constellation), in astronomy

== Transport ==
- Canal & River Trust, England and Wales
- Changchun Rail Transit, China
- Chongqing Rail Transit, China
- Connecticut River Transit, a defunct American bus service
- Cross River Tram, a defunct proposal in London, England
- CRT Group, an Australian transport company
- Chicago Rapid Transit Company, a defunct American rail company
- Colchester Rapid Transit, a rapid-transit system in Colchester, England

== Other uses ==
- Canadian Railway Troops, WWI
- Claiming Rule Teams, in motorcycle racing
- Connecticut Repertory Theatre, University of Connecticut
- Correctional Emergency Response Team
- Tochigi Broadcasting, a radio station in Tochigi Prefecture, Japan
- Iyojwaʼja Chorote language, a Matacoan language of Argentina (ISO 639 code: crt)
