= David Horn =

David Horn may refer to:

- David Bayne Horn (1901–1969), British historian
- David Horn (biologist), British biologist
- David Horn (Israeli physicist) (born 1937)
