= Sundowning =

Late day confusion syndrome common among dementia patients

Sundowning, or sundown syndrome, prevalent among people with some form of dementia, is characterized by increased confusion and restlessness beginning in the late afternoon and early evening. The term sundowning was coined by nurse Lois K. Evans in 1987 due to the association between the person's increased confusion and the setting of the sun.

For people with sundown syndrome, a multitude of behavioral problems begin to occur and are associated with long-term adverse outcomes. Sundowning seems to occur more frequently during the middle stages of Alzheimer's disease and mixed dementia and seems to subside with the progression of the person's dementia. People are generally able to understand that this behavioral pattern is abnormal. Research shows that 20–45% of people with Alzheimer's will experience some variation of sundowning confusion. However, despite lack of an official diagnosis of sundown syndrome in the Diagnostic and Statistical Manual of Mental Disorders, Fifth Edition (DSM-5), there is currently a wide range of reported prevalence.

== Relevance ==
The following social, economic, and physiological adverse outcomes are correlated with individuals affected by sundowning and their caregivers:

- Long-term admission to psychiatric care facilities.
- Prolonged hospital admission with recurrent visits that increase financial burden.
- Steeper cognitive decline in Alzheimer's disease.
- Decreased quality of life.
- Increased stress and burnout of caregivers due to the timing of sundowning symptom onset.

== Symptoms ==
Symptoms are not limited to but may include:

- Increased general confusion as natural light begins to fade and increased shadows appear.
- Agitation and mood swings. Individuals may become fairly frustrated with their own confusion as well as aggravated by noise. Individuals being found yelling and becoming increasingly upset with their caregivers are not uncommon.
- Mental and physical fatigue increase with the setting of the sun. This fatigue can play a role in the individual's irritability.
- An individual may experience an increase in restlessness while trying to sleep. Restlessness can often lead to pacing and or wandering which can be potentially harmful for an individual in a confused state.
- Hallucinations (visual and auditory) and paranoia can cause increased anxiety and resistance to care.

== Causes ==
While the specific causes of sundowning have not been empirically proven, some evidence suggests that circadian rhythm disruption increases sundowning behaviors. In humans, sunset triggers a biochemical cascade that involves a reduction of dopamine levels and a shift towards melatonin production as the body prepares for sleep. In individuals with dementia, melatonin production may be decreased, which may interrupt other neurotransmitter systems.

Other causes or precipitating factors that may lead to sundown syndrome may include hormonal changes, disturbances in REM sleep, individual and/or caregiver fatigue, inappropriate medication use, or being predisposed to behavioral disorders from chronic neurological diseases. Resources in an institution's environment can also play a role as a symptom trigger. A reduced number of staff in the evening can be attributed to more unmet needs and a lower threshold for agitation for individuals with sundown syndrome.

Sundowning should be distinguished from delirium, and could be presumed to be delirium when it appears as a new behavioral pattern until a causal link between sunset and behavioral disturbance is established. People with established sundowning and no obvious medical illness may be suffering from impaired circadian regulation, or may be affected by nocturnal aspects of their institutional environment such as shift changes, increased noise, or reduced staffing (which leads to fewer opportunities for social interaction). Delirium is generally an acute event that can span hours to days.

=== Connection to Alzheimer's disease ===
It is thought that with the development of plaques and tangles associated with Alzheimer's disease there might be a disruption within the suprachiasmatic nucleus (SCN). The SCN is located in the hypothalamus and is associated with regulating sleep patterns by maintaining circadian rhythms, which are strongly associated with external light and dark cues. A disruption within the suprachiasmatic nucleus would seem to be an area that could cause the types of confusion that are seen in sundowning. However, finding evidence for this is difficult, as an autopsy is needed to analyze this disruption properly. By the time a person experiencing Alzheimer's has died, they have usually surpassed the level of brain damage (and associated dementia) that would be associated with sundowning. This hypothesis is, however, supported by the effectiveness of melatonin, a natural hormone, to decrease behavioral symptoms associated with sundowning. The pineal gland produces melatonin when signaled by the SCN to help maintain circadian rhythms. Melatonin supplementation can be administered to older adults as their natural hormonal production decreases over time.

Serotonin has also been observed to potentially have a key role in the regulation of circadian rhythm as research has shown that serotonergic agonism in the SCN results in "phase shifts" in portions of the light-dark cycle. In addition to the effects on circadian rhythm, serotonin is also known to be involved in the regulation of aggression. Due to the serotonergic signaling deficiencies of Alzheimer's disease, it has been commonly reported that deficiencies in serotonin have been associated with worsening circadian rhythm or aggression.

=== Risk factors ===
Elderly people often experience multiple comorbidities that may contribute to the phenomenon of sundowning syndrome through neurodegeneration.

- Neurological disorders: Alzheimer's disease, Parkinson's disease, Huntington's disease, Lewy body dementia, fronto-temporal dementia, subcortical dementia.
- Neurobehavioral disorders: anxiety and depression.
- Cerebrovascular disease risk factors: hypertension, smoking, obesity.
- Genetic predisposition: presence of the ApoE4 allele has associations with sundown syndrome in people experiencing Alzheimer's disease.

== Treatment ==
Scant clinical trials exist to guide treatment. Current treatment proposals have limited justifications for their use. Treatment of sundown syndrome may vary based on when agitated behavior is observed throughout the day.

=== Non-pharmacological treatments ===
- If possible, a consistent sleeping schedule and daily routine that a patient is comfortable with can reduce confusion and agitation.
- If the person's condition permits, having increased daily activity incorporated into their schedule can help promote an earlier bedtime and need for sleep.
- Check for over-napping. People may wish to take naps during the day, but unintentionally getting too much sleep will affect nighttime sleep. Physical activity is a treatment for Alzheimer's and a way to encourage night sleep.
- Caffeine is a (fast-working) brain stimulant, but should be limited at night if a night's sleep is needed.
- Caregivers may try letting people choose their own sleeping arrangements each night, wherever they feel most comfortable sleeping, as well as allow for a dim light in the room to alleviate confusion associated with an unfamiliar place.
- Light therapy can help regulate circadian rhythms. Older adults can struggle to receive consistent sunlight due to bedrest and institutional limitations. Mood and spatial positioning improvements have been noted in people experiencing dementia with exposure to indoor light, but the evidence is currently inconclusive.
- Reducing the amount of overwhelming noise in the late afternoon or early evening can help the transition to sleep.
- Music therapy, aromatherapy, acupressure, psychosocial support, caregiver education, multi-sensory stimulation, and simulated presence therapy are possible treatment pathways, but evidence is currently lacking in clinical practice.
- Exercising at consistent times daily has been proposed to improve circadian rhythm and reduce the symptoms of sundown syndrome in people with Alzheimer's and dementia. It has also been observed that people with Alzheimer's walking in the morning or afternoon had improvements in sundowning symptoms.

=== Pharmacological treatments ===
- Some evidence supports the use of melatonin to induce sleep. The length of time required for a person to transition from fully awake to asleep has been shown to be more regular in melatonin users. Better memory and more positive emotional states have also been observed in people experiencing Alzheimer's disease.
- Drug classes such as hypnotics, benzodiazepines, acetylcholinesterase inhibitors (AChIs), N-methyl D-aspartic acid antagonists (NMDA), selective serotonin reuptake inhibitors (SSRIs), and sedative antipsychotics have been used to treat sundowning, but their side effects limit their overall effectiveness in a risk versus benefit balance. Various side effects in the risk category include increased fall risk, vivid dreams, or nocturnal agitation.

== Research directions ==
There are several pathways in the pipeline for scientists seeking therapeutic options for sundowning syndrome.

- NADH cytochrome C reductase is an enzyme involved in the synthesis of neuron energy. Stress, hypometabolism, and oxidative damage may decrease physiologic reserve in the elderly and can lead to a decrease in neuron energy production and an increase in neuron damage.
- Thioredoxin reductase is an antioxidant that neutralizes oxidative free radicals that can cause cell death. The brain is vulnerable to oxidative free radicals because it receives 20% of the human body's oxygen supply. Finding a way to maintain the thioredoxin reductase pathway can decrease plaque formation and SCN degeneration.
- Inflammatory stress in mouse models can provide a pathway for studying neurodegeneration. It is hypothesized that neurodegeneration has a relationship with inflammatory cytokines such as IL-1β. The role of cytokines in sundowning can improve our understanding of the pathology.
- Injection of chemogenetic ligands into the eye to stimulate the SCN through the retinohypothalamic tract is another possible treatment for sundown syndrome as a similar strategy has been thought to have potential with regards to therapy for mood-related disorders.

== Controversy ==
In addition to sundown syndrome not being officially recognized in the DSM-5, there is also the thought that sundown syndrome may be a phenomenon of caretakers' perception of patient agitation in the early afternoon to evening. Some studies have observed sundown syndrome occurring at times other than sunset which may suggest the symptoms associated with sundown syndrome are time-dependent rather than occurring specifically at sundown.
