= Mira Ashby =

Canadian physician (1922–2005)

Mira Ashby, CM (1922 – July 16, 2005) was the founder of Ashby House, which opened in 1978 in Toronto. Ashby House was the first community-based brain injury rehabilitation program in North America. The first transitional living program for adults with acquired brain injury, it became the model for many other programs across Canada, the US and many other parts of the world. Ashby House has changed its name to Community Head Injury Resource Services of Toronto (CHIRS) where there is still the Ashby Community Support Services. Mira Ashby received the Order of Canada in 1984 for her work on brain injury rehabilitation.

Ashby was also doctor in the Red Cross during World War II and spoke more than eight languages fluently. She died in Toronto on July 16, 2005, when she was 84 years old.

== See also ==
- Cognitive Retention Therapy
