= Simulated presence therapy =

Dementia therapy

Simulated presence therapy (SPT) is an emotion-oriented non-pharmacological intervention for people with dementia developed by P. Woods and J. Ashley in 1995. SPT was created as part of a study conducted in a nursing home where 17 individuals with the disease listened to a recording of a caregiver over a stereo. The study was originally conducted in order to combat one of the side effects of dementia such as disturbances of behavior which are called behavioral and psychological symptoms (BPSD) associated with dementia. This therapy is based on psychological attachment theories and is normally carried out by playing a recording with voices of the closest relatives of the patient in an attempt to treat BPSD in addition to reducing anxiety, decreasing challenging behavior, social isolation, or verbal aggression.

It is not clear if simulated presence therapy is effective as some research has shown the effectiveness of the therapy might depend on the attachment style of the diseased person. One study indicated simulated presence therapy was mainly effective for individuals with a secure attachment style to their loved ones or main caregivers. The researchers who conducted the states claimed those with insecure attachment styles such as anxious, avoidant, or ambivalent as these individuals tended to be more wary of the tape. It was theorized the lack of effectiveness for the therapy came from a potential lack of emotional meaning due to the attachment style or act as a reminder of the circumstances of the relationship and the absence of presence of the person in the recording. In the original study conducted by Woods and Ashley simulated therapy was most effective in the treatment of social isolation. Woods and Ashley also claim behavioral problems (i.e. blank facial expression, failure to engage in conversation or activities, restlessness, pacing, or wandering) decreased by 91%.

Simulated presence, also known as SimPres, is used to create a store of loved memories from an individual's lifetime. The creation of SimPres utilizes personalized and interactive tapes which contain a pre-recorded conversation and message discussing favorite memories full of positive emotions. The aim of simulated presence is to simulate a phone call with a loved one where the individual can have a new conversation each time the recording is played.

== See also ==
- Psychological therapies for dementia
- Sundowning
