= Naomi Feil =

German-American gerontologist (1932–2023)

- Born: July 22, 1932; Munich, Bavaria, Germany
- Died: December 24, 2023 (aged 91); Eugene, Oregon, U.S.
- Education: Columbia University (M.S.W.)
- Occupation: Social worker

Naomi Feil (July 22, 1932 – December 24, 2023) was a German-American social worker who developed validation therapy (holistic therapy that focuses on empathy and provides means for people with cognitive deficit and dementia to communicate).

== Early life and education ==
Naomi Feil was born in Munich, Germany, on July 22, 1932, and immigrated to the United States in July 1937, growing up first in New York City and then, from age 8 on, in Cleveland at the Montefiore Home for the Aged where her parents worked. Her mother was the head of the Social Service Department and her father was the administrator.

After a period of early adulthood in New York City, acting and studying theater at New York's Herbert Berghof Studio, Feil resumed her lifelong calling, acquiring a master's degree in Social Work from Columbia University and returning to Cleveland to begin her professional life at Montefiore, incorporating her natural flair for improvisation and theatrical skills into her many decades of teaching and training here and abroad, which she was still doing after moving to Eugene, Oregon, in 2015.

In November 2023, she relayed to the worldwide network of validation therapy practitioners that she had metastatic cancer. She was predeceased by her husband, educational filmmaker Edward Feil. Naomi Feil died in Eugene, Oregon, on December 24, 2023, at the age of 91.

== Career ==
Between 1963 and 1980 Naomi developed validation therapy as alternative to traditional methods of working with the severely disoriented aged people. Validation: The Feil Method was her first book published in 1982 followed by The Validation Breakthrough, which was her second, published in 1993.
