= Validation therapy =

Therapy for older people with cognitive impairments and dementia

Validation therapy was developed by Naomi Feil for older people with cognitive impairments and dementia. Feil's own approach classifies individuals with cognitive impairment as having one of four stages in a continuum of dementia. These stages are:

- Mal orientation
- Time confusion
- Repetitive motion
- Vegetative state

The basic principle of the therapy is the concept of validation or the reciprocated communication of respect which communicates that the other's opinions are acknowledged, respected, heard, and (regardless whether or not the listener actually agrees with the content), they are being treated with genuine respect as a legitimate expression of their feelings, rather than marginalized or dismissed.

Validation therapy is contrasted with reality orientation, in which the caregivers regularly remind people about their current situation (e.g., that they live in a nursing home now). It gave rise to an approach to advanced dementia called therapeutic deception, in which caregivers actively lie to protect people from re-learning distressing facts that they will be unable to remember from one day to the next (e.g., by saying that a deceased family member is sleeping right now, rather than telling them repeatedly that the loved one died).

There is insufficient scientific evidence to determine whether validation therapy reduces any of the behavioral and psychological symptoms of dementia.

Validation therapy improves job satisfaction and reduces stress for professional caregivers.

== See also ==
- Hogeweyk, a dementia facility designed to mimic everyday life

== Further research ==
- Feil, Naomi (May 1992). "Validation therapy". Geriatric Nursing. 13 (3): 129–133. doi:10.1016/S0197-4572(07)81021-4.
