= Trypanothione-disulfide reductase =

Class of enzymes

Identifiers
- EC no.: 1.8.1.12
- CAS no.: 102210-35-5

Databases
- BRENDA: enzyme data
- ExPASy: NiceZyme view
- KEGG: enzyme entry
- MetaCyc: metabolic pathway
- Rhea: reactions
- PDB structures: RCSB PDB PDBe PDBsum
- Gene Ontology: AmiGO / QuickGO
Search
- PMC: articles
- PubMed: articles
- NCBI: proteins

Trypanothione-disulfide reductase (EC 1.8.1.12) is an enzyme that catalyzes the chemical reaction

trypanothione disulfide
+ NADPH
H^{+}
H^{+}
trypanothione
+ NADP^{+}

The three substrates of this enzyme are trypanothione disulfide, reduced nicotinamide adenine dinucleotide phosphate (NADPH), and a proton. Its products are trypanothione and oxidised NADP^{+}.

This enzyme belongs to the family of oxidoreductases, specifically those acting on a sulfur group of donors with NAD+ or NADP+ as acceptor. The systematic name of this enzyme class is trypanothione:NADP+ oxidoreductase. Other names in common use include trypanothione reductase, and NADPH2:trypanothione oxidoreductase. It employs one cofactor, FAD.

The X-ray crystal structures of trypanothione reductase enzymes from several trypanosomatids species have been solved, including those from Crithidia fasciculata, Leishmania infantum, Trypanosoma brucei and Trypanosoma cruzi. The structures reveal that trypanothione reductase forms homodimers in solution with each of the two individual subunits comprising an flavin adenine dinucleotide-binding domain, an NADPH-binding domain and an interface domain. Examples of trypanothione reductase inhibitors include 5-nitroimidazole, febrifugine, imipramine and benzoxaborole.
