= PITPNB =

Protein-coding gene in the species Homo sapiens

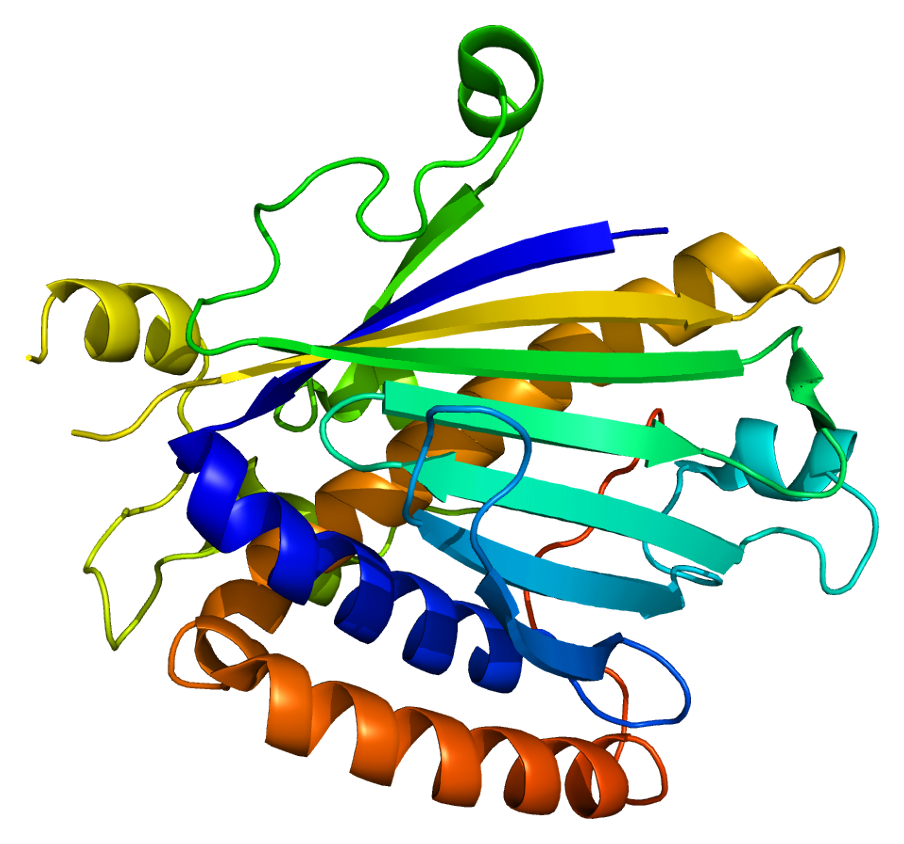

Identifiers
- Aliases: PITPNB, PI-TP-beta, PtdInsTP, VIB1B, phosphatidylinositol transfer protein beta
- External IDs: OMIM: 606876; MGI: 1927542; HomoloGene: 4533; GeneCards: PITPNB; OMA:PITPNB - orthologs

Gene location (Human)
Chr.	Chromosome 22 (human)
Band	22q12.1	Start	27,851,669 bp
Band	22q12.1	End	27,920,134 bp

Gene location (Mouse)
Chr.	Chromosome 5 (mouse)
Band	5|5 F	Start	111,478,629 bp
Band	5|5 F	End	111,536,225 bp
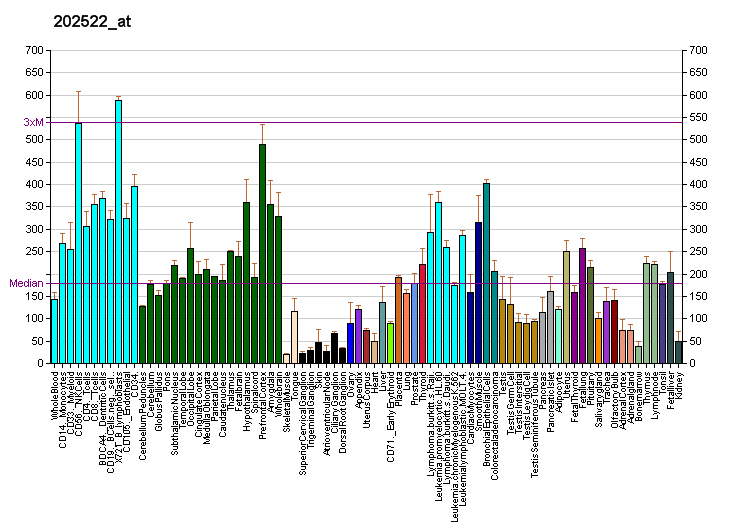
RNA expression pattern
Bgee	Human / Mouse (ortholog); Top expressed in: gingival epithelium; secondary oocyte; endothelial cell; middle temporal gyrus; germinal epithelium; Brodmann area 23; superficial temporal artery; hair follicle; cartilage tissue; parietal pleura / Top expressed in: condyle; fossa; ciliary body; hair follicle; retinal pigment epithelium; endothelial cell of lymphatic vessel; vestibular membrane of cochlear duct; conjunctival fornix; internal carotid artery; iris; More reference expression data
BioGPS	More reference expression data
Gene ontology
Molecular function	lipid binding; phosphatidylcholine transporter activity; phosphatidylinositol transfer activity; phosphatidylcholine binding; phosphatidylinositol binding; phospholipid transporter activity
Cellular component	cytoplasm; Golgi membrane; Golgi apparatus; endoplasmic reticulum membrane; intracellular anatomical structure
Biological process	lipid metabolism; retrograde vesicle-mediated transport, Golgi to endoplasmic reticulum; nucleus organization; phospholipid transport
Sources:Amigo / QuickGO
Orthologs
Species	Human	Mouse
Entrez	23760	56305
Ensembl	ENSG00000180957	ENSMUSG00000050017
UniProt	P48739	P53811
RefSeq (mRNA)	NM_001284277; NM_001284278; NM_012399	NM_001301643; NM_001301644; NM_001301666; NM_019640; NM_001359215 NM_001359216; NM_001359217
RefSeq (protein)	NP_001271206; NP_001271207; NP_036531	NP_001288572; NP_001288573; NP_001288595; NP_062614; NP_001346144 NP_001346145; NP_001346146
Location (UCSC)	Chr 22: 27.85 – 27.92 Mb	Chr 5: 111.48 – 111.54 Mb
PubMed search
- Wikidata
View/Edit Human	View/Edit Mouse

Phosphatidylinositol transfer protein beta isoform is a protein that in humans is encoded by the PITPNB gene.

The protein encoded by this gene is found in the cytoplasm, where it catalyzes the transfer of phosphatidylinositol and phosphatidylcholine between membranes.
