= TXNRD1 =

Protein-coding gene in the species Homo sapiens

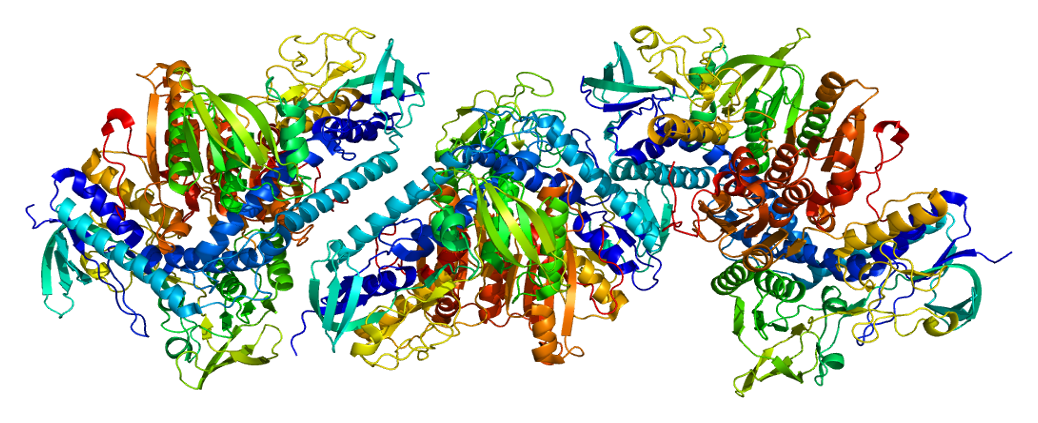

Identifiers
- Aliases: TXNRD1, GRIM-12, TR, TR1, TRXR1, TXNR, thioredoxin reductase 1
- External IDs: OMIM: 601112; MGI: 1354175; GeneCards: TXNRD1
Available structures
PDB	Ortholog search: PDBe RCSB
PDB	List of PDB id codes 2CFY, 2J3N, 2ZZ0, 2ZZB, 2ZZC, 3QFA, 3QFB
Enzyme activity
EC #	BRENDA	ExPASy	KEGG	MetaCyc
1.8.1.9	↗	↗	↗	↗
1.11.1.2	↗	↗	↗	↗

Gene location (Human)
Chr.	Chromosome 12 (human)
Band	12q23.3	Start	104,215,779 bp
Band	12q23.3	End	104,350,307 bp

Gene location (Mouse)
Chr.	Chromosome 10 (mouse)
Band	10|10 C1	Start	82,669,785 bp
Band	10|10 C1	End	82,733,546 bp
RNA expression pattern
Bgee	Human / Mouse (ortholog); Top expressed in: stromal cell of endometrium; islet of Langerhans; right adrenal gland; right adrenal cortex; left adrenal gland; left adrenal cortex; right coronary artery; pericardium; left coronary artery; nasal epithelium / Top expressed in: somite; otic placode; otic vesicle; stroma of bone marrow; primitive streak; endothelial cell of lymphatic vessel; ganglionic eminence; saccule; epiblast; gastrula; More reference expression data
BioGPS	n/a
Gene ontology
Molecular function	protein-disulfide reductase activity; methylselenol reductase activity; flavin adenine dinucleotide binding; methylseleninic acid reductase activity; protein binding; electron transfer activity; oxidoreductase activity; oxidoreductase activity, acting on a sulfur group of donors, NAD(P) as acceptor; thioredoxin-disulfide reductase activity
Cellular component	cytoplasm; extracellular exosome; nucleus; fibrillar center; nucleoplasm; mitochondrion; cytosol
Biological process	nucleobase-containing small molecule interconversion; selenium compound metabolic process; signal transduction; cellular oxidant detoxification; response to oxygen radical; cell redox homeostasis; regulation of lipid metabolic process; cellular response to oxidative stress; mesoderm formation; gastrulation; cell population proliferation; electron transport chain
Sources:Amigo / QuickGO
Orthologs
Databases	NCBI: entry; OMA: entry
Species	Human	Mouse
Entrez	7296	50493
Ensembl	ENSG00000198431	ENSMUSG00000020250
UniProt	Q16881	Q9JMH6
RefSeq (mRNA)	NM_182743; NM_001093771; NM_001261445; NM_001261446; NM_003330 NM_182729; NM_182742	NM_001042513; NM_001042514; NM_001042523; NM_015762
RefSeq (protein)	NP_001087240; NP_001248374; NP_001248375; NP_003321; NP_877393 NP_877419; NP_877420	NP_001035978; NP_001035979; NP_001035988; NP_056577
Location (UCSC)	Chr 12: 104.22 – 104.35 Mb	Chr 10: 82.67 – 82.73 Mb
PubMed search
- Wikidata
View/Edit Human	View/Edit Mouse

Thioredoxin reductase 1, cytoplasmic is an enzyme that in humans is encoded by the TXNRD1 gene.

This gene encodes a member of the family of pyridine nucleotide oxidoreductases. This protein reduces thioredoxins as well as other substrates, and plays a role in selenium metabolism and protection against oxidative stress. The functional enzyme is thought to be a homodimer which uses FAD as a cofactor. Each subunit contains a selenocysteine (Sec) residue which is required for catalytic activity. The selenocysteine is encoded by the UGA codon that normally signals translation termination. The 3' UTR of selenocysteine-containing genes have a common stem-loop structure, the sec insertion sequence (SECIS), that is necessary for the recognition of UGA as a Sec codon rather than as a stop signal. Alternative splicing results in several transcript variants encoding the same or different isoforms.

== See also ==
- Thioredoxin reductase
