= Alan Fairlamb =

British biochemist (born 1947)

Trypanothione. The glutathione moieties are shown in black and the spermidine linker in red.

Alan Hutchinson Fairlamb, CBE, FRSE, FLS, FMedSci, FRSB (born 30 April 1947, Newcastle upon Tyne, England) is a Wellcome Trust Principal Research Fellow and Professor of Biochemistry in the Division of Biological Chemistry and Drug Discovery at the School of Life Sciences, University of Dundee, Scotland. From 2006-2011 he was a member of the Scientific and Technical Advisory Committee of the Special Programme for Research and Training in Tropical Diseases (TDR) -- an independent global programme of scientific collaboration co-sponsored by UNICEF, UNDP, the World Bank and WHO. Currently he is a member of the governing board of the Tres Cantos Open Lab Foundation, whose aim is to accelerate the discovery and development of medicines to tackle diseases of the developing world in an open collaborative manner.

Fairlamb and his team have studied the protozoan parasites causing three different diseases - sleeping sickness, Chagas disease and leishmaniasis. He was one of the 250 scientists involved in the genome sequencing of these parasites.

In 1985, Fairlamb discovered a unique thiol compound present in these parasites, and named it trypanothione. This thiol metabolite is quite different from its human equivalent, glutathione. Trypanothione allows the parasites to fend off free radicals and other toxic oxidants produced by the immune system of the infected patient, and was shown to be vital for parasite survival and virulence. For instance, antimonials neutralize the Leishmania parasite's antioxidant defence system, allowing the patient to clear the infection. Studies on the effect of drugs on trypanothione metabolism resulted in the discovery that fexinidazole is a potential oral treatment for visceral leishmaniasis.

In 2006 Fairlamb and Mike Ferguson became co-directors of the Drug Discovery Unit at the University of Dundee. The new centre, opened in 2005, has facilities for high-throughput screening and medicinal chemistry. These will take the drug discovery/development process further than any other UK university, to a stage where pharmaceutical companies will have sufficient data to move into the production stage.
