= Cognitive retention therapy =

Cognitive therapy for dementia

Cognitive retention therapy (CRT), also known as the Ashby Memory Method, is a cognitive therapy for dementia, adapted from Mira Ashby's programs for brain injury rehabilitation, for which she won the Order of Canada in 1984. CRT is a specifically tailored program to address the damage caused by Alzheimer's disease and other dementia. Combining word exercises, visual stimulation, a process called errorless learning, Stroop exercises and many other techniques from Ashby's research, CRT creates personalized activities based on participant's interests to stimulate all 5 senses. CRT is undergoing formal clinical studies, and has been presented at different seminars and conventions including the 28th National Conference of the Alzheimer Society of Canada in Toronto, Ontario; and as of 2011 had received positive feedback as a plausible treatment option.
