= Phenylarsine oxide =

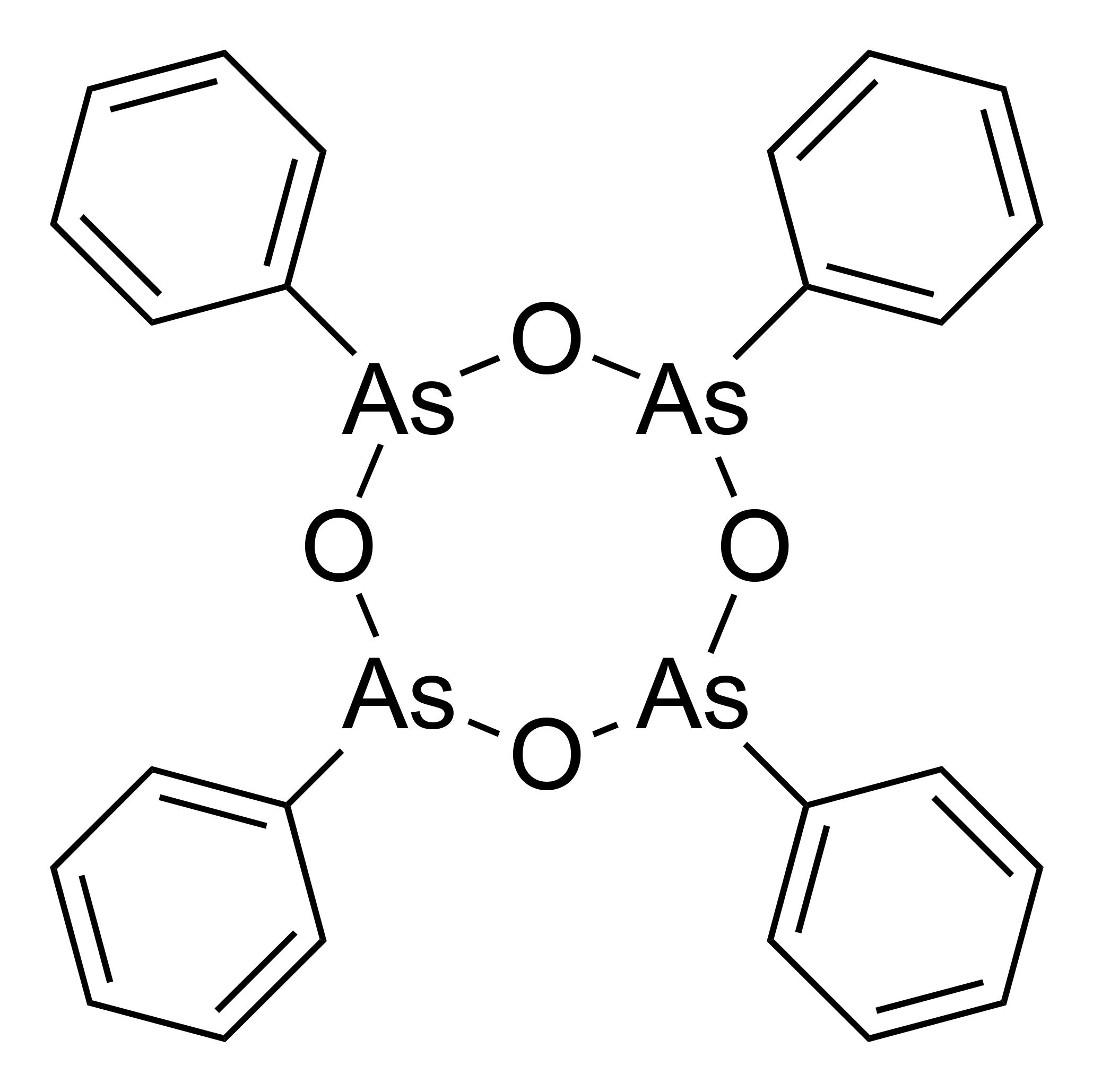

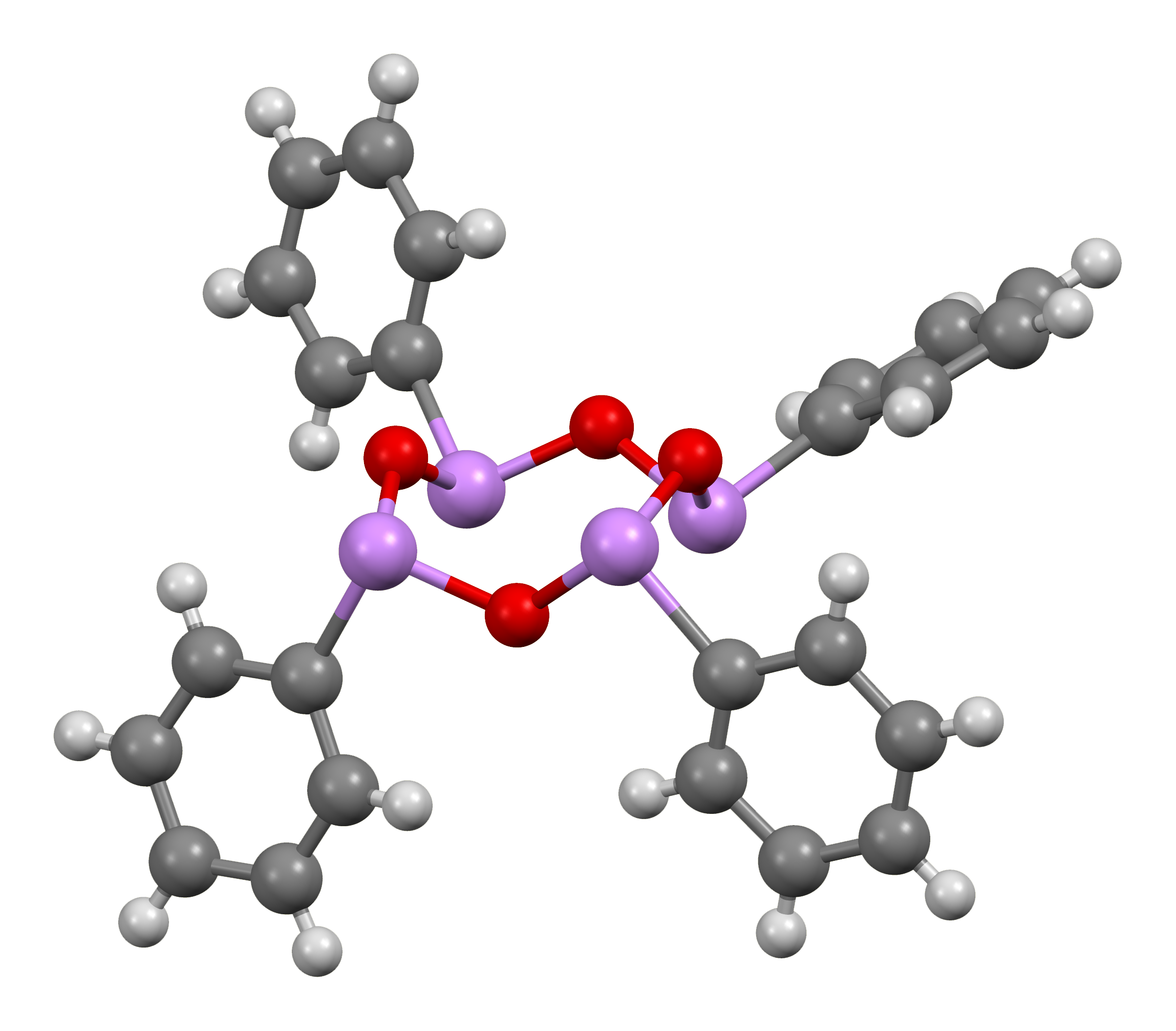

Names
- IUPAC name Oxo(phenyl)arsine
- Other names Phenyl arsenoxide; Oxo(phenyl)arsane

Identifiers
CAS Number	637-03-6
3D model (JSmol)	Interactive image
ChEBI	CHEBI:75253
ChEMBL	ChEMBL477683
ChemSpider	4931050
ECHA InfoCard	100.010.251
EC Number	211-275-3
PubChem CID	4778
UNII	0HUR2WY345
CompTox Dashboard (EPA)	DTXSID5042249
- InChI: InChI=1S/C6H5AsO/c8-7-6-4-2-1-3-5-6/h1-5H Key: BQVCCPGCDUSGOE-UHFFFAOYSA-N
- SMILES: c1ccc(cc1)[As]=O

Properties
Chemical formula	C_{6}H_{5}AsO
Molar mass	168.027 g·mol^{−1}

Hazards
- GHS labelling
Pictograms	(GHS06: Toxic) (GHS09: Environmental hazard)
Signal word	Danger
Hazard statements	H301, H331, H410
Precautionary statements	P261, P264, P270, P271, P273, P301+P310, P304+P340, P311, P321, P330, P391, P403+P233, P405, P501
- Except where otherwise noted, data are given for materials in their standard state (at 25 °C [77 °F], 100 kPa). Infobox references

Phenylarsine oxide (PAO or PhAsO) is an organometallic compound with the empirical formula C_{6}H_{5}AsO. It contains a phenyl group and an oxygen atom both bonded to an arsenic atom.

== Structure ==
Despite its simple empirical formula, phenylarsine oxide does not contain an As=O double bond. In common with other compounds with the general formula RAsO, PhAsO forms a cyclic oligomer. A range of ring sizes are possible, but PhAsO crystallizes as the tetramer, cyclo-(PhAsO)_{4}. RAsO compounds form these species because for heavy elements such as arsenic, two single bonds to oxygen are more stable than one double bond; see double bond rule for details.

== Use in biochemical research ==
The arsenic atom in PAO has a high affinity for the sulfur atom of thiols in organic compounds, in particular, forming stable complexes with vicinal cysteine residues in protein structures. This effect makes it useful for studying ligand–receptor binding This binding affinity also makes PAO useful for affinity chromatography by immobilizing it on a resin. It has a high selectivity for structures with vicinal cysteines rather than single cysteine residues or cystine (a disulfide-bridged pair of cysteine residues).

== Use in wastewater analysis ==
Phenylarsine oxide is a reducing agent that is stable in water. As such, solutions of it can be used in iodometric methods for the determination of residual chlorine (Cl^{+}) in wastewaters. The accuracy of these methods is enough that the residual chlorine can often be detected to low ppm levels.
