= David Horn (biologist) =

- Born: Shoreham-by-Sea, England
- Education: University of Dundee
- Known for: Research on the African trypanosome, Trypanosoma brucei
- Awards: William Trager Award for Basic Parasitology (2019) Fellow of the Royal Society of Edinburgh (2017) C.A. Wright Memorial Medal (2016) Wellcome Trust Senior Investigator Awards (2013 and 2019)
- Website: http://www.lifesci.dundee.ac.uk/groups/david-horn/

David Horn FRSE, is a Wellcome Trust Senior Investigator, professor of parasite molecular biology, deputy head of the Division of Biological Chemistry and Drug Discovery and deputy director of the Wellcome Trust Centre for Anti-Infectives Research in the School of Life Sciences, University of Dundee. His research is focused on antigenic variation, drug action and resistance and the application of genetic screens to African trypanosomes: parasitic protists that cause sleeping sickness or Human African Trypanosomiasis (HAT) and the livestock disease, nagana.

== Education and career ==
Horn was educated at King's College London, where he was awarded a Bachelor of Science degree in 1989. He was awarded a PhD in molecular biology from University College London in 1993. Then he joined the Rockefeller University, US, as a postdoctoral associate from 1993 to 1997. Between 1997 and 2013 he held various positions at the London School of Hygiene and Tropical Medicine before joining the faculty at the University of Dundee.

== Research ==
Horn's research aims to understand the genetics and molecular biology of parasites responsible for Sleeping sickness, or Human African Trypanosomiasis (HAT) as well as Chagas disease and leishmaniasis. He and his team have identified a protein termed 'VSG exclusion' or VEX-complex. This is responsible for the parasite's antigenic variability as it permits the change of the surface protein coat on the parasite which permits the parasite to shield itself from the host's immune system.

His team has also developed a high-throughput RNA Interference Target sequencing (RIT-seq) approach, which allows for the exploitation of genome sequence data, to help prioritise drug targets. This research is critical as there are no vaccines and, left untreated, sleeping sickness is typically fatal.

Horn and his team have discovered over 50 genes connected to drug action and resistance. Of these, they identified a gene which explains arsenic-based drug resistance in patients from Sudan and the Democratic Republic of the Congo. .

== Awards and honours ==
David Horn was awarded the C.A. Wright Memorial Medal from the British Society for Parasitology in 2016.

He was elected a Fellow of Scotland's National Academy by the Royal Society of Edinburgh in 2017.

He received a £2.1 million Investigator Award from the Wellcome Trust in 2019.

He was awarded the William Trager Award by the American Society of Tropical Medicine in 2019.

He was elected a Fellow of the Academy of Medical Sciences in 2025.
