= Glutaredoxin =

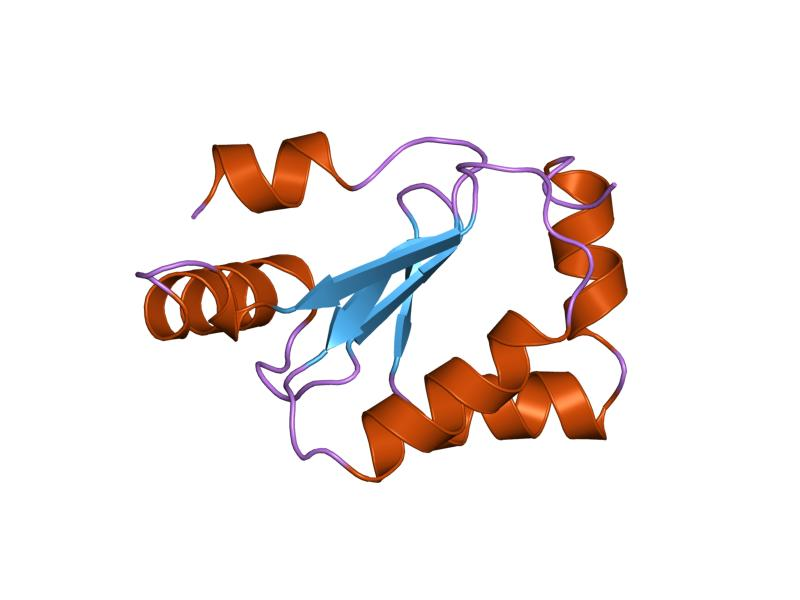

Identifiers
- Symbol: Glutaredoxin
- Pfam: PF00462
- Pfam clan: CL0172
- InterPro: IPR002109
- PROSITE: PDOC00173
- SCOP2: 1kte / SCOPe / SUPFAM
- OPM superfamily: 131
- OPM protein: 1z9h
- CDD: cd02066
Available protein structures:
- PDB: IPR002109 PF00462 (ECOD; PDBsum)
- AlphaFold: IPR002109; PF00462

Glutaredoxins (also known as Thioltransferase) are small redox enzymes of approximately one hundred amino-acid residues that use glutathione as a cofactor. In humans this oxidation repair enzyme is also known to participate in many cellular functions, including redox signaling and regulation of glucose metabolism. Glutaredoxins are oxidized by substrates, and reduced non-enzymatically by glutathione. In contrast to thioredoxins, which are reduced by thioredoxin reductase, no oxidoreductase exists that specifically reduces glutaredoxins. Instead, glutaredoxins are reduced by the oxidation of glutathione. Reduced glutathione is then regenerated by glutathione reductase. Together these components compose the glutathione system.

Like thioredoxin, which functions in a similar way, glutaredoxin possesses an active centre disulfide bond. It exists in either a reduced or an oxidized form where the two cysteine residues are linked in an intramolecular disulfide bond. Glutaredoxins function as electron carriers in the glutathione-dependent synthesis of deoxyribonucleotides by the enzyme ribonucleotide reductase. Moreover, GRX act in antioxidant defense by reducing dehydroascorbate, peroxiredoxins, and methionine sulfoxide reductase. Beside their function in antioxidant defense, bacterial and plant GRX were shown to bind iron-sulfur clusters and to deliver the cluster to enzymes on demand.

== In viruses ==
Glutaredoxin has been sequenced in a variety of viruses. On the basis of extensive sequence similarity, it has been proposed that Vaccinia virus protein O2L is, it seems, a glutaredoxin. Bacteriophage T4 thioredoxin seems to be evolution-related. In position 5 of the pattern T4, thioredoxin has Val instead of Pro.

== In plants ==
Approximately 30 GRX isoforms are described in the model plant Arabidopsis thaliana and 48 in Oryza sativa L. According to their redox-active centre, they are subgrouped in six classes of the CSY[C/S]-, CGFS-, CC-type and 3 groups with additional domains of unknown function. The CC-type GRXs are only found in higher plants. In Arabidopsis, GRXs are involved in flower development and Salicylic acid signalling.

== Subfamilies ==
- Glutaredoxin subgroup InterPro: IPR014025

== Human proteins containing this domain ==
GLRX; GLRX2; GLRX3; GLRX5; PTGES2
