= SH3BGRL =

Protein-coding gene in the species Homo sapiens

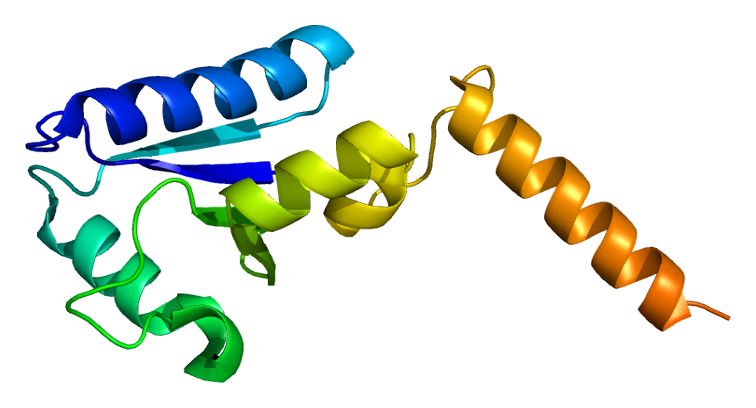
Available structures
PDB	Ortholog search: PDBe RCSB
PDB	List of PDB id codes 1U6T, 1WRY

Identifiers
- Aliases: SH3BGRL, HEL-S-115, SH3BGR, SH3 domain binding glutamate rich protein like
- External IDs: OMIM: 300190; MGI: 1930849; HomoloGene: 2275; GeneCards: SH3BGRL; OMA:SH3BGRL - orthologs

Gene location (Human)
Chr.	X chromosome (human)
Band	Xq21.1	Start	81,202,102 bp
Band	Xq21.1	End	81,298,547 bp

Gene location (Mouse)
Chr.	X chromosome (mouse)
Band	X|X D	Start	108,138,971 bp
Band	X|X D	End	108,241,479 bp
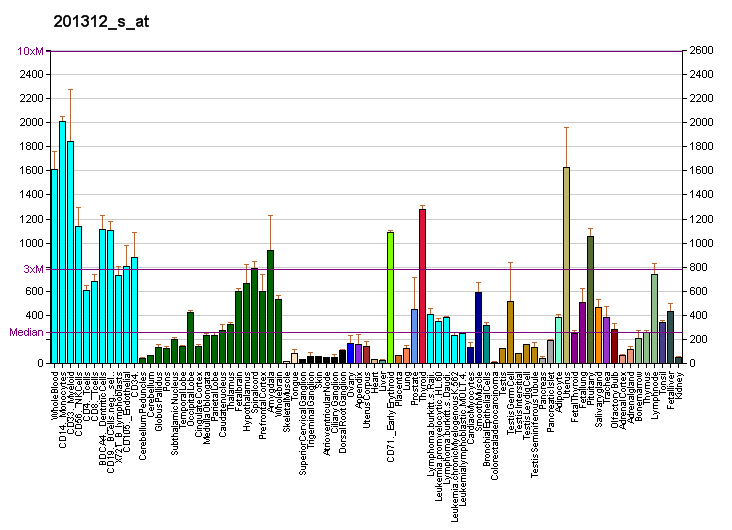

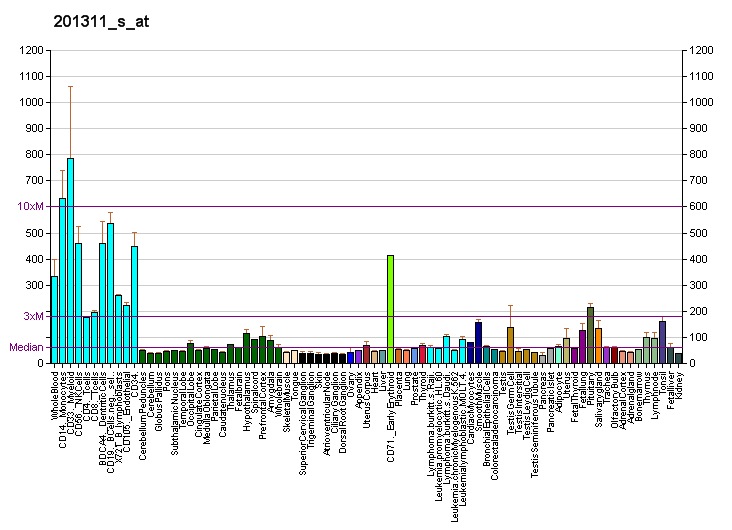
RNA expression pattern
Bgee	Human / Mouse (ortholog); Top expressed in: seminal vesicula; tail of epididymis; monocyte; superficial temporal artery; saphenous vein; trabecular bone; urethra; lactiferous duct; germinal epithelium; popliteal artery / Top expressed in: medial ganglionic eminence; tunica media of zone of aorta; ascending aorta; olfactory epithelium; Epithelium of choroid plexus; aortic valve; carotid body; left lung lobe; calvaria; submandibular gland; More reference expression data
BioGPS	More reference expression data
Gene ontology
Molecular function	SH3 domain binding
Cellular component	cytoplasm; extracellular exosome; nucleus; extracellular space
Biological process	positive regulation of signal transduction
Sources:Amigo / QuickGO
Orthologs
Species	Human	Mouse
Entrez	6451	56726
Ensembl	ENSG00000131171	ENSMUSG00000031246
UniProt	O75368	Q9JJU8
RefSeq (mRNA)	NM_003022	NM_019989
RefSeq (protein)	NP_003013	NP_064373
Location (UCSC)	Chr X: 81.2 – 81.3 Mb	Chr X: 108.14 – 108.24 Mb
PubMed search
- Wikidata
View/Edit Human	View/Edit Mouse

SH3 domain-binding glutamic acid-rich-like protein is a protein that in humans is encoded by the SH3BGRL gene.
