= Wandering (dementia) =

Common behavior in people with dementia

Wandering occurs when a person with dementia roams around and becomes lost or confused about their location. It is a common behavior that can cause great risk for the person, and is often the major priority (and concern) for caregivers. It is estimated to be the most common form of disruption from people with dementia within institutions. Although it occurs in several types of dementia, wandering is especially common in people with Alzheimer's disease. People with dementia often wander because they are stressed, looking for someone or something, attending to basic needs, engaging in past routines, or with visual-spatial problems. Other times, they may wander without any clear reason.

== Elopement ==
Elopement, or unattended wandering that goes out of bounds, is a special concern for caregivers and search and rescue responders. Wandering (especially if combined with sundowning) can result in the person being lost outdoors at night, dressed inappropriately, and unable to take many ordinarily routine steps to ensure their personal safety and security. This is a situation of great urgency, and the necessity of searching at night imposes added risks on the searchers.

In some countries the social costs of elopement, already significant, are increasing rapidly. A search and rescue mission lasting more than a few hours is likely to expend many hundreds to thousands to tens of thousands of skilled worker hours and, per mission, those involving subjects with dementia typically expend significantly more resources than others.

== Assessment ==
Assessment of a person's risk of wandering is often neglected. A review of medical records of 83 people with dementia living in Los Angeles found that only 8% of the records included a wandering risk assessment. Assessment can be performed by a social worker. In the United States, the Alzheimer's Association has developed a program called "Safe Return" that includes assessment tools. An assessment tool designed for use in nursing homes is the Revised Algase Wandering Scale-Nursing Home Version; this tool may be suitable for use in assisted living facilities.

== Prevention ==
The most common form of wandering prevention is for a caregiver to remain in the company of the person likely to wander, so the caregiver can either accompany them or prevent them from wandering.

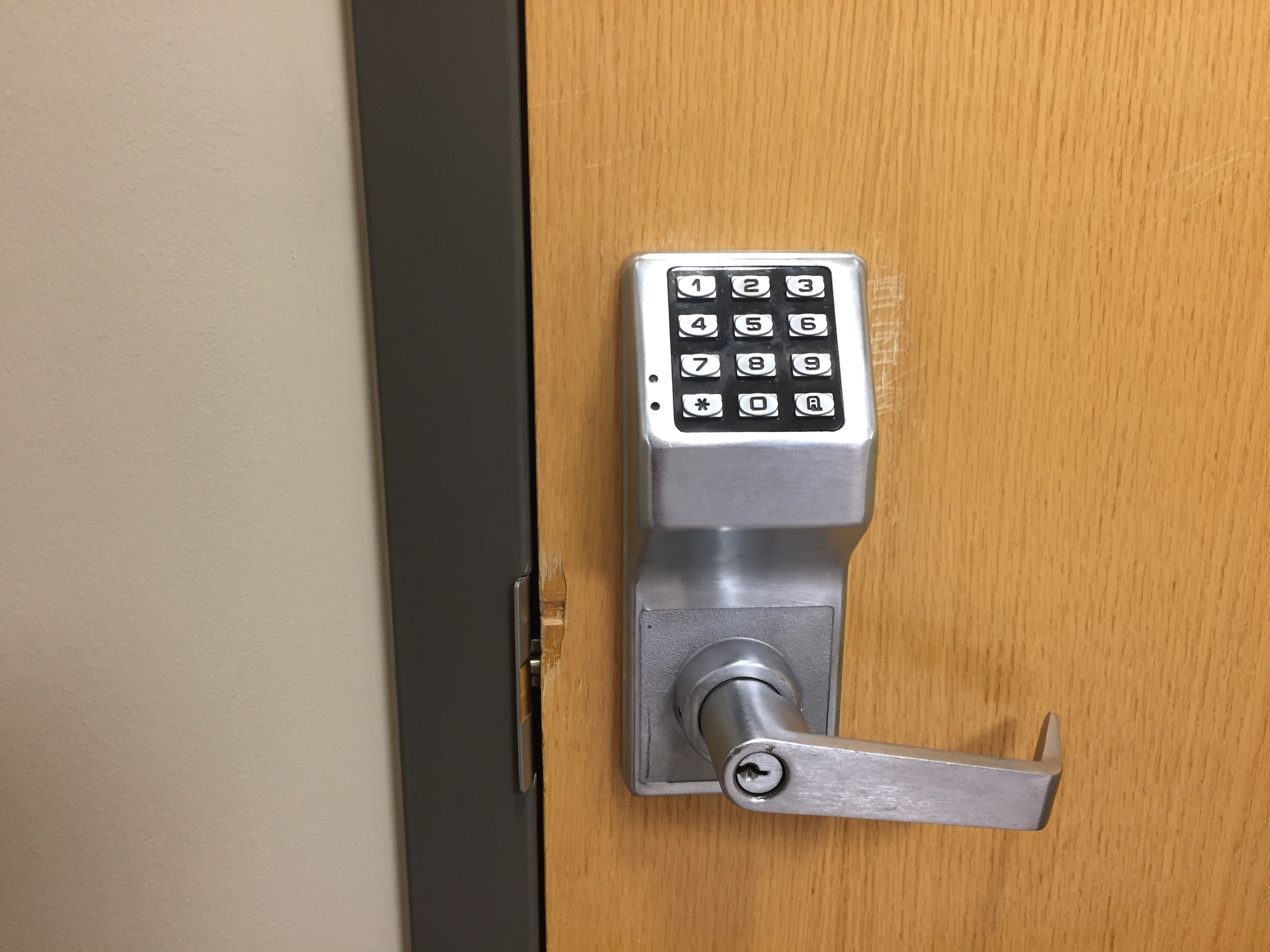
Locked doors can keep people from entering unsafe places or leaving a building without supervision.

Other methods used to prevent wandering, or simply to reduce the risk of wandering, may include sedative drugs, physical restraints, physical barriers, 24-hour real-time surveillance, or tracking devices. The ethics of some methods have been frequently called into question; the use of physical restraints, for example, is widely considered to be inhumane. Tracking devices of several kinds have been evaluated.

Much of the literature on wandering concerns institutional residents. Studies on wandering from private residences are insufficient for comparison of prevention via drugs versus other methods.

The risk of wandering can be reduced by several low-tech and minimally intrusive techniques. For example, placing a visual barrier such as a curtain or a black area rug across a doorway may mimic a hole, thus discouraging elopement behaviors.

Wandering can be due to a person searching for stimulation. If a wanderer does not purposefully attempt to escape the location where they are, a minimal barrier can deter wandering behaviour. However, some wanderers will look for a familiar route, place, or area from their past, while others will simply "explore".

Some cases of wanderers operating vehicles and driving either aimlessly or along a familiar route, road, or highway have been reported.

In response to wandering seniors, 25 states in the US have adopted Silver Alert programs. Silver Alert is similar to Amber alert to notify the public of missing seniors with dementia and other cognitive disabilities.

== Technology ==
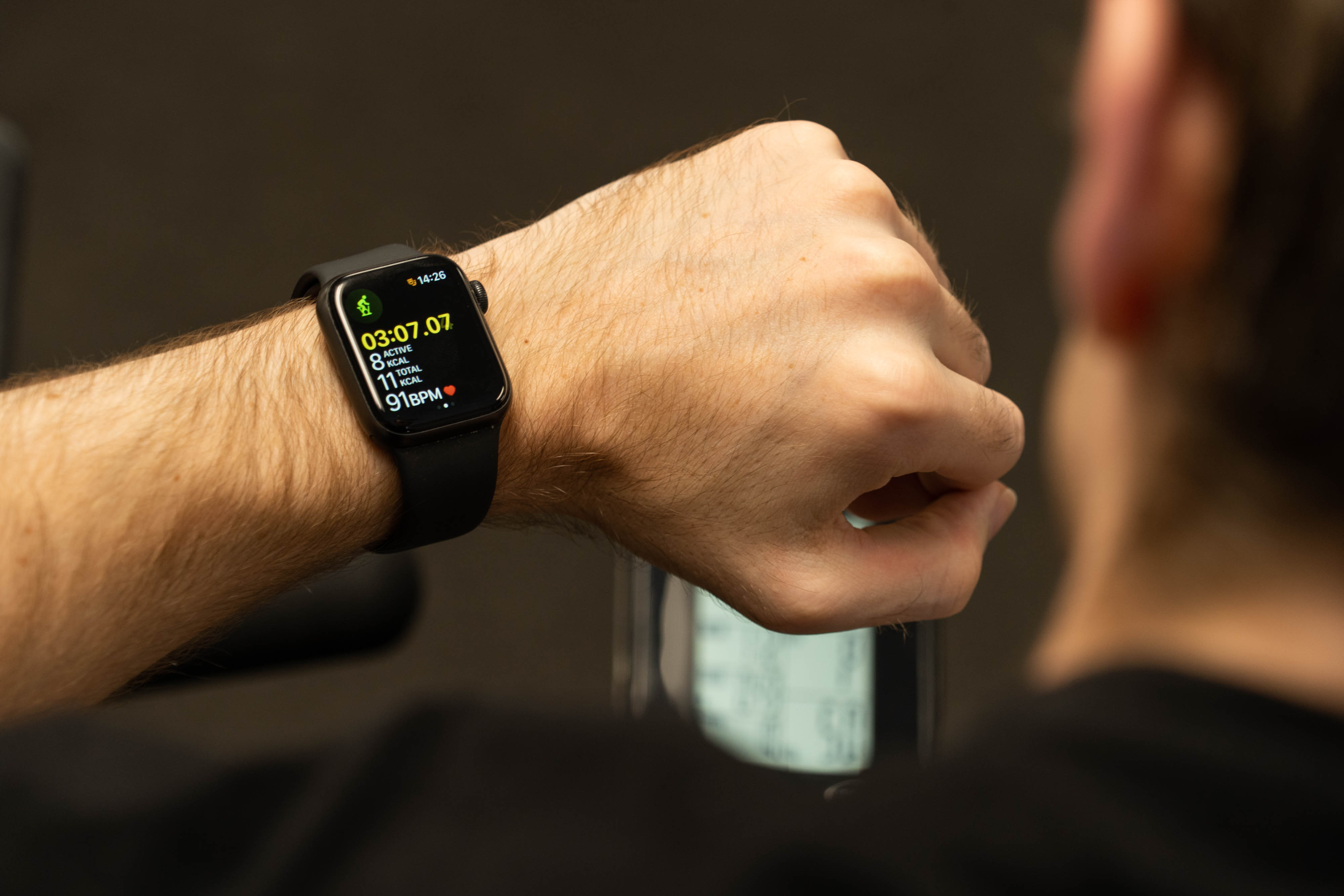
Smart watches and other devices can be used to track a person's location.

In other efforts to help keep residents safe, mitigate liability, long term care and assisted living facilities may use radio-frequency identification (RFID) products to protect their residents. A resident wears a wrist, pendant, or ankle transmitter. This RFID tag can be read by receiving antenna units, which are placed usually at door or hallway locations that are deemed likely routes of egress and need monitoring. The system will then either sound an alarm or briefly lock a door when a door monitor reads a transmitter worn by a resident that is at risk for wandering. This helps prevent an elopement as staff can be notified by alarms at the door, pocket pagers, and email. A caregiver will be able to quickly find the person at risk and keep them safely inside. Smaller scale versions of this technology are also used in private residences.

Newer versions of this equipment have become more advanced. The newest types of systems may have the ability to: identify a RFID tag by a specific resident and forward that name to the staff; give staff a last known location of the resident; show a photo of the resident at the staff station with a mapped out door location; report the frequency, times and severity of the incidents; and finally, integrate with other access control systems, heating, ventilation, and air conditioning, fire alarm equipment and phone equipment.

This type of system seems to be preferable because it helps monitor those at risk for wandering and elopement while not infringing on the freedom of other residents or visitors to a facility.

== See also ==
- Fugue state
