= Thioredoxin reductase =

Class of enzymes

Thioredoxin reductase (low molecular weight)

Identifiers
- Symbol: ?
- InterPro: IPR005982
- PROSITE: PS00573
- SCOP2: 1zof / SCOPe / SUPFAM

Thioredoxin/glutathione reductase selenoprotein (high molecular weight)

Identifiers
- Symbol: ?
- InterPro: IPR006338
- PROSITE: PS00573
- SCOP2: 3dgh / SCOPe / SUPFAM

Thioredoxin reductases (TR, TrxR) (EC 1.8.1.9) are enzymes that reduce thioredoxin (Trx). Two classes of thioredoxin reductase have been identified: one class in bacteria and some eukaryotes and one in animals. Bacterial TrxR also catalyzes the reduction of glutaredoxin like proteins known as NrdH. Both classes are flavoproteins which function as homodimers. Each monomer contains a FAD prosthetic group, a NADPH binding domain, and an active site containing a redox-active disulfide bond.

== Cellular role ==
Thioredoxin reductases are enzymes that catalyze the reduction of thioredoxin and hence they are a central component in the thioredoxin system. Together with thioredoxin (Trx) and NADPH this system's most general description is as a system for reducing disulfide bonds in cells. Electrons are taken from NADPH via TrxR and are transferred to the active site of Trx, which goes on to reduce protein disulfides or other substrates. The Trx system exists in all living cells and has an evolutionary history tied to DNA as a genetic material, defense against oxidative damage due to oxygen metabolism, and redox signaling using molecules like hydrogen peroxide and nitric oxide.

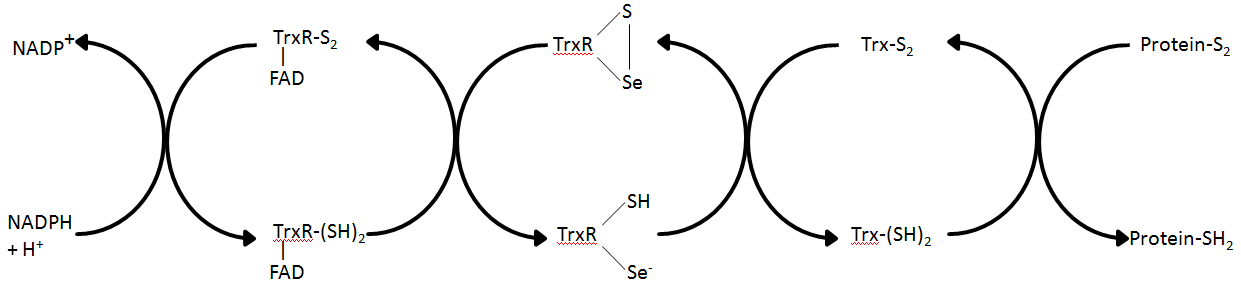
Schematic diagram of TrxR's cellular role Adapted from Holmgren et al.

== Diversity ==
Two classes of thioredoxin reductase have evolved independently from a shared ancestor of the FAD/NAD(P)-binding domain superfamily (IPR036188):

- A high molecular weight (MW = ~55,000) type containing a selenocysteine residue in its active site has been identified in higher eukaryotes including humans. This TxR is related to glutathione reductase, trypanothione reductase, mercuric reductase and lipoamide dehydrogenase. In the following text we use the example of the mammalian version.
- A low molecular weight (MW = ~ 35,000) type has been identified in archaea, bacteria and other eukarya. It is related to AhpF, a alkyl hydroperoxide reductase. In the following text we use the example of the E. coli version.

These two classes of TrxR have only ~20% sequence identity in the section of primary sequence where they can be reliably aligned. The net reaction of both classes of TrxR is identical but the mechanism of action of each is distinct.

Humans express three thioredoxin reductase isozymes: thioredoxin reductase 1 (TrxR1, cytosolic), thioredoxin reductase 2 (TrxR2, mitochondrial), thioredoxin reductase 3 (TrxR3, testis specific). Each isozyme is encoded by a separate gene:

thioredoxin reductase 1

Identifiers
- Symbol: TXNRD1
- NCBI gene: 7296
- HGNC: 12437
- OMIM: 601112
- RefSeq: NM_003330
- UniProt: Q16881

Other data
- EC number: 1.8.1.9
- Locus: Chr. 12 q23-q24.1
Search for
- Structures: Swiss-model
- Domains: InterPro

thioredoxin reductase 2

Identifiers
- Symbol: TXNRD2
- NCBI gene: 10587
- HGNC: 18155
- OMIM: 606448
- RefSeq: NM_006440
- UniProt: Q9NNW7

Other data
- EC number: 1.8.1.9
- Locus: Chr. 22 q11.21
Search for
- Structures: Swiss-model
- Domains: InterPro

thioredoxin reductase 3

Identifiers
- Symbol: TXNRD3
- NCBI gene: 114112
- HGNC: 20667
- OMIM: 606235
- RefSeq: XM_051264
- UniProt: Q86VQ6

Other data
- EC number: 1.8.1.9
- Locus: Chr. 3 p13-q13.33
Search for
- Structures: Swiss-model
- Domains: InterPro

== Structure ==
=== E. coli ===
In E. coli ThxR there are two binding domains, one for FAD and another for NADPH. The connection between these two domains is a two-stranded anti-parallel β-sheet. Each domain individually is very similar to the analogous domains in glutathione reductase and lipoamide dehydrogenase, but the relative orientation of these domains in ThxR is rotated by 66 degrees. This becomes significant in the mechanism of action described below. ThxR homo-dimerizes with the interface between the two monomers formed by three alpha-helices and two loops. Each monomer can separately bind a molecule of thioredoxin.

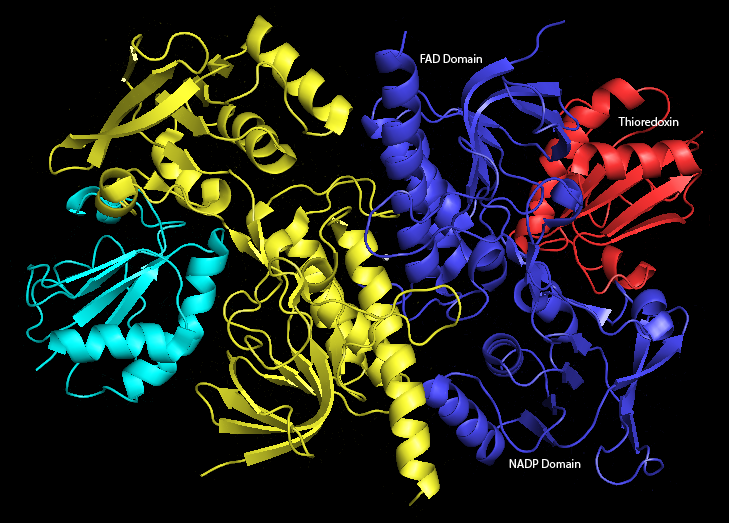
Structure of E. coli ThxR dimer bound thioredoxin

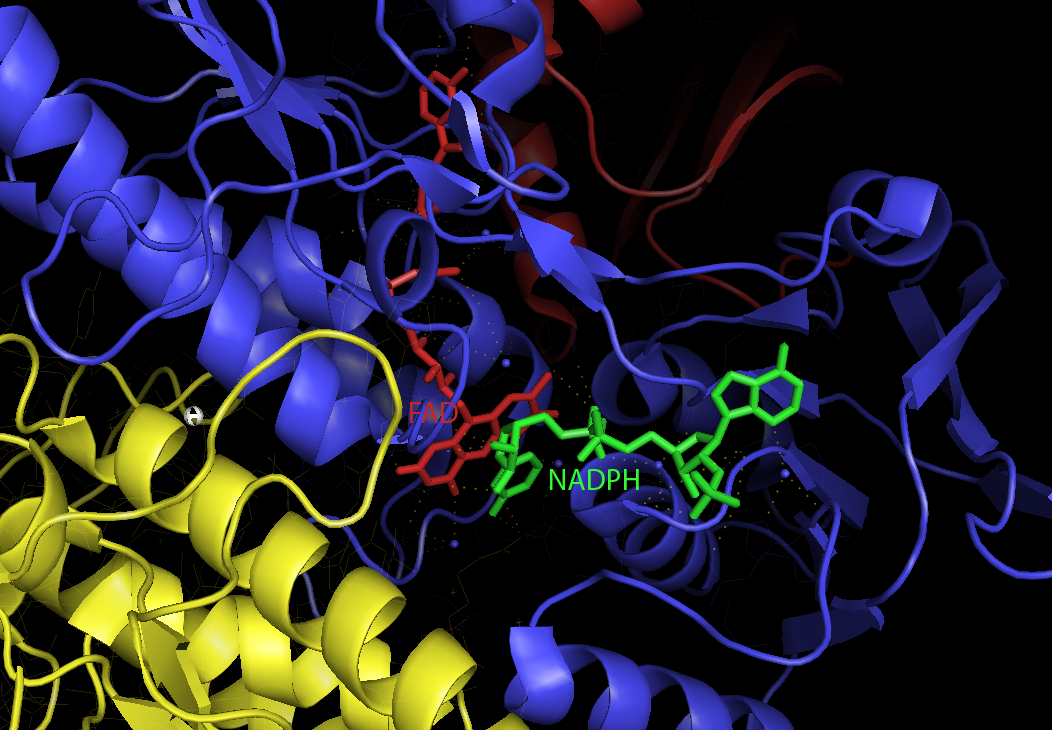
Structure of E. coli ThxR with FAD and NADPH prosthetic groups labeled

=== Mammalian ===
Mammalian TrxR structure is similar to E. coli. It contains a FAD and NADPH binding domain, and an interface between two monomer subunits. Mammalian ThxR has an insertion in the FAD binding domain between two alpha helices, which forms a small pair of beta strands. The active disulfide in the enzyme is located on one of these helices and thus the active disulfide bond is located in the FAD domain and not the NADPH domain as in E. coli and other prokaryotes.

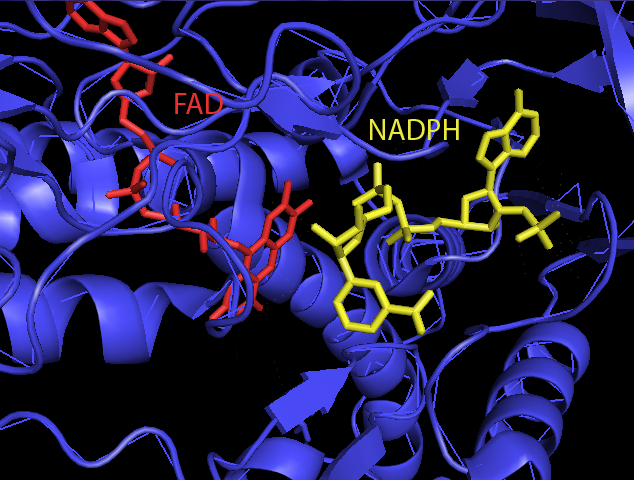
Structure of human ThxR FAD and NADPH prosthetic groups

== Mechanism ==
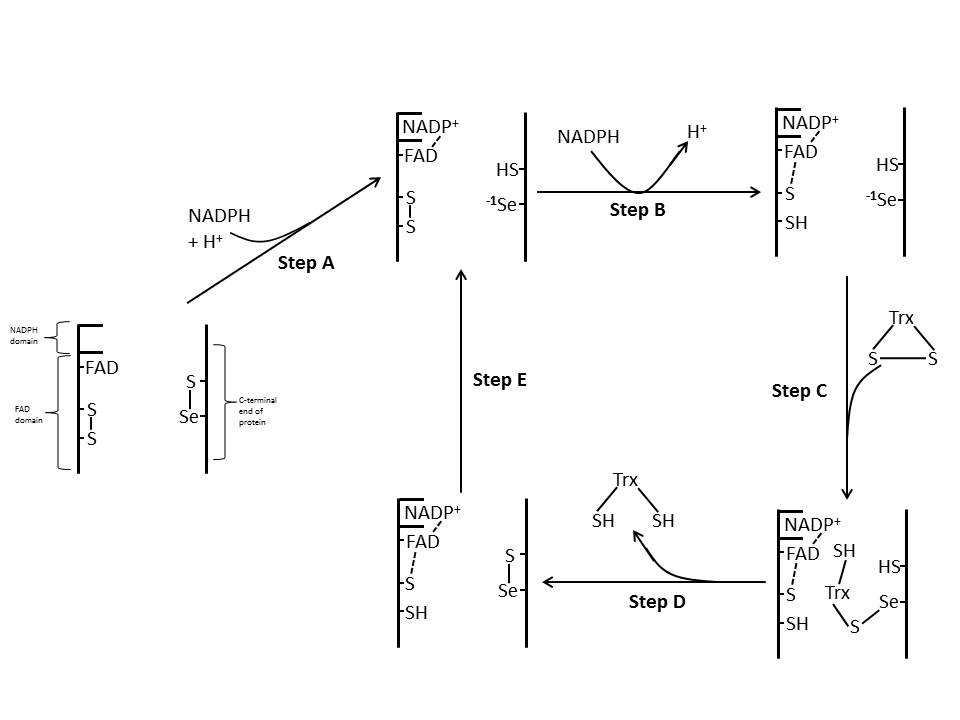
Proposed mechanism in mammals and presumably humans: Starting from the completely oxidized form, the reaction begins with the reduction of the selenenylsulfide to the selenolate anion (Se(-1)) with electrons received from NADPH via FAD (Step A). Due to the low pKa value of the selenol the selenolate anion is the predominant form under physiological conditions. A second electron transfer from a second molecule of NADPH reduces the active site tihiol bonds with one Cys residue stabilized by an interaction with FAD (Step B). The selenolate anion then attacks the disulfide bonds of Trx and the resulting enzyme-Trx mixed selenenylsulfide (Step C), which is then subsequently attacked by the neighboring Cys residue to regenerate the selenenylsulfide (Step D). This selenenylsulfide is then reduced by the active-site thiolate from the other subunit (Step E). Adapted from Zhong et al. Consistent with findings that (2,2‘:6‘,2‘‘-terpyridine)platinum(II) complexes inhibit human TrxR.

=== E. coli ===
In E. coli ThxR the spatial orientation of the FAD and NADPH domains are such that the redox-active rings of FAD and NADPH are not in close proximity to each other. When the FAD domain of E. coli is rotated 66 degrees with the NADPH domain remaining fixed, the two prosthetic groups move into close contact allowing electrons to pass from NADPH to FAD and then to the active site disulfide bond. The conserved active site residues in E. coli are -Cys-Ala-Thr-Cys-.

=== Mammalian ===
Mammalian TrxRs have a much higher sequence homology with glutathione reductase than E. coli. The active-site Cys residues in the FAD domain and bound NADPH domain are in close proximity removing the necessity for a 66 degree rotation for electron transfer found in E. coli. An additional feature of the mammalian mechanism is the presence of a selenocysteine residue at the C-terminal end of the protein which is required for catalytic activity. The conserved residues in mammalian active site are -Cys-Val-Asn-Val-Gly-Cys-.

== Detection methods ==
Thioredoxin reductase can be quantified by various methods such as the DTNB assay using Ellman's reagent. The disulfide-based TRFS series of fluorescent probes have shown selective detection of TrxR. Mafireyi synthesized the first diselenide probe that was applied in the detection of TrxR. Other detection methods include immunological techniques and the selenocystine-thioredoxin reductase assay (SC-TR assay).

== Clinical significance ==
=== Cancer treatment ===
Since the activity of this enzyme is essential for cell growth and survival, it is a good target for anti-tumor therapy. Furthermore, the enzyme is upregulated in several types of cancer, including malignant mesothelioma. For example, motexafin gadolinium (MGd) is a new chemotherapeutic agent that selectively targets tumor cells, leading to cell death and apoptosis via inhibition of thioredoxin reductase and ribonucleotide reductase.

=== Cardiomyopathy ===
Dilated cardiomyopathy (DCM) is a common diagnosis in cases of congestive heart failure. Thioredoxin reductases are essential proteins for regulating cellular redox balance and mitigating the damage caused by reactive oxygen species generated via oxidative phosphorylation in the mitochondria. Inactivation of mitochondrial TrxR2 in mice results in thinning of the ventricular heart walls and neonatal death. Furthermore two mutations in the TrxR2 gene are found in patients diagnosed with DCM and not in a control population. It is hypothesized that the pathological impact of these mutations is an impaired ability to control oxidative damage in cardiac myocytes.

=== Antibiotic ===
There has recently been some research to show that low molecular weight thioredoxin reductase could be a target for novel antibiotics (such as auranofin or Ebselen.) This is especially true for Mycobacterium Haemophilum, and could be used for antibiotic resistant bacteria.
