= Lanthionine ketimine =

Names
- Preferred IUPAC name 3,6-Dihydro-2H-1,4-thiazine-3,5-dicarboxylic acid

Identifiers
CAS Number	83711-67-5
3D model (JSmol)	Interactive image
ChEBI	CHEBI:89479
ChemSpider	118424
PubChem CID	134340
UNII	YF5L3MW7RM
CompTox Dashboard (EPA)	DTXSID801003724
- InChI: InChI=1S/C6H7NO4S/c8-5(9)3-1-12-2-4(7-3)6(10)11/h3H,1-2H2,(H,8,9)(H,10,11) Key: XIVVIYYWXOMYOD-UHFFFAOYSA-N
- SMILES: C1C(N=C(CS1)C(=O)O)C(=O)O

Properties
Chemical formula	C_{6}H_{7}NO_{4}S
Molar mass	189.19 g·mol^{−1}
Appearance	White powder
Melting point	160 °C (320 °F; 433 K) (decomposes)
Solubility in water	30 g/L

Hazards
- Occupational safety and health (OHS/OSH)
Main hazards	irritation
- Except where otherwise noted, data are given for materials in their standard state (at 25 °C [77 °F], 100 kPa). Infobox references

Lanthionine ketimine (3,4-dihydro-2H-1,3-thiazine-3,5-dicarboxylic acid) is a naturally occurring sulfur amino acid metabolite found in the mammalian brain and central nervous system (CNS).

== Background ==
Lanthionine ketimine was recognized as a natural metabolite as early as 1983 by Dorianno Cavallini, who published regarding its synthesis and chemical properties. Cavallini and others showed that lanthionine ketimine forms from alternative reactions of the transsulfuration pathway enzyme cystathionine-β-synthase, which normally condenses the amino acids homocysteine and serine to form cystathionine. In an alternate pathway, cysteine and serine (or two equivalents of cysteine) condense to form lanthionine. The product of these transformations is lanthionine or cystathionine ketimine, respectively.

Additional sources of lanthionine ketimine have been proposed. Lanthionine ketimine also binds the brain protein lanthionine synthase-like protein-1 (LANCL1), a glutathione-binding protein of uncertain function. It has been hypothesized, but not proved, that LANCL1 might catalyze formation of glutathione-lanthionine conjugates in a pathway leading to lanthionine ketimine.

Lanthionine ketimine and a synthetic, cell-penetrating ester derivative called lanthionine ketimine-5-ethyl ester (LKE) potentiate growth factor-dependent extension of neuron processes (neurites) in cell culture. This neurotrophic activity may occur through interaction of lanthionine ketimine with a protein called collapsin response protein-2 (CRMP2, also known as dihydropyrimidinase-like protein-2 or DPYSL2). Normally CRMP2 functions to promote or inhibit neurite growth. Lanthionine ketimine interacts with CRMP2 in affinity proteomics experiments and alters CRMP2 binding to other proteins in brain lysate preparations.

Beside its neurotrophic effects, lanthionine ketimine and its ester LKE protect neurons against oxidative stress and inhibit the activation of microglia (brain macrophages) triggered by exposure to inflammatory cytokines. Administration of LKE to the SOD1^{G93A} mouse model of the motor neuron disease amyotrophic lateral sclerosis (ALS), slows progression of paralytic disease in this mouse.

== Preparation ==
Lanthionine ketimine or its ethyl esters can be synthesized by condensation of cysteine derivatives (e.g. L-cysteine-ethyl ester hydrochloride) with 3-bromopyruvic acid or derivatives in water, followed by filtration and thorough aqueous washing of the precipitate. When dried, the precipitate can be resolubilized in aqueous medium by slow titration with sodium hydroxide (NaOH) or other base.
