= GADL1 =

Enzyme

Identifiers
- Aliases: GADL1, ADC, CSADC, HuADC, HuCSADC, glutamate decarboxylase like 1
- External IDs: OMIM: 615601; MGI: 1920998; GeneCards: GADL1
Available structures
| PDB | Ortholog search: PDBe RCSB |
| PDB | List of PDB id codes 2JIS |
Enzyme activity
| EC # | BRENDA | ExPASy | KEGG | MetaCyc |
|---|---|---|---|---|
| 4.1.1.11 | ↗ | ↗ | ↗ | ↗ |
| 4.1.1.29 | ↗ | ↗ | ↗ | ↗ |

Gene location (Human)
| Chr. | Chromosome 3 (human) |
| Band | 3p24.1-p23 | Start | 30,726,197 bp |
| Band | 3p24.1-p23 | End | 30,894,661 bp |

Gene location (Mouse)
| Chr. | Chromosome 9 (mouse) |
| Band | 9|9 F3 | Start | 115,909,455 bp |
| Band | 9|9 F3 | End | 116,076,176 bp |
RNA expression pattern
| Bgee | Human / Mouse (ortholog); Top expressed in: buccal mucosa cell; germinal epithelium; muscle of thigh; deltoid muscle; Skeletal muscle tissue of rectus abdominis; gastrocnemius muscle; gastric mucosa; vastus lateralis muscle; biceps brachii; Descending thoracic aorta / Top expressed in: olfactory epithelium; lumbar spinal ganglion; knee joint; vastus lateralis muscle; soleus muscle; triceps brachii muscle; medial head of gastrocnemius muscle; skeletal muscle tissue; skin of external ear; spermatid; More reference expression data |
| BioGPS | n/a |
Gene ontology
| Molecular function | sulfinoalanine decarboxylase activity; pyridoxal phosphate binding; catalytic activity; carboxy-lyase activity; aspartate 1-decarboxylase activity; lyase activity |
| Cellular component | cytosol |
| Biological process | cellular amino acid biosynthetic process; carboxylic acid metabolic process; sulfur amino acid catabolic process |
Sources:Amigo / QuickGO
Orthologs
| Databases | NCBI: entry; OMA: entry |
| Species | Human | Mouse |
| Entrez | 339896 | 73748 |
| Ensembl | ENSG00000144644 | ENSMUSG00000056880 |
| UniProt | Q6ZQY3 | Q80WP8 |
| RefSeq (mRNA) | NM_207359 | NM_028638 |
| RefSeq (protein) | NP_997242 | NP_082914; NP_001382689 |
| Location (UCSC) | Chr 3: 30.73 – 30.89 Mb | Chr 9: 115.91 – 116.08 Mb |
| PubMed search |
- Wikidata
| View/Edit Human | View/Edit Mouse |

Glutamate decarboxylase like 1 (GADL1) is the enzyme responsible for decarboxylating aspartate (Asp) to β-alanine and cysteine sulfinic acid (CSA) to hypotaurine. GADL1 is a Pyridoxal 5'-phosphate (PLP)-dependent enzyme. By decarboxylating Asp to β-alanine, GADL1 consequently plays a role in the production of carnosine. Carnosine and taurine have multiple biological functions such as calcium regulation, pH buffering, metal chelation, and antioxidant effects. β-Alanine also plays a role as neurotransmitter or neuromodulator in the central nervous system (CNS) and olfactory bulbs.

== Homology with CSAD ==
GADL1 has 61% homology with another PLP-dependent enzyme cysteine sulfinic acid decarboxylase (CSAD). CSAD plays a role in taurine production by decarboxylating CSA to hypotaurine. Taurine is the most abundant amino acid in mammals and plays roles as an antioxidant, membrane stabilizer and neurotransmitter or neuromodulator in the CNS and recently has received growing attention as a biomarker for different diseases.

== Tissue distribution ==
In humans, both GADL1 and CSAD are expressed in the brain and neurons whereas only CSAD was found in the liver. In mice, both enzymes are expressed in the brain, olfactory bulbs, and skeletal muscle but only CSAD was found in the kidney and liver.

GADL1 is named ADC, CSADC, HuADC, HuCSADC in some papers.

== Structure ==
Both CSAD and GADL1 are homodimers. The structure of mouse GADL1 was published in 2018 with the PDB number 6ENZ and the structure of mouse CSAD was published in 2021 with the PDB number 6ZEK.

== Therapeutic potential ==
In 2014 a paper showed an association between GADL1 variants and bipolar patients' responses to lithium therapy. Although these findings were not replicable, this article triggers more studies on GADL1. So far there has not been any paper published reporting reproducible data on the therapeutic role of GADL1. However, this novel PLP-dependent enzyme has a high potential for further investigation.
