= Aspergillus carneus =

Scientific classification
- Kingdom: Fungi
- Division: Ascomycota
- Class: Eurotiomycetes
- Order: Eurotiales
- Family: Aspergillaceae
- Genus: Aspergillus
- Species: A. carneus

Binomial name
- Aspergillus carneus (Tieghem) Blochwitz 1933

Type strain
- ATCC 16798, CBS 494.65, IMI 135818, NRRL 527, QM 7401, Thom 5740.4, WB 527

Synonyms
- Sterigmatocystis carnea Tiegh. (1877); Aspergillus aureofulgens Luppi Mosca (1973)

Species of fungus

Aspergillus carneus is a fast-growing, filamentous fungus found on detritus and in fertile soil worldwide. It is characterized by its yellow, thick-walled hyphae and biseriate sterigmata. The fungus produces citrinin and 5 unique depsipeptides, Aspergillicins A-E.

== History and taxonomy ==
The fungus was originally isolated by van Tieghem in 1877 from a soil sample in Java, where it was named Sterigmatocystis carnea. The epithet carnea was derived from the Latin meaning "flesh coloured". The fungus was later described by Sartory, Sartory and Meyer in 1930 under the probable synonym Sterigmatocystis albo-rosea, as they erroneously believed it to be a new species. However, the genus Sterigmatocystis is now obsolete. In 1933, the fungus was renamed Aspergillus carneus by Blochwitz, because he believed that van Tieghem's initial description was inadequate. Thus, although some authors have erroneously attributed it to van Tieghem, the epithet carneus that is currently in use was originally coined by Blochwitz.

The classification of A. carneus in section Terrei or section Flavipedes (2 closely related groups belonging to the Aspergillus subgenus Terrei) has been contested. Classifications were originally based on morphological examination. A. carneus was first placed in section Terrei, along with Aspergillus terreus and Aspergillus nivea, by Thom and Raper (1945) due to its transparent aleurioconidia. In 1965, A. carneus was reclassified to Aspergillus section Flavipedes, along with A. flavipes and A. nivea, by Raper and Fennell because its conidial heads were less columnar than those of A. terreus and its unique thick-walled, yellow hyphae. This taxonomic debate was addressed using modern molecular genetic techniques as they became available. In 2000, sequencing of the D1/D2 region of the 28S ribosomal RNA gene indicated that Thom and Raper's original classification (1945) of A. carneus in Aspergillus section Terrei was likely correct. However, Varga et al. (2005) re-examined 3 isolates of A. carneus from the US and Haiti by sequencing the fungus' internal transcribed spacer gene region and conducting a random amplified polymorphic DNA analysis. Their work revealed that A. flavipes, A. terreus and A. carneus species were equally related, rendering the distinction between sections Terrei and Flavipedes obsolete. They recommended that both sections be merged, pending further confirmatory genetic analyses. However, as of 2016, A. carneus continues to be considered a member of section Terrei, along with 15 other members of the genus Aspergillus.

== Growth and physiology ==
Growth of A. carneus is moderate from 24 to 26 °C and optimal from 41 to 42 °C. The fungus cannot grow at temperatures below 6–7 °C or above 46–48 °C. Colonies of A. carneus grow rapidly, reaching a diameter of 4–5 cm in 2 weeks on Czapek medium. Normal growth also occurs on media containing 1% dextrane, and growth is resistant to low water potentials and high salt concentrations. Growth is impaired on malt extract agar and media which are deficient of important fungal macronutrients. On media lacking sulphur, potassium or magnesium, growth is halved. Growth is negligible but present on nitrogen- or phosphorus-deficient media. This observation of mild tolerance to nitrogen or phosphorus deficiency is attributed either to contamination of the media or the ability of A. carneus to utilize atmospheric sources of these nutrients for growth. The fungus is also resistant to heavy metal toxicity. Growth is inhibited but present after inoculation with cobalt, lead, nickel, zinc or cadmium, in concentrations ranging from 100 to 300 mg/L. No growth occurs at heavy metal concentrations exceeding 500 mg/L. Cobalt and cadmium are most toxic to A. carneus, while lead affects growth the least.

A. carneus is known to produce citrinin, a secondary metabolite and mycotoxin characterized by its hepatotoxicity, nephrotoxicity and cytotoxicity. Sclerin, a compound which stimulates plant growth, and dihydrocitrinone, a metabolite of citrinin, have also been isolated from samples of the fungus. Additionally, A. carneus may be characterized by its production of novel secondary metabolites carneamides A-C, carnequinazolines A-C and aryl C-glycoside.

== Morphology ==
On Czapek's agar, A. carneus colonies appear white at the beginning of development, progressing to variable shades of deep red, brownish red or yellow with age. The fungus produces conidiophores (250–400 μm) which are smooth and brown, yellow or colourless. Conidia are smooth, unpigmented and approximately spherical, with a diameter of 2.4–2.8 μm. Conidial heads are columnar in shape (150–200 μm x 25–35 μm) and initially white, appearing pale pink to brown in older cultures. Vesicles are globose, subglobose or hemispherical. Sterigmata are biseriate, while hyphae are characteristically thick-walled. Irregular hyphal branching may occur. Exudate may be absent or present in brown droplets with a strong odour.

The morphology of A. carneus varies based on its growth medium or ecological habitat, presenting a challenge for identification. Grown on malt extract agar, A. carneus exhibits increased sporing, darker pigmentation and larger conidial heads. Otherwise, its morphology is consistent with the description above. A unique strain of A. carneus lacking its unique yellow, thick-walled hyphae was isolated in Arkansas. Its appearance was pale grey-brown. Additionally, a culture of A. carneus derived from estuarine sediment in Tasmania was characterized by a brown mycelium, indicating that morphological strain divergence may have occurred in marine environments.

== Habitat and ecology ==
A. carneus is primarily a soil fungus, preferentially colonizing tropical and subtropical terrestrial environments. It is also found worldwide. The fungus inhabits alkaline, fertile soils and decomposing vegetation. A. carneus has been isolated from soils in Asia, Hawaii, north Africa, South America, Kuwait and southern Europe. The fungus colonizes a range of habitats, including podzolic forests, teak forests and mangrove swamps. It has also been found in forest nurseries in North America and eastern Europe. Rarely, it has been reported to grow on wheat and wild bees. A. carneus has also been isolated from the mycobiotia of the marine algae Laminaria sachalinensis in Russia and from estuarine sediment in Australia, demonstrating its potential to colonize aquatic organisms and environments.

== Industrial and medical applications ==
A. carneus contributes to both medicine and industry, often simultaneously. The fungus produces a unique alkaline lipase (Aspergillus carneus lipase) with high pH and temperature tolerance, 1,3-regioselectivity, stability in organic solvents and esterification and transesterification properties. The lipase hydrolyzes a variety of oils and triglycerides, most notably sunflower oil. It is also extracellular, which improves yield during purification, and is resistant to inhibition by sodium propionate, a common food preservative. No other known fungal lipase exhibits this precise combination of abilities, making it a promising catalyst for industrial processes including synthesis of pharmaceuticals, agricultural chemicals, dairy products and detergents. Media containing glucose, sunflower oil, nitrogen and phosphorus may be used to maximize lipase yield from A. carneus. The Aspegillus carneus lipase is also capable of producing synthetic plant polyphenolics through deactylation, compounds which may protect against oxidative damage in human neurodegenerative disease.

A. carneus also produces cystathionine-γ-lyase (CGL), an enzyme which catalyzes the breakdown of L-cystathionine, a human cysteine synthesis intermediate. Excess L-cystathionine due to CGL deficiency (cystathioninuria) is associated with cardiovascular disease, diabetes and cystic fibrosis. Thus, fungal CGL may have therapeutic potential as a human CGL substitute. The activity of CGL isolated from A. carneus is maximized at 40 °C and slightly basic pH (8–9). It is also non-toxic and correlated with decreased blood concentrations of L-cystathionine in rabbits, a preliminary indicator of safety and therapeutic effectiveness in vivo.

A. carneus secretes a low molecular weight xylanase which hydrolyzes heteroxylan, a component of the plant cell wall. The activity of A. carneus xylanase is stable over a broad pH range (3–10), but is optimized at acidic pH and 60 °C. The enzyme is highly specific to low-cost agricultural waste products, particularly corn cobs and coba husks, which it can degrade into xylooligosaccharides. Xylooligosaccharides may be used as food additives, components of animal feed and prebiotics. A. carneus also produces a thermostable pectinase, which can be used to degrade orange peel and pulp waste, notably in the Egyptian orange juice industry.

A. carneus produces the known fungal metabolite marcfortine A, as well as 5 novel depsipeptides, aspergillicins A–E. Marcfortine A is a paralytic, nematocidal agent which is also active against the commercially relevant ruminant parasite Haemonchus contortus. The aspergillicins exhibit mild cytotoxic activity. A. carneus produces other cytotoxic compounds, including sterigmatocystin, isopropylchaetominine and asteltoxin E, which are potently active against the mouse lymphoma cell line L5178Y and may have therapeutic potential as anti-cancer agents.

== Role in disease ==
=== Human disease ===
A. carneus is an infrequent human pathogen. However, 2 out of 9 cases of disseminated aspergillosis in a cohort of Czech patients, which had originally been attributed to Aspergillus candidus, were found to have instead been caused by A. carneus. The presence of A. carneus in clinical isolates from these patients was confirming using sequencing of the β-tubulin and calmodulin genes, in addition to the internal transcribed spacer (ITS) region of the ribosomal DNA. A. carneus has also been implicated in a case of appendicitis in a 6-year-old Romanian boy with acute myeloid leukemia and neutropenia. The patient's resected appendix was encircled by hyphae, which had penetrated blood vessels inside the tissue. The causative agent of the infection was confirmed to be A. carneus using genomic sequencing of the ITS region. The patient was successfully treated with an appendectomy procedure and the triazole antifungal voriconazole, followed by fluconazole treatment until his neutropenia had resolved. The fungus was also susceptible to the anti-fungal drugs amphotericin B, itraconazole and posaconazole.

A. carneus has also been implicated in 2 cases of human lung aspergillosis in immunocompromised patients. Fragments of A. carneus hyphae and aleuriospores were identified in one patient's sputum at autopsy by morphological examination.

=== Animal disease ===
Rarely, the fungus has also been recognized as a contributor to animal disease. Grains and legumes colonized by A. carneus are toxic to ducklings. Additionally, wild type mice injected with A. carneus conidia (10^{5}) develop cerebral aspergillosis and ataxia after 2–10 days. Inoculation with corticosterone (10 mg) decreases the threshold for neurological symptoms to appear (to 10^{4} conidia), indicating that immune suppression may increase vulnerability to A. carneus infection.
