= Cysteamine dioxygenase =

Class of enzymes

Identifiers
- EC no.: 1.13.11.19
- CAS no.: 9033-41-4

Databases
- IntEnz: IntEnz view
- BRENDA: BRENDA entry
- ExPASy: NiceZyme view
- KEGG: KEGG entry
- MetaCyc: metabolic pathway
- PRIAM: profile
- PDB structures: RCSB PDB PDBe PDBsum
- Gene Ontology: AmiGO / QuickGO
Search
- PMC: articles
- PubMed: articles
- NCBI: proteins

Cysteamine dioxygenase (EC 1.13.11.19) is an enzyme that catalyzes the chemical reaction

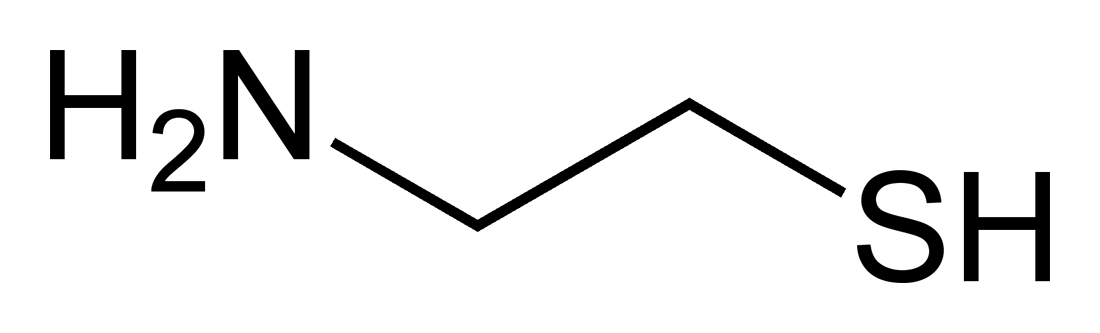
cysteamine
O_{2}
hypotaurine

The two substrates of this enzyme are cysteamine and oxygen. Its product is hypotaurine.

This enzyme belongs to the family of oxidoreductases, specifically those acting on single donors with O_{2} as oxidant and incorporation of two atoms of oxygen into the substrate (oxygenases). The oxygen incorporated need not be derived from O_{2}. The systematic name of this enzyme class is 2-aminoethanethiol:oxygen oxidoreductase. Other names in common use include persulfurase, cysteamine oxygenase, and cysteamine:oxygen oxidoreductase. This enzyme participates in taurine and hypotaurine metabolism. It employs one cofactor, iron.
