= Thiotaurine =

Names
- IUPAC name 2-Aminoethanethiosulfonic acid

Identifiers
CAS Number	2937-54-4
3D model (JSmol)	Interactive image
ChemSpider	5257314
ECHA InfoCard	100.019.017
EC Number	220-918-7
MeSH	C051160
PubChem CID	6858023
UNII	NQZ2D7AO62
CompTox Dashboard (EPA)	DTXSID10863062 DTXSID20183602, DTXSID10863062
- InChI: InChI=1S/C2H7NO2S2/c3-1-2-7(4,5)6/h1-3H2,(H,4,5,6) Key: SHWIJIJNPFXOFS-UHFFFAOYSA-N; InChI=1/C2H7NO2S2/c3-1-2-7(4,5)6/h1-3H2,(H,4,5,6) Key: SHWIJIJNPFXOFS-UHFFFAOYAT
- SMILES: C(CS(=O)(=S)O)N

Properties
Chemical formula	C_{2}H_{7}NO_{2}S_{2}
Molar mass	141.20 g·mol^{−1}
Melting point	213-214 °C
- Except where otherwise noted, data are given for materials in their standard state (at 25 °C [77 °F], 100 kPa). Infobox references

Thiotaurine is a bioactive analog of taurine. It is used as a moisturizer and antioxidant in some cosmetic products.

== Preparation ==
Thiotaurine is made by transsulfuration of thiocysteine and hypotaurine.
