= Taurine dehydrogenase =

Class of enzymes

taurine dehydrogenase

Identifiers
- EC no.: 1.4.99.2
- CAS no.: 50812-14-1

Databases
- IntEnz: IntEnz view
- BRENDA: BRENDA entry
- ExPASy: NiceZyme view
- KEGG: KEGG entry
- MetaCyc: metabolic pathway
- PRIAM: profile
- PDB structures: RCSB PDB PDBe PDBsum
- Gene Ontology: AmiGO / QuickGO
Search
- PMC: articles
- PubMed: articles
- NCBI: proteins

In enzymology, taurine dehydrogenase (EC 1.4.99.2) is an enzyme that catalyzes the chemical reaction.

taurine
+ electron acceptor
H_{2}O
NH_{3}
H_{2}O
NH_{3}
sulfoacetaldehyde
+ reduced acceptor

The 3 substrates of this enzyme are taurine, water, and an electron acceptor. Its products are sulfoacetaldehyde, ammonia, and reduced acceptor.

This enzyme belongs to the family of oxidoreductases, specifically those acting on the CH-NH_{2} group of donors with other acceptors. The systematic name of this enzyme class is taurine:acceptor oxidoreductase (deaminating). This enzyme is also called taurine:(acceptor) oxidoreductase (deaminating). This enzyme participates in nitrogen metabolism.
