= Sulfoacetaldehyde dehydrogenase =

Identifiers
- EC no.: 1.2.1.73

Databases
- IntEnz: IntEnz view
- BRENDA: BRENDA entry
- ExPASy: NiceZyme view
- KEGG: KEGG entry
- MetaCyc: metabolic pathway
- PRIAM: profile
- PDB structures: RCSB PDB PDBe PDBsum
Search
- PMC: articles
- PubMed: articles
- NCBI: proteins

Sulfoacetaldehyde dehydrogenase (EC 1.2.1.73, SafD) is an enzyme with systematic name 2-sulfoacetaldehyde:NAD^{+} oxidoreductase. This enzyme catalyses the following chemical reaction:

sulfoacetaldehyde
+ NAD^{+}
H_{2}O
H^{+}
H_{2}O
H^{+}
sulfoacetic acid
+ NADH

This reaction is part of a bacterial pathway that can make use the amino group of taurine as a sole source of nitrogen for growth.
