= Tauropine dehydrogenase =

Oxidoreductase enzyme

tauropine dehydrogenase

Identifiers
- EC no.: 1.5.1.23
- CAS no.: 104645-74-1

Databases
- IntEnz: IntEnz view
- BRENDA: BRENDA entry
- ExPASy: NiceZyme view
- KEGG: KEGG entry
- MetaCyc: metabolic pathway
- PRIAM: profile
- PDB structures: RCSB PDB PDBe PDBsum
- Gene Ontology: AmiGO / QuickGO
Search
- PMC: articles
- PubMed: articles
- NCBI: proteins

In enzymology, tauropine dehydrogenase (EC 1.5.1.23) is an enzyme that catalyzes the oxidoreduction reaction :

tauropine
+ NAD^{+}
H_{2}O
H^{+}
H_{2}O
H^{+}
taurine
+ NADH +
pyruvic acid

The three substrates of this enzyme are tauropine, oxidised nicotinamide adenine dinucleotide (NAD^{+}), and water. Its products are taurine, reduced NADH, pyruvic acid, and a proton.

This enzyme belongs to the family of oxidoreductases, specifically those acting on the CH-NH group of donors with NAD+ or NADP+ as acceptor. The systematic name of this enzyme class is N2-(D-1-carboxyethyl)taurine:NAD+ oxidoreductase (taurine-forming). This enzyme is also called 2-N-(D-1-carboxyethyl)taurine:NAD+ oxidoreductase (taurine-forming).
