= Cystathionine =

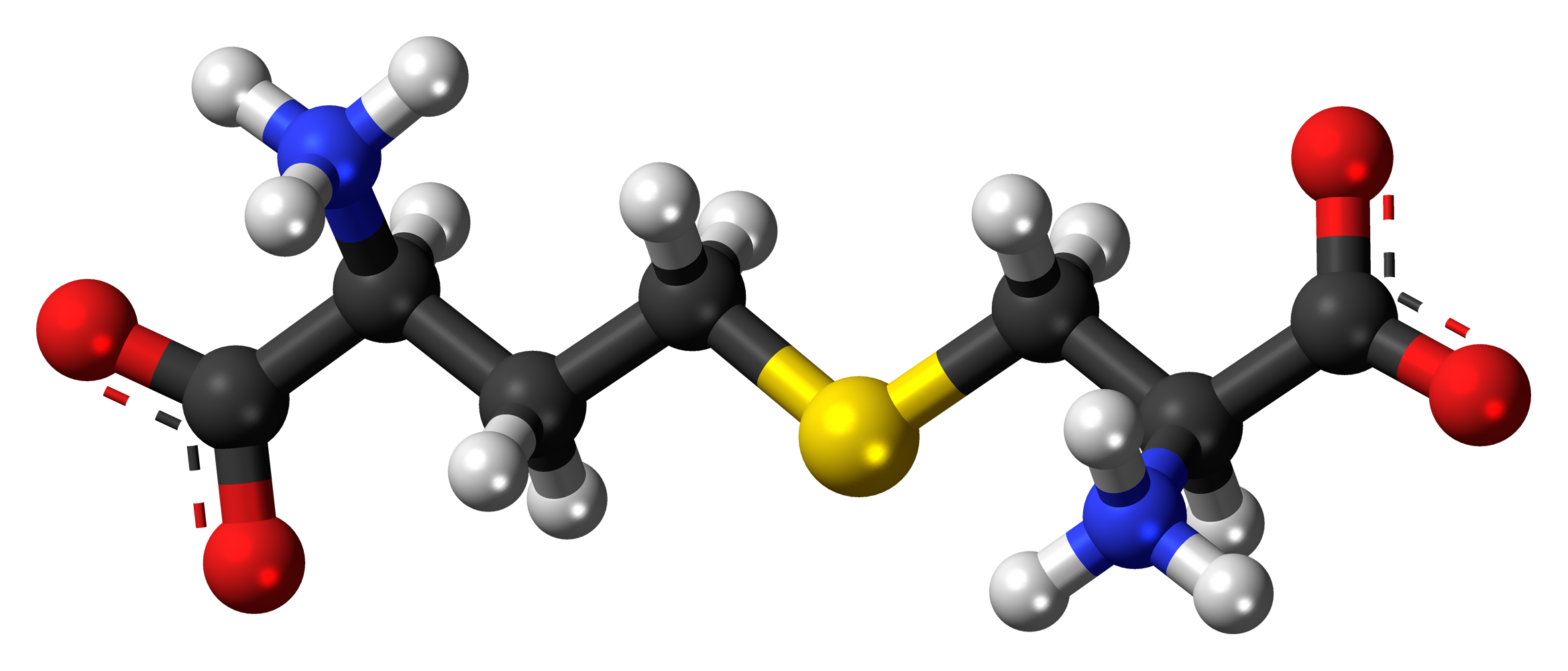

Names
- IUPAC name S-((R)-2-amino-2-carboxyethyl)-L-homocysteine
- Other names L-Cystathionine; S-[(2R)-2-Amino-2-carboxyethyl]-L-homocysteine

Identifiers
| CAS Number | 56-88-2 |
| 3D model (JSmol) | Interactive image |
| ChEBI | CHEBI:17755 |
| ChEMBL | ChEMBL209241 |
| ChemSpider | 388392 |
| ECHA InfoCard | 100.000.269 |
| KEGG | C00542 |
| MeSH | Cystathionine |
| PubChem CID | 439258 |
| UNII | 375YFJ481O |
| CompTox Dashboard (EPA) | DTXSID20971384 |
- InChI: InChI=1S/C7H14N2O4S/c8-4(6(10)11)1-2-14-3-5(9)7(12)13/h4-5H,1-3,8-9H2,(H,10,11)(H,12,13)/t4-,5-/m0/s1 Key: ILRYLPWNYFXEMH-WHFBIAKZSA-N; InChI=1/C7H14N2O4S/c8-4(6(10)11)1-2-14-3-5(9)7(12)13/h4-5H,1-3,8-9H2,(H,10,11)(H,12,13) Key: ILRYLPWNYFXEMH-UHFFFAOYAH
- SMILES: C(CSC[C@@H](C(=O)O)N)[C@@H](C(=O)O)N

Properties
| Chemical formula | C_{7}H_{14}N_{2}O_{4}S |
| Molar mass | 222.26 g·mol^{−1} |
- Except where otherwise noted, data are given for materials in their standard state (at 25 °C [77 °F], 100 kPa). verify (what is ?) Infobox references

Cystathionine is an intermediate in the synthesis of cysteine from homocysteine. It is produced by the transsulfuration pathway and is converted into cysteine by cystathionine gamma-lyase (CTH).

Biosynthetically, cystathionine is generated from homocysteine and serine by cystathionine beta synthase (upper reaction in the diagram below). It is then cleaved into cysteine and α-ketobutyrate by cystathionine gamma-lyase (lower reaction).

An excess of cystathionine in the urine is called cystathioninuria.

Cysteine metabolism. Cystathionine beta synthase catalyzes the upper reaction and cystathionine gamma-lyase catalyzes the lower reaction.

Cysteine dioxygenase (CDO), and sulfinoalanine decarboxylase can turn cysteine into hypotaurine and then taurine. Alternately, the cysteine from the cystathionine gamma-lyase can be used by the enzymes glutamate–cysteine ligase (GCL) and glutathione synthetase (GSS) to produce glutathione.
