= Thetin-homocysteine S-methyltransferase =

Identifiers
- EC no.: 2.1.1.3
- CAS no.: 9029-76-9

Databases
- IntEnz: IntEnz view
- BRENDA: BRENDA entry
- ExPASy: NiceZyme view
- KEGG: KEGG entry
- MetaCyc: metabolic pathway
- PRIAM: profile
- PDB structures: RCSB PDB PDBe PDBsum
- Gene Ontology: AmiGO / QuickGO
Search
- PMC: articles
- PubMed: articles
- NCBI: proteins

Thetin-homocysteine S-methyltransferase (EC 2.1.1.3) is an enzyme that catalyzes the chemical reaction

sulfobetaine
+
L-homocysteine
(methylthio)acetic acid
+
L-methionine

The two substrates of this enzyme are sulfobetaine and L-homocysteine. A methyl group is transferred and the products are (methylthio)acetic acid and L-methionine.

This enzyme belongs to the family of transferases, specifically those transferring one-carbon group methyltransferases. The systematic name of this enzyme class is dimethylsulfonioacetic acid:L-homocysteine S-methyltransferase. Other names in common use include dimethylthetin-homocysteine methyltransferase, and thetin-homocysteine methylpherase.
