= C2H7NO4S =

The molecular formula C_{2}H_{7}NO_{4}S may refer to:

- Ethanolamine-O-sulfate
- Peroxytaurine
