= TauD protein domain =

TauD
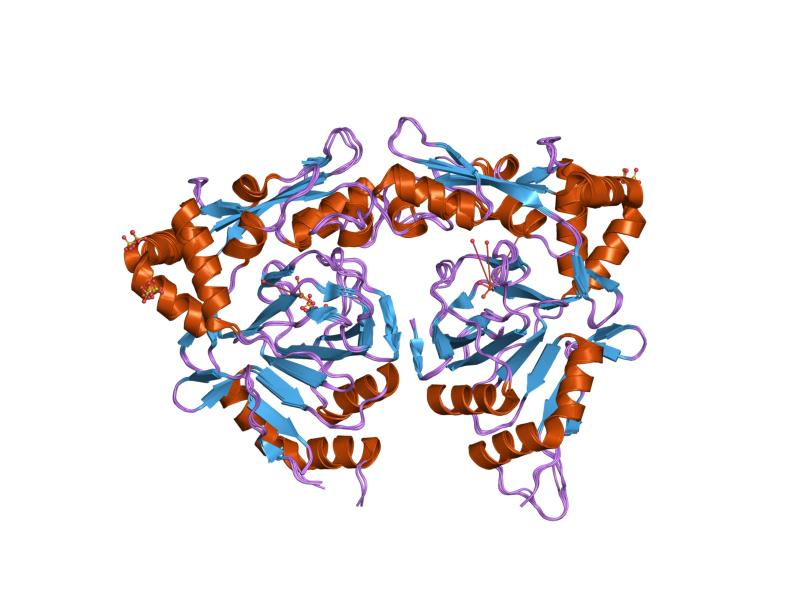
- ensemble refinement of the protein crystal structure of gene product from arabidopsis thaliana at3g21360

Identifiers
- Symbol: TauD
- Pfam: PF02668
- Pfam clan: CL0029
- InterPro: IPR003819
- SCOP2: 1gy9 / SCOPe / SUPFAM
Available protein structures:
- PDB: IPR003819 PF02668 (ECOD; PDBsum)
- AlphaFold: IPR003819; PF02668

In molecular biology, TauD refers to a protein domain that in many enteric bacteria is used to break down taurine (2-aminoethanesulfonic acid) as a source of sulfur under stress conditions. In essence, they are domains found in enzymes that provide bacteria with an important nutrient.

== Function ==
This protein family consists of TauD/TfdA taurine catabolism dioxygenases. The Escherichia coli tauD gene is required for the utilization of taurine (2-aminoethanesulfonic acid) as a sulfur source and is expressed only under conditions of sulfate starvation. TauD is an alpha-ketoglutarate-dependent dioxygenase catalyzing the oxygenolytic release of sulfite from taurine. The 2,4-dichlorophenoxyacetic acid/alpha-ketoglutarate dioxygenase from Burkholderia sp. (strain RASC) also belongs to this family. TfdA from Ralstonia eutropha (Alcaligenes eutrophus) is a 2,4-D monooxygenase.

== Structure ==
This structure has a number of alpha helices and beta sheets.
