= CBSL =

CBSL may refer to:

- Cystathionine beta synthase, a gene
- Central Bank of Sri Lanka
