= Cystathioninuria =

- Other names: Cystathionase deficiency
- Cystathionine
- Specialty: Medical genetics

Cystathioninuria, also called cystathionase deficiency, is a rare autosomal recessive metabolic disorder. It is characterized by an abnormal accumulation of plasma cystathionine leading to excess cystathionine in the urine. Hereditary cystathioninuria is associated with the reduced activity of the enzyme cystathionine gamma-lyase. It is considered a biochemical anomaly. This is because it associated with a wide range of diseases and its inconsistency.

Cystathionase catalyzes cystathionine to cysteine and α-ketobutyrate. Cysteine is an essential amino acid and its conversion from cystathionine occurs in the transsulfuration pathway. The availability of cysteine is necessary for the synthesis of an important antioxidant, glutathione. Cystathionase has a co-enzyme, pyridoxal phosphate, which is the active form the vitamin B6. This means that vitamin B6 is essential for the function of cystathionase.

Cystathioninuria can be broken down into two main categories. Primary cystathioninuria is caused by the recessive inherited deficiency of cystathionase enzyme. Secondary cystathioninuria is described by non-genetic conditions of excess cystathionine. Secondary cystathioninuria includes temporary excess cystathionine of premature infants, severe generalized liver damage, thyrotoxicosis, hepatoblastoma, or neuroblastoma. Cases of secondary cystathioninuria are not responsive to vitamin B6 administration.

== Types ==
Under primary cystathioninuria, the inherited mutation of the CTH gene, there are two forms: vitamin B6-unresponsive and vitamin B6-responsive cystathioninuria. The vitamin B6-unresponsive form is thought to be from a lack of the synthesis of cystathionase. This means that the mutation in the CTH gene from this form of cystathioninuria results in the absence of cystathionase. It can also result from the synthesis of a cystathionase that is so greatly mutated it cannot function at all. However, the vitamin B6-responsive form still has synthesis of cystathionase. However, the cystathionase has an altered ability to bind to vitamin B6, its coenzyme.

== Genetics ==
Cystathioninuria has an autosomal recessive pattern of inheritance.

Cystathioninuria is inherited in an autosomal recessive manner.

Homozygotes and heterozygotes were able to be distinguished in one study through both plasma and urinary levels of cystathionine. The homozygote individuals had cystathionine levels greater than 0.5 moles per milligram of creatinine. Each of the homozygote individuals had a significant amount of cystathionine in the plasma as well. In contrast, the heterozygote individuals excreted approximately one tenth the amount of cystathionine as the homozygote individuals. The heterozygote individuals also had no detectable amounts of cystathionine in their plasma.

The gene for cystathionase, CTH, has been sequenced and multiple mutations have been shown to be associated with the development of cystathioninuria. Two nonsense mutations were found in exon 8 and exon 11 of CTH. Two missense mutations were also found, mainly in exon 2 and exon 7. In addition, a common non-synonymous single nucleotide polymorphism in exon 12 was also identified. The presence of various CTH mutations is consistent with the various categories associated with cystathioninuria.

== Diagnosis ==
The primary way of diagnosing cystathioninuria is through detecting increased urinary excretion of cystathionine. In some cases, a genetic test is employed.

== Treatment ==
The treatment, if any is available, varies depending on the category of cystathioninuria a patient has. The vitamin B6-responsive form is best treated by an increased consumption of vitamin B6.
