= Cystathionine beta synthase =

Mammalian protein found in humans

CBS
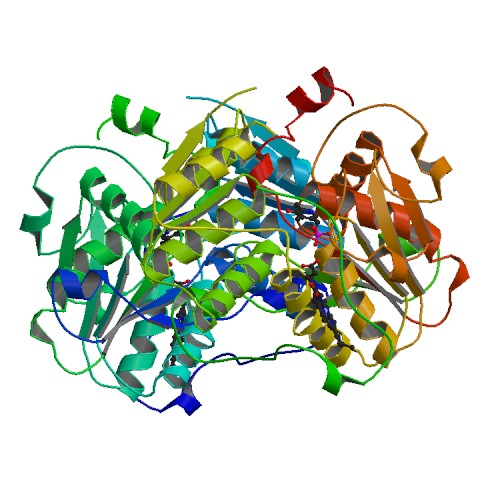

Identifiers
- Aliases: CBS, HIP4, cystathionine-beta-synthase, CBSL, cystathionine beta-synthase
- External IDs: OMIM: 613381; MGI: 88285; GeneCards: CBS
Available structures
PDB	Ortholog search: PDBe RCSB
PDB	List of PDB id codes 1JBQ, 1M54, 4COO, 4L0D, 4L27, 4L28, 4L3V, 4PCU, 4UUU
Enzyme activity
EC #	BRENDA	ExPASy	KEGG	MetaCyc
4.2.1.22	↗	↗	↗	↗

Gene location (Human)
Chr.	Chromosome 21 (human)
Band	21q22.3	Start	43,053,191 bp
Band	21q22.3	End	43,076,943 bp

Gene location (Mouse)
Chr.	Chromosome 17 (mouse)
Band	17 B1|17 16.93 cM	Start	31,827,868 bp
Band	17 B1|17 16.93 cM	End	31,856,212 bp
RNA expression pattern
Bgee	Human / Mouse (ortholog); Top expressed in: right lobe of liver; body of pancreas; right hemisphere of cerebellum; ventricular zone; stromal cell of endometrium; tibial nerve; ganglionic eminence; temporal lobe; amygdala; left lobe of thyroid gland / Top expressed in: left lobe of liver; right kidney; human kidney; proximal tubule; pancreas; islet of Langerhans; lumbar subsegment of spinal cord; interventricular septum; pyloric antrum; primary visual cortex; More reference expression data
BioGPS	n/a
Gene ontology
Molecular function	oxygen binding; protein homodimerization activity; cystathionine beta-synthase activity; metal ion binding; nitric oxide binding; catalytic activity; protein binding; heme binding; modified amino acid binding; S-adenosyl-L-methionine binding; lyase activity; identical protein binding; enzyme binding; pyridoxal phosphate binding; nitrite reductase (NO-forming) activity; ubiquitin protein ligase binding; carbon monoxide binding; cysteine synthase activity
Cellular component	cytoplasm; cytosol; nucleus
Biological process	transsulfuration; cysteine biosynthetic process via cystathionine; L-serine metabolic process; DNA protection; cellular amino acid biosynthetic process; L-serine catabolic process; cysteine biosynthetic process; homocysteine catabolic process; hydrogen sulfide biosynthetic process; metabolism; homocysteine metabolic process; L-cysteine catabolic process; cysteine biosynthetic process from serine
Sources:Amigo / QuickGO
Orthologs
Databases	NCBI: entry; OMA: entry
Species	Human	Mouse
Entrez	875	12411
Ensembl	ENSG00000160200	ENSMUSG00000024039
UniProt	P35520; P0DN79	Q91WT9
RefSeq (mRNA)	NM_000071; NM_001178008; NM_001178009; NM_001320298; NM_001321072	NM_001271353; NM_144855; NM_178224
RefSeq (protein)	NP_000062; NP_001171479; NP_001171480; NP_001307227; NP_001308001 NP_001308002; NP_001340935; NP_001340936; NP_001340937; NP_001340938; NP_001340939; NP_001340941; NP_001340943; NP_001340944; NP_001308002; NP_001340935; NP_001340936; NP_001340937; NP_001340938; NP_001340939; NP_001340941; NP_001340943; NP_001340944	NP_001258282; NP_659104; NP_835742
Location (UCSC)	Chr 21: 43.05 – 43.08 Mb	Chr 17: 31.83 – 31.86 Mb
PubMed search
- Wikidata
View/Edit Human	View/Edit Mouse

Cystathionine-β-synthase, also known as CBS, is an enzyme (EC 4.2.1.22) that in humans is encoded by the CBS gene. It catalyzes the first step of the transsulfuration pathway, from homocysteine to cystathionine:

L-serine + L-homocysteine $\rightleftharpoons$ L-cystathionine + H_{2}O

CBS uses the cofactor pyridoxal-phosphate (PLP) and can be allosterically regulated by effectors such as the ubiquitous cofactor S-adenosyl-L-methionine (adoMet). This enzyme belongs to the family of lyases, to be specific, the hydro-lyases, which cleave carbon-oxygen bonds.

CBS is a multidomain enzyme composed of an N-terminal enzymatic domain and two CBS domains. The CBS gene is the most common locus for mutations associated with homocystinuria.

== Nomenclature ==
The systematic name of this enzyme class is L-serine hydro-lyase (adding homocysteine; L-cystathionine-forming). Other names in common use include:

- β-thionase,
- cysteine synthase,
- L-serine hydro-lyase (adding homocysteine),
- methylcysteine synthase,
- serine sulfhydrase, and
- serine sulfhydrylase.

Methylcysteine synthase was assigned the EC number EC 4.2.1.23 in 1961. A side-reaction of CBS caused this. The EC number EC 4.2.1.23 was deleted in 1972.

== Structure ==
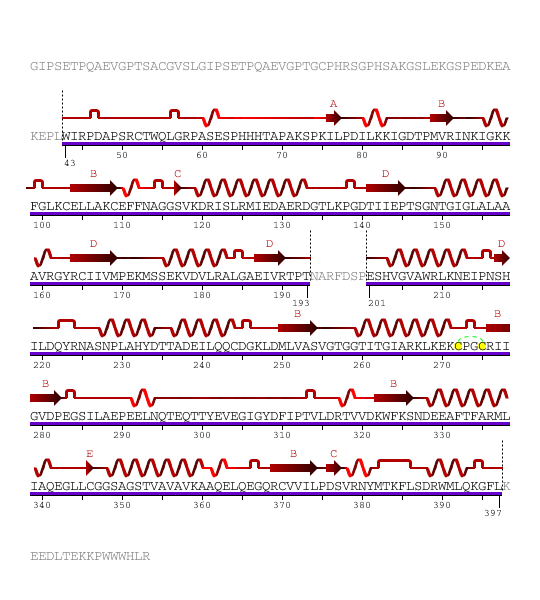
Sequence and secondary structure of the CBS enzyme.

The human enzyme cystathionine β-synthase is a tetramer and comprises 551 amino acids with a subunit molecular weight of 61 kDa. It displays a modular organization of three modules with the N-terminal heme domain followed by a core that contains the PLP cofactor. The cofactor is deep in the heme domain and is linked by a Schiff base. A Schiff base is a functional group containing a C=N bond with the nitrogen atom connected to an aryl or alkyl group. The heme domain is composed of 70 amino acids and it appears that the heme only exists in mammalian CBS and is absent in yeast and protozoan CBS. At the C-terminus, the regulatory domain of CBS contains a tandem repeat of two CBS domains of β-α-β-β-α, a secondary structure motif found in other proteins. CBS has a C-terminal inhibitory domain. The C-terminal domain of cystathionine β-synthase regulates its activity via both intrasteric and allosteric effects and is important for maintaining the tetrameric state of the protein. This inhibition is alleviated by binding of the allosteric effector, adoMet, or by deletion of the regulatory domain; however, the magnitude of the effects differ. Mutations in this domain are correlated with hereditary diseases.

The heme domain contains an N-terminal loop that binds heme and provides the axial ligands C52 and H65. The distance of heme from the PLP binding site suggests its non-role in catalysis, however deletion of the heme domain causes loss of redox sensitivity, therefore it is hypothesized that heme is a redox sensor. The presence of protoporphyrin IX in CBS is a unique PLP-dependent enzyme and is only found in the mammalian CBS. D. melanogaster and D. discoides have truncated N-terminal extensions and therefore prevent the conserved histidine and cysteine heme ligand residues. However, the Anopheles gambiae sequence has a longer N-terminal extension than the human enzyme and contains the conserved histidine and cysteine heme ligand residues like the human heme. Therefore, it is possible that CBS in slime molds and insects are hemeproteins that suggest that the heme domain is an early evolutionary innovation that arose before the separation of animals and the slime molds. The PLP is an internal aldimine and forms a Schiff base with K119 in the active site. Between the catalytic and regulatory domains exists a hypersensitive site that causes proteolytic cleavage and produces a truncated dimeric enzyme that is more active than the original enzyme. Both truncated enzyme and the enzyme found in yeast are not regulated by adoMet. The yeast enzyme is also activated by the deletion of the C-terminal to produce the dimeric enzyme.

As of late 2007, two structures have been solved for this class of enzymes, with PDB accession codes PDB: 1JBQ and PDB: 1M54.

== Enzymatic activity ==
cystathionine beta-synthase
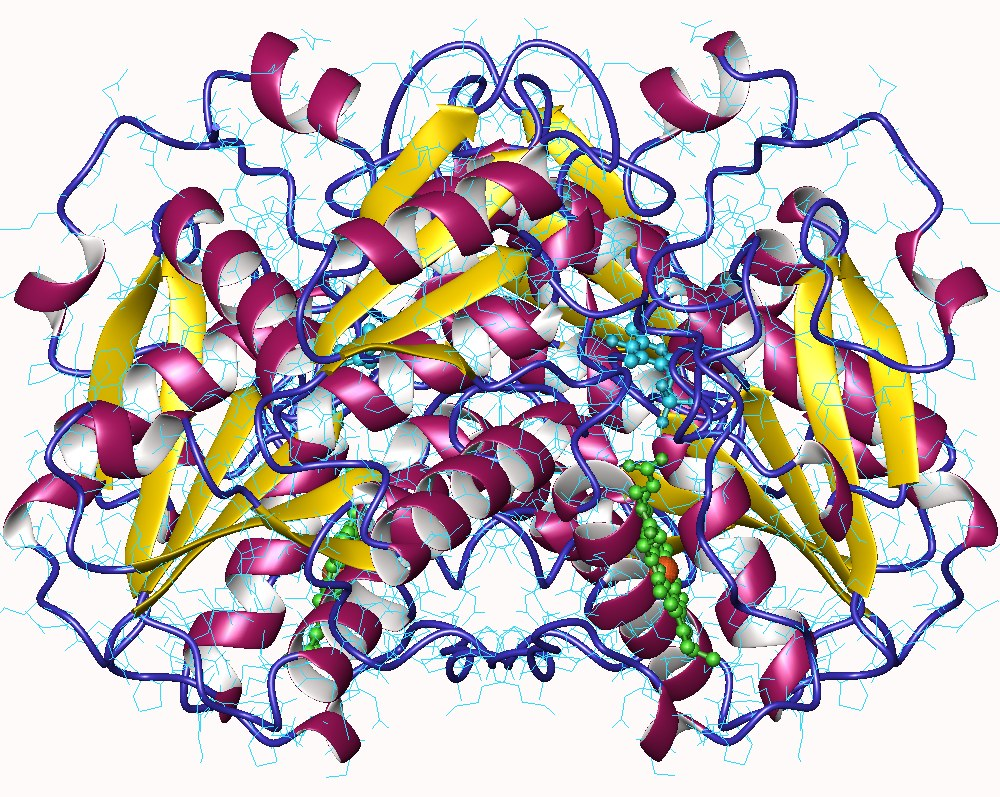
- Cystathionine beta synthase homodimer, Human

Identifiers
- EC no.: 4.2.1.22
- CAS no.: 9023-99-8

Databases
- BRENDA: enzyme data
- ExPASy: NiceZyme view
- KEGG: enzyme entry
- MetaCyc: metabolic pathway
- Rhea: reactions
- PDB structures: RCSB PDB PDBe PDBsum
- Gene Ontology: AmiGO / QuickGO
Search
- PMC: articles
- PubMed: articles
- NCBI: proteins

Cysteine metabolism. Cystathionine beta synthase catalyzes the upper reaction and cystathionine gamma-lyase catalyzes the lower reaction.

Transsulfuration, catalyzed by CBS, converts homocysteine to cystathionine, which cystathione gamma lyase converts to cysteine.

CBS occupies a pivotal position in mammalian sulfur metabolism at the homocysteine junction where the decision to conserve methionine or to convert it to cysteine via the transsulfuration pathway, is made. Moreover, the transsulfuration pathway is the only pathway capable of removing sulfur-containing amino acids under conditions of excess.

In analogy with other β-replacement enzymes, the reaction catalyzed by CBS is predicted to involve a series of adoMet-bound intermediates. Addition of serine results in a transchiffization reaction, which forms of an external aldimine. The aldimine undergoes proton abstraction at the α-carbon followed by elimination to generate an amino-acrylate intermediate. Nucleophilic attack by the thiolate of homocysteine on the aminoacrylate and reprotonation at Cα generate the external aldimine of cystathionine. A final transaldimination reaction releases the final product, cystathionine. The final product, L-cystathionine can also form an aminoacrylate intermediate, indicating that the entire reaction of CBS is reversible.

The measured V_{0} of an enzyme-catalyzed reaction, in general, reflects the steady state (where [ES] is constant), even though V_{0} is limited to the early part of a reaction, and analysis of these initial rates is referred to as steady-state kinetics. Steady-state kinetic analysis of yeast CBS yields parallel lines. These results agree with the proposed ping-pong mechanism in which serine binding and release of water are followed by homocysteine binding and release of cystathionine. In contrast, the steady-state enzyme kinetics of rat CBS yields intersecting lines, indicating that the β-substituent of serine is not released from the enzyme prior to binding of homocysteine.

One of the alternate reactions involving CBS is the condensation of cysteine with homocysteine to form cystathionine and hydrogen sulfide (H_{2}S). H_{2}S in the brain is produced from L-cysteine by CBS. This alternative metabolic pathway is also dependent on adoMet.

CBS enzyme activity is not found in all tissues and cells. It is absent from heart, lung, testes, adrenal, and spleen in rats. In humans, it has been shown to be absent in heart muscle and primary cultures of human aortic endothelial cells. The lack of CBS in these tissues implies that these tissues are unable to synthesize cysteine and that cysteine must be supplied from extracellular sources. It also suggests that these tissues might have increased sensitivity to homocysteine toxicity because they cannot catabolize excess homocysteine via transsulfuration.

== Regulation ==
Allosteric activation of CBS by S-Adenosyl methionine (SAM) determines the metabolic fate of homocysteine. Mammalian CBS is activated 2.5-5-fold by SAM with a dissociation constant of 15 μM. SAM is an allosteric activator that increases the V_{max} of the CBS reaction but does not affect the K_{m} for the substrates. In other words, SAM stimulates CBS activity by increasing the turnover rate rather than the binding of substrates to the enzyme. This protein may use the morpheein model of allosteric regulation.

Human CBS performs a crucial step in the biosynthetic pathway of cysteine by providing a regulatory control point for SAM. Homocysteine, after being methylated to methionine, can be converted to SAM, which donates methyl groups to a variety of substrates, e.g., neurotransmitters, proteins, and nucleic acids. SAM functions as an allosteric activator of CBS and exerts control on its biosynthesis: low concentrations of SAM result in low CBS activity, thereby funneling homocysteine into the transmethylation cycle toward SAM formation. In contrast, high SAM concentrations funnel homocysteine into the transsulfuration pathway toward cysteine biosynthesis.

In mammals, CBS is a highly regulated enzyme, which contains a heme cofactor that functions as a redox sensor, that can modulate its activity in response to changes in the redox potential. If the resting form of CBS in the cell has ferrous (Fe^{2+}) heme, the potential exists for activating the enzyme under oxidizing conditions by conversion to the ferric (Fe^{3+}) state. The Fe^{2+} form of the enzyme is inhibited upon binding CO or nitric oxide, whereas enzyme activity is doubled when the Fe^{2+} is oxidized to Fe^{3+}. The redox state of the heme is pH dependent, with oxidation of Fe^{2+}–CBS to Fe^{3+}–CBS being favored at low pH conditions.

Since mammalian CBS contains a heme cofactor, whereas yeast and protozoan enzyme from Trypanosoma cruzi do not have heme cofactors, researchers have speculated that heme is not required for CBS activity.

CBS is regulated at the transcriptional level by NF-Y, SP-1, and SP-3. In addition it is upregulated transcriptionally by glucocorticoids and glycogen, and downregulated by insulin. Methionine upregulates CBS at the post-transcriptional level.

== Human disease ==
Down syndrome is a medical condition characterized by an overexpression of cystathionine beta synthase (CBS) and a low level of homocysteine in the blood. It has been speculated that cystathionine beta synthase overexpression could be the major culprit in this disease (along with dysfunctioning of GabaA and DYRK1A). The phenotype of Down syndrome is the opposite of hyperhomocysteinemia (described below). Pharmacologicals inhibitors of CBS have been patented by the Jerome Lejeune Foundation (November 2011) and trials (animals and humans are planned).

Hyperhomocysteinemia is a medical condition characterized by an abnormally large level of homocysteine in the blood. Mutations in CBS are the single most common cause of hereditary hyperhomocysteinemia. Genetic defects that affect the MTHFR, MTR, and MTRR/MS enzyme pathways can also contribute to high homocysteine levels. Inborn errors in CBS result in hyperhomocysteinemia with complications in the cardiovascular system leading to early and aggressive arterial disease. Hyperhomocysteinemia also affects three other major organ systems including the ocular, central nervous, and skeletal.

Homocystinuria due to CBS deficiency is a special type of hyperhomocysteinemia. It is a rare, hereditary recessive autosomal disease, in general diagnosed during childhood. A total of 131 different homocystinuria-causing mutations have been identified. A common functional feature of the mutations in the CBS domains is that the mutations abolish or strongly reduce activation by SAM. No specific cure has been discovered for homocystinuria; however, many people are treated using high doses of vitamin B_{6}, which is a cofactor of CBS.

== Bioengineering ==
Cystathionine beta synthase (CBS) is involved in oocyte development. However, little is known about the regional and cellular expression patterns of CBS in the ovary and research is now focused on determining the location and expression during follicle development in the ovaries.

Absence of Cystathionine beta synthase in mice provokes infertility due to the loss of uterine protein expression.

== Mutations ==
The genes that control CBS enzyme expression may not operate at 100% efficiency in individuals who have one of the SNPs (single-nucleotide polymorphisms, a type of mutations) that affect this gene. Known variants include the A360A, C699T, I278T, N212N, and T42N SNPs (among others). These SNPs, which have varied effects on the effectiveness of the enzyme, can be detected with standard DNA testing methods.

== See also ==
- Homocystinuria
- Cysteine
- DNA methylation
- Metabolism
- Amino acid
- S-Adenosyl-L-methionine
- Heme
