= Cysteine dioxygenase =

Enzyme

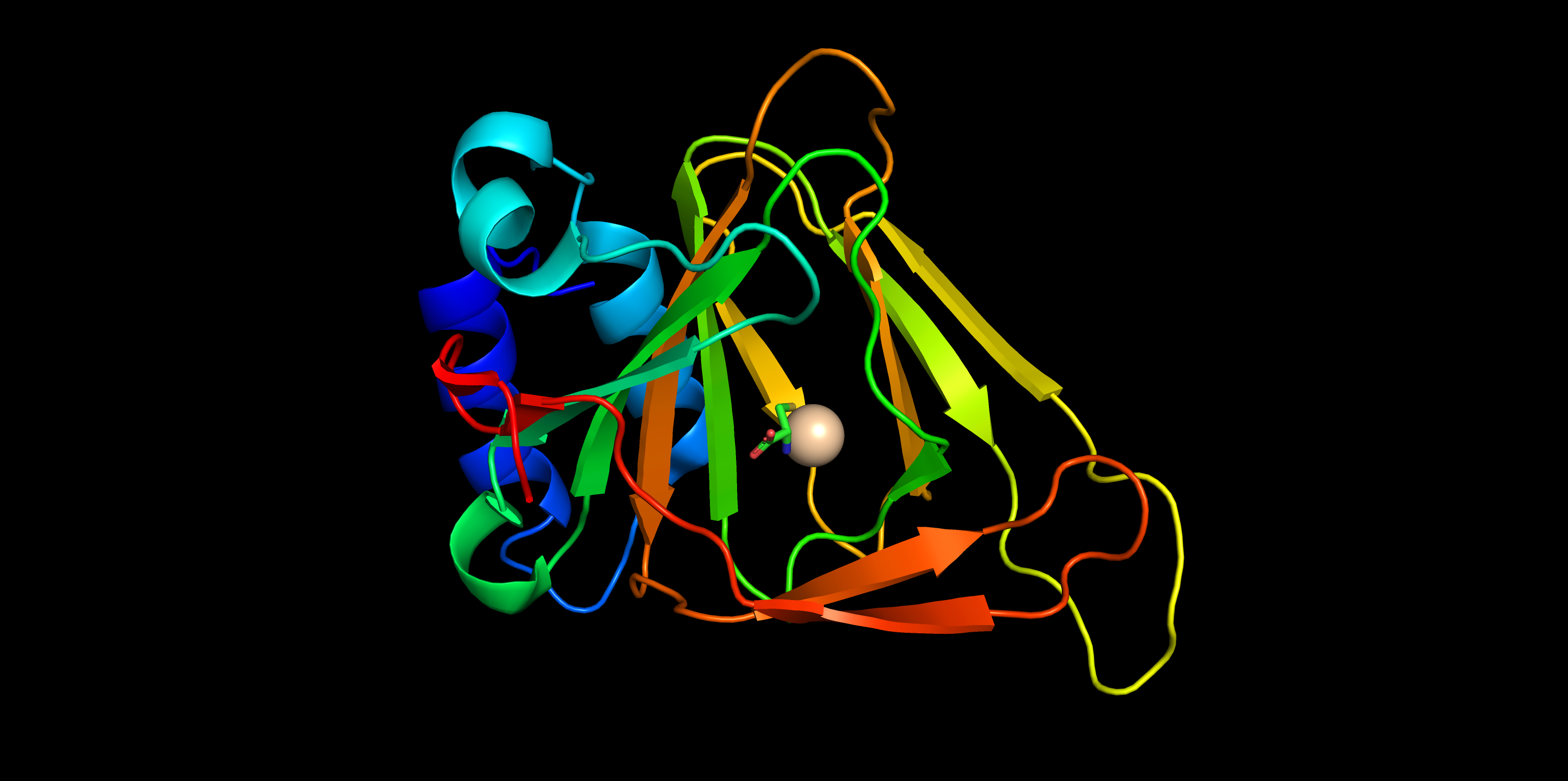
- Human CDO (drawn from PDB 2IC1)

Identifiers
- EC no.: 1.13.11.20
- CAS no.: 37256-59-0

Databases
- IntEnz: IntEnz view
- BRENDA: BRENDA entry
- ExPASy: NiceZyme view
- KEGG: KEGG entry
- MetaCyc: metabolic pathway
- PRIAM: profile
- PDB structures: RCSB PDB PDBe PDBsum
Search
- PMC: articles
- PubMed: articles
- NCBI: proteins

cysteine dioxygenase, type I
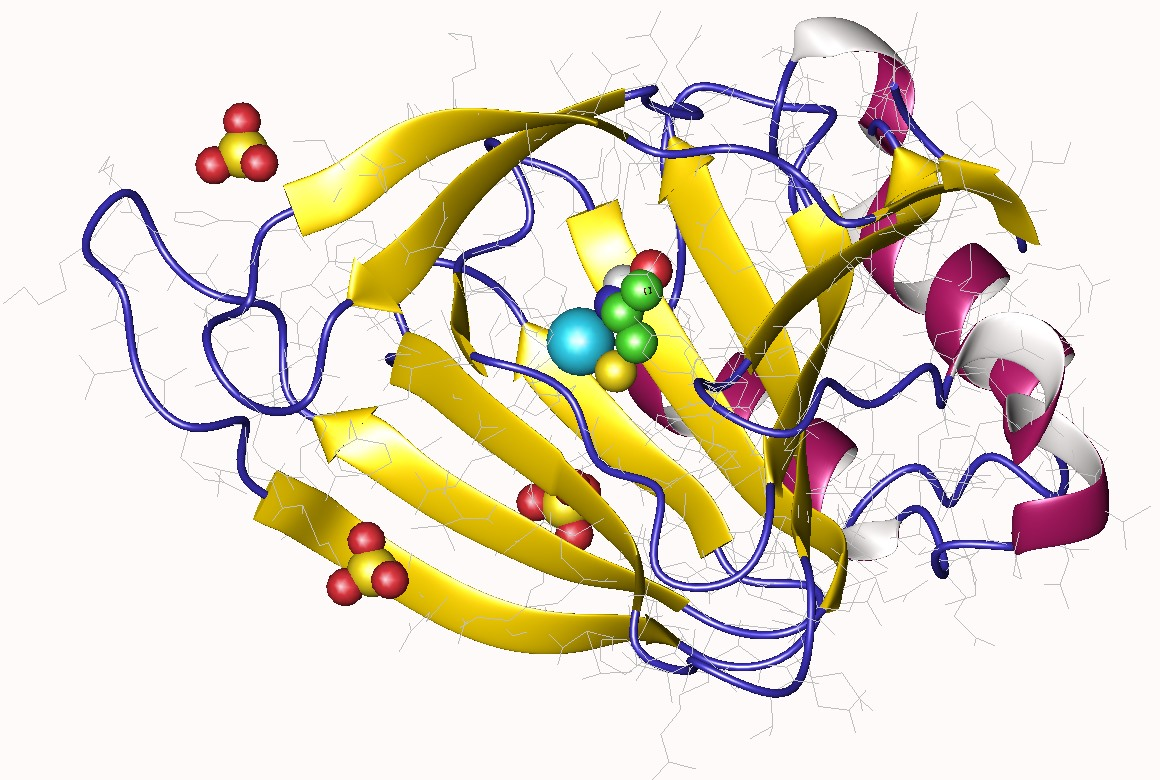
- Cysteine dioxygenase 1, monomer, Human

Identifiers
- Symbol: CDO1
- NCBI gene: 1036
- HGNC: 1795
- OMIM: 603943
- RefSeq: NM_001801
- UniProt: Q16878

Other data
- EC number: 1.13.11.20
- Locus: Chr. 5 q23.2
Search for
- Structures: Swiss-model
- Domains: InterPro

Cysteine dioxygenase (CDO) is a non-heme iron enzyme that catalyzes the conversion of L-cysteine to cysteine sulfinic acid (cysteine sulfinate). CDO plays a role in cysteine catabolism, regulating intracellular levels of cysteine. As such, CDO is highly regulated and undergoes large changes in concentration and efficiency. It oxidizes cysteine to the corresponding sulfinic acid by activation of dioxygen. In addition to being found in mammals, CDO also exists in some yeast and bacteria. CDO has been implicated in various neurodegenerative diseases and cancers, which is likely related to cysteine toxicity.

== Function ==
CDO is responsible for the first major step in metabolism of cysteine. CDO oxidizes to cysteine sulfinic acid (which exists predominantly in the anionic sulfinate form in vivo). Overall, CDO catalyzes the addition of dioxygen (O_{2}) to a thiol, producing a sulfinic acid. More specifically, CDO is part of the group of non-heme iron oxygenases that employ oxygen as an electron acceptor. Cysteine sulfinic acid is then metabolized further via two divergent pathways: decarboxylated to hypotaurine by sulfinoalanine decarboxylase and oxidized to taurine by hypotaurine dehydrogenase; or transaminated to a putative 3-sulfinylpyruvate intermediate, which decomposes spontaneously into pyruvate and sulfite. Sulfite can then be oxidized to sulfate by sulfite oxidase. Thus CDO is necessary for hypotaurine/taurine and sulfite/sulfate production. The role of CDO may vary between cell types as it can either be used primarily for taurine or sulfate production or for degradation of cysteine.

CDO reaction scheme showing cysteine sulfinic acid formation from cysteine by dioxygen incorporation

== Structure ==
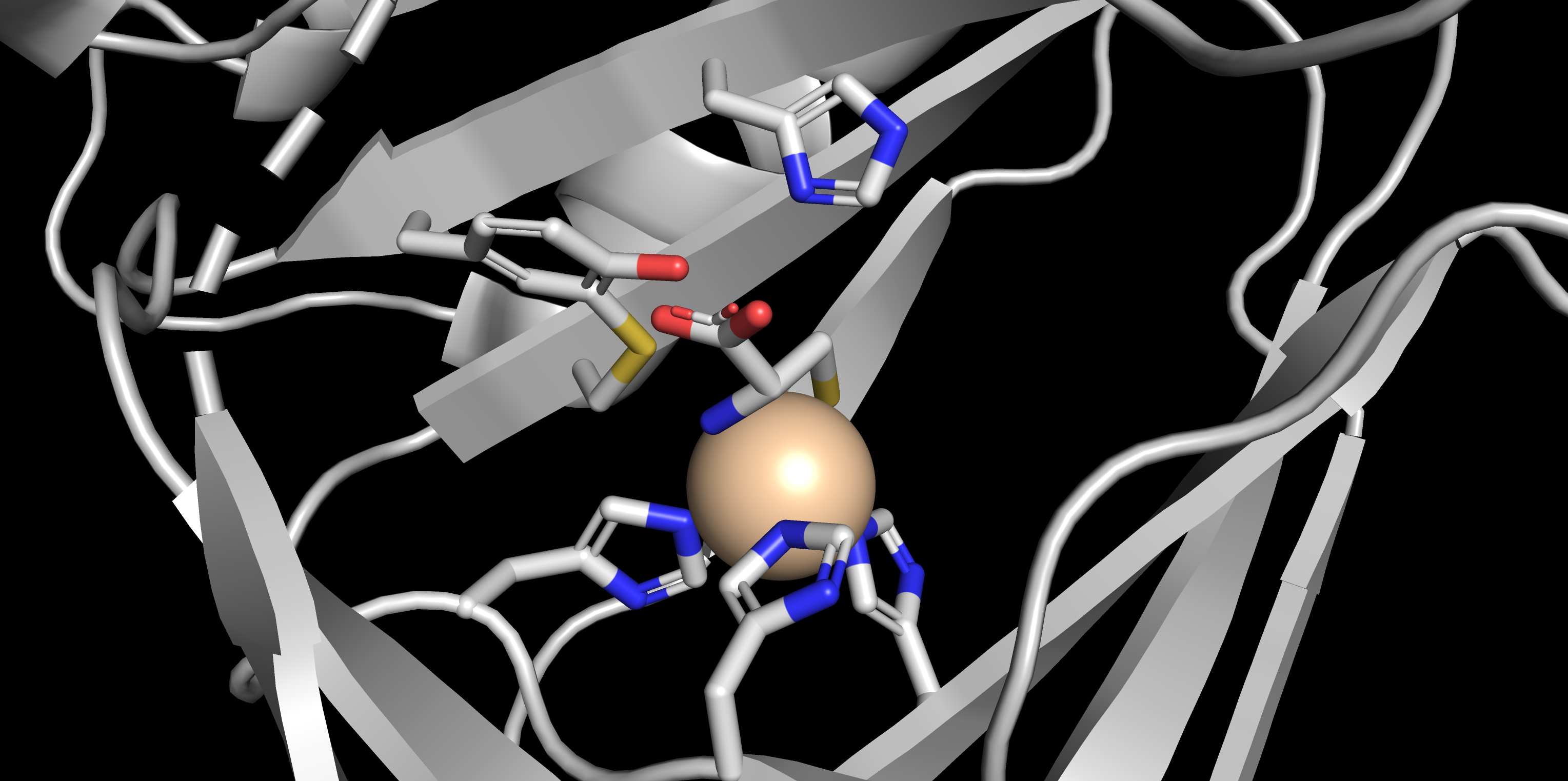
Active site of CDO, with iron (II) bound to cysteine substrate and key residues highlighted. Generated from 2IC1.

CDO is a 22.5 kDa protein that contains 200 amino acid residues and has an isoelectric point (pI) of 5.5. The primary structure is highly conserved between mammalian species, with murine and human CDO differing in only 16 residues. CDO is part of the cupin superfamily, whose members possess a 6-stranded β-barrel in a "jelly-roll" topology. Crystal structures of the protein have been obtained at 1.5 Å resolution (mouse). The active site displays a unique geometry where instead of the typical facial triad of two histidines and one carboxylate side-chain coordinating to an iron (II) species, three histidine ligands are bound to iron. Furthermore, crystal structures show the amino nitrogen and thiolate sulfur of cysteine coordinated to the iron in addition to a single water molecule (see figure).

CDO contains a unique internal cofactor created by intramolecular thioether formation between Cys93 and Tyr157, which is postulated to participate in catalysis. When the protein was first isolated, two bands on agarose gel were observed, corresponding to the cofactor-containing protein and the unlinked "immature" protein, respectively. Crosslinking increases efficiency of CDO ten-fold and is regulated by levels of cysteine, an unusual example of protein cofactor formation mediated by substrate (feedforward activation).

== Mechanism ==
The CDO mechanism is still not well understood, despite active research to elucidate details of the reaction. Overall, the reaction involves addition of O_{2} to cysteine, which occurs spontaneously without enzyme catalysis. Studies have shown that the cysteinyltyrosine bridge lowers the oxidation potential of tyrosine (commonly an electron donor, as in photosystem II) by ~0.5 V relative to phenol and increases its acidity. The thioether moiety likely plays a structural, redox, or, acid/base role. Other studies have shown that Tyr157 is needed for enzyme function (possibly as a tyrosinyl radical) and is highly conserved across CDO variants. Furthermore, research has shown that cysteamine, a structurally similar molecule to cysteine, enhances cysteine oxidation but is not a substrate.

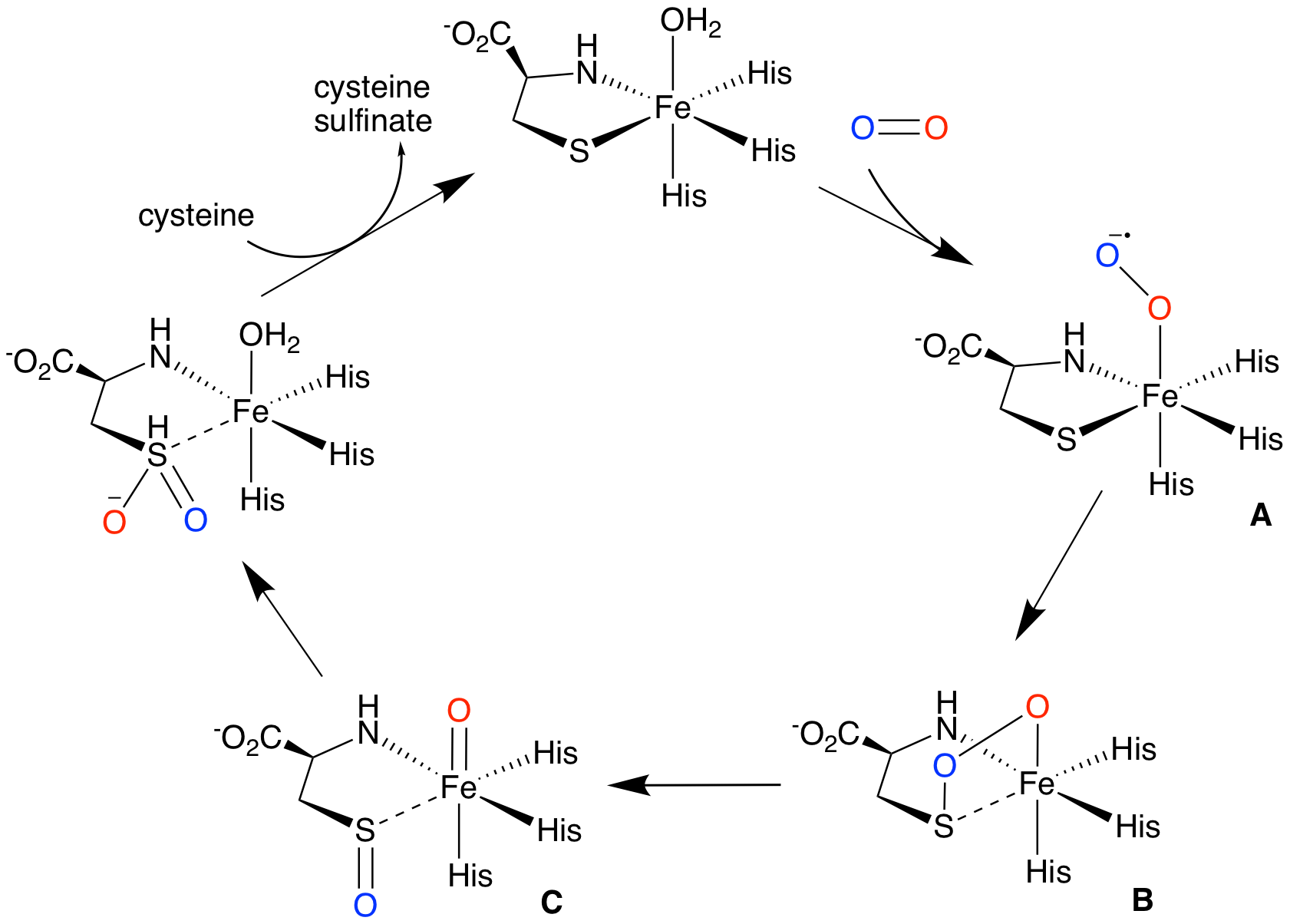
Proposed mechanism of CDO

One proposed mechanism, supported by computational and spectroscopic studies, involves O_{2} binding cis to a thiolate to form reactive iron (III)-superoxo species (A), which then attacks the bound sulfur of cysteine to form a four-membered ring structure (B). Heterolytic O-O bond cleavage then affords a high-valent iron (IV) oxo intermediate (C), which transfers the second oxygen to sulfur.

== Regulation ==
CDO is tightly regulated in the cell to maintain cysteine homeostasis. In particular, CDO responds to changes in dietary cysteine availability and protein intake, maintaining decreased activity with low cysteine levels and increased activity at high levels to prevent cytotoxicity. Studies have shown that CDO can exhibit a dramatic increase in hepatic activity within hours. Unlike many enzymes, it is predominantly regulated at the level of protein turnover rather than transcriptional (mRNA levels). High cysteine levels inhibit ubiquitinylation, which lowers the rate of proteasomal degradation. CDO is also regulated in adipose tissue, where high cysteine levels cause increased hypotaurine/taurine production. Regulation of CDO is also thought to involve both the crosslinked and immature forms of the protein.

== Disease relevance ==
Because of its relevance to cysteine metabolism, changes in CDO activity may cause disease in humans. Research has found that elevated cysteine can by cytotoxic, neurotoxic, and excitotoxic. Abnormal or deficient CDO activity has been linked to Alzheimer's disease, Parkinson's disease, rheumatoid arthritis, and motor neuron diseases. In these diseases, patients display depressed sulfate levels, elevated fasting cysteine plasma concentrations, and other symptoms consistent with impaired cysteine oxidation. CDO deficiency and subsequent cysteine accumulation in the globus pallidus has been linked to Pantothenate kinase-associated neurodegeneration.

The expression of CDO is altered in cancer cells and methylation of the CDO1 (human cysteine dioxygenase type I) promoter gene was shown to occur in colon, breast, esophageal, lung, bladder, and stomach cancers. Silencing of CDO1 is a critical epigenetic event in breast cancer, leading to downregulation of CDO1 activity. In particular, decreased CDO1 activity causes increased hydrogen sulfide (H_{2}S), which has been connected to various diseases. These results suggest that CDO1 (human cysteine dioxygenase type I) acts as a tumor suppressor gene and may potentially serve as a biomarker for cancer.
