= Kilmer S. McCully =

American pathologist (1933–2025)

Kilmer Serjus McCully (December 23, 1933 – February 21, 2025) was an American pathologist who was the Chief of Pathology and Laboratory Medicine Services for the United States Department of Veterans Affairs Medical Center in West Roxbury, Massachusetts. He was the first to propose the homocysteine theory of cardiovascular disease, and is the author of the book, The Heart Revolution.

== Background ==
Born in Daykin, Nebraska, on December 23, 1933, McCully grew up in Alexandria, Virginia, and went on to attend Harvard College and Harvard Medical School.

== Career ==
McCully joined the faculty of Harvard Medical School in 1965. In 1969, he first began advancing his theory linking homocysteine to heart disease, but was met with a chilly reception from colleagues. His professional status suffered, and he left Harvard in 1979. He joined the VA in 1981. By the 1990s, additional research lent more credence to his theory, and his reputation improved. In 1999, he published the book The Heart Revolution.

== Personal life and death ==
In 1955, McCully married Annina Jacobs (d. 2023), and they had two children. He died from prostate cancer at his home in Winchester, Massachusetts, on February 21, 2025, at the age of 91.

== Selected papers ==
- "Vascular pathology of homocysteinemia: implications for the pathogenesis of arteriosclerosis", American Journal of Pathology. (1969), 56: pp. 111–128.
- "Chemical pathology of homocysteine", Annals of Clinical and Laboratory Science (1993), 23: pp. 477–493.
- "Homocysteine and vascular disease", Nature Medicine (1996), 2: pp. 386–389.
- "Homocysteine, folate, vitamin B6 and cardiovascular disease", Journal of the American Medical Association (1998), 279: pp. 392–393.
- "Atherosclerosis, serum cholesterol and the homocysteine theory: a study of 194 consecutive autopsies", The American Journal of the Medical Sciences. (1990), 299: pp. 217–221.
- "Keeping the Young-Elderly Healthy. Homocysteine, vitamins, and vascular disease prevention", American Journal of Clinical Nutrition. Nov. 2007 Vol. 86, No. 5, 1563S-1568S.
