= Aminomethylsulfonic acid =

Names
- IUPAC name Aminomethanesulfonic acid
- Other names Aminomethylenesulfonic acid

Identifiers
CAS Number	13881-91-9
3D model (JSmol)	Interactive image
ChEMBL	ChEMBL1741886
ChemSpider	75612
ECHA InfoCard	100.034.212
EC Number	237-649-6
PubChem CID	83791
UNII	OLA224Z482
CompTox Dashboard (EPA)	DTXSID2065670
- InChI: InChI=1S/CH5NO3S/c2-1-6(3,4)5/h1-2H2,(H,3,4,5) Key: OBESRABRARNZJB-UHFFFAOYSA-N
- SMILES: C(N)S(=O)(=O)O

Properties
Chemical formula	CH_{5}NO_{3}S
Molar mass	111.12 g·mol^{−1}
Appearance	White crystalline solid
Melting point	190–194 °C (374–381 °F; 463–467 K)

Hazards
- GHS labelling
Pictograms	(GHS05: Corrosive)
Signal word	Danger
Hazard statements	H314
Precautionary statements	P260, P264, P280, P301+P330+P331, P302+P361+P354, P304+P340, P305+P354+P338, P316, P321, P363, P405, P501

Related compounds
Related compounds	Taurine; Sulfamic acid; Methanesulfonic acid
- Except where otherwise noted, data are given for materials in their standard state (at 25 °C [77 °F], 100 kPa). Infobox references

Aminomethylsulfonic acid (also called aminomethylenesulfonic acid and aminomethanesulfonic acid) is an organic chemical compound, with amino (−NH_{2}) and sulfonic acid (−SO_{2}−OH) groups on the carbon atom. Its chemical formula is NH_{2}CH_{2}SO_{2}OH, and it has a molar mass of 111.12 g/mol.

== Synthesis ==
Aminomethane sulfonic acid can be made by the reaction between hexamethylenetetramine (hexamine) with sulfur dioxide (SO_{2}) in an aqueous environment.

== Properties ==
Aminomethanesulfonic acid is a corrosive solid. It could be thought of as the sulfonic acid analogue of glycine, just like aminomethylphosphonic acid is the phosphonic analogue of glycine. Its density is ~1.7 g/cm^{3}.

Aminomethanesulfonic acid appears as a white crystalline solid that dissolves readily in water. It exhibits amphoteric behavior, meaning it can act as either an acid or a base depending on the conditions. Heating the compound above 280 °C leads to decomposition, releasing sulfur dioxide and other gaseous products.

== Uses ==
Although aminomethanesulfonic acid has limited commercial use, it has been employed in research as a reagent and as a buffering agent. It has also been studied as a structural analog of taurine in biochemical research, helping to investigate metabolic pathways and sulfonic acid derivatives.

== Dangers ==
Aminomethanesulfonic acid can cause skin and eye burns; it is a dermatotoxin.
