= Peroxytaurine =

Product of oxidation of taurine

Identifiers
3D model (JSmol)	Interactive image
PubChem CID	129820791
- InChI: InChI=1S/C2H7NO4S/c3-1-2-8(5,6)7-4/h4H,1-3H2 Key: XYHRDVAQTMAJSY-UHFFFAOYSA-N
- SMILES: O=S(=O)(OO)CCN

Properties
Chemical formula	C_{2}H_{7}NO_{4}S
Molar mass	141.14 g·mol^{−1}

Related compounds
Related compounds	Taurine
- Except where otherwise noted, data are given for materials in their standard state (at 25 °C [77 °F], 100 kPa). Infobox references

Peroxytaurine appears to be the underresearched product of superoxide oxidation of taurine, including in cooked food.
