= Hyperhomocysteinemia =

- Other names: Hyperhomocysteinaemia
- Total plasma homocysteine
- Specialty: Nutrition, medical genetics, endocrinology

Hyperhoysteinemia is a medical condition characterized by an abnormally high level of total homocysteine (that is, including homocystine and homocysteine-cysteine disulfide) in the blood, conventionally described as above 15 μmol/L.

As a consequence of the biochemical reactions in which homocysteine is involved, deficiencies of vitamin B_{6}, folic acid (vitamin B_{9}), and vitamin B_{12} can lead to high homocysteine levels. Other possible causes of hyperhomocysteinemia include genetics, excessive methionine intake, and other diseases.

Hyperhomocysteinemia is typically managed with vitamin B_{6}, vitamin B_{9} and vitamin B_{12} supplementation. Hyperhomocysteinemia is a risk factor for cardiovascular disease; supplements of these vitamins may slightly reduce stroke outcome but not myocardial infarction, death from any cause or adverse events.

== Signs and symptoms ==
Elevated levels of homocysteine have been associated with a number of disease states: more than 100 adverse outcomes have been identified.

=== Cardiovascular risks ===
Elevated homocysteine is a known risk factor for cardiovascular disease as well as thrombosis. It has also been shown to be associated with microalbuminuria which is a strong indicator of the risk of future cardiovascular disease and renal dysfunction. Homocysteine degrades and inhibits the formation of the three main structural components of arteries: collagen, elastin and proteoglycans. In proteins, homocysteine permanently degrades cysteine disulfide bridges and lysine amino acid residues, affecting structure and function.

=== Neuropsychiatric illness ===
Evidence exists linking elevated homocysteine levels with vascular dementia and Alzheimer's disease. There is also evidence that elevated homocysteine levels and low levels of vitamin B6 and B12 are risk factors for mild cognitive impairment and dementia. Oxidative stress induced by homocysteine may also play a role in schizophrenia.

=== Bone health ===
Elevated levels of homocysteine have also been linked to increased fractures in elderly persons. Homocysteine auto-oxidizes and reacts with reactive oxygen intermediates, damaging endothelial cells and increasing the risk of thrombus formation.

=== Ectopia lentis ===
Homocystinuria is the second most common cause of heritable ectopia lentis. Homocystinuria is an autosomal recessive metabolic disorder most often caused by a near absence of cystathionine b-synthetase. It is associated with intellectual disability, osteoporosis, chest deformities, and increased risk of thrombotic episodes. Lens dislocation occurs in 90% of patients, and is thought to be due to decreased zonular integrity due to the enzymatic defect. Lens dislocation in homocystinuria is usually bilateral and in 60% of cases occurs in the inferior or nasal direction.

== Possible causes ==
=== B-enzyme deficiencies ===
A number of factors have been considered as causes of high homocysteine levels. Deficiencies of vitamins B_{6}, B_{9} and B_{12} have been implicated. Vitamin B_{12} is a cofactor for the enzyme methionine synthase, which participates in the biosynthesis of S-adenosylmethionine (SAM). Vitamin B_{12} deficiency prevents the 5-methyltetrahydrofolate (5-MTHF) form of folate from being converted into THF due to the "methyl trap". This disrupts the folate pathway and leads to an increase in homocysteine which damages cells (for example, damage to endothelial cells can result in increased risk of thrombosis).

=== Alcohol ===
Chronic consumption of alcohol may also result in increased plasma levels of homocysteine.

=== Tobacco ===
Smokeless tobacco may be a risk factor for hyperhomocysteinemia.

=== Genetic ===
Genetic defects in 5-MTHF reductase can lead to hyperhomocysteinemia. The most common polymorphisms are known as MTHFR C677T and MTR A2756G. The homozigote mutation G;G also called C;C (it is equivalent) occurs in about 10% of the population of european ethnicity (white caucasians). Elevations of homocysteine can also occur in the rare hereditary disease homocystinuria.

== Diagnosis ==
A blood test can be performed to quantify total homocysteine concentration in the plasma, of which approximately 80% is generally protein-bound. Classification of hyperhomocysteinemia is defined with respect to serum concentration as follows:

- Moderate: 15–30 nmol/mL (or μmol/L)
- Intermediate: 30–100 nmol/mL
- Severe: > 100 nmol/mL

If total homocysteine concentration is not found to be elevated, but clinical suspicion is still high, an oral methionine loading challenge several hours prior to quantification of homocysteine concentration may be used to increased sensitivity for marginal abnormalities of homocysteine metabolism. Fasting for 10 hours is sometimes recommended prior to measurement of homocysteine levels, but this may not be necessary for diagnostic yield.

== Treatment ==
Vitamins B_{6}, B_{9}, or B_{12} supplements (alone or combined) lower homocysteine level and might slightly reduce the risk of stroke but not of myocardial infarction compared to standard care or placebo in clinical trials. When combined with medicine to reduce blood pressure (antihypertensive drugs), it is not clear if treatments that lower homocysteine can help prevent a stroke in some people. Hypotheses have been offered to address the failure of homocysteine-lowering therapies to reduce cardiovascular events. When folic acid is given as a supplement, it may increase the build-up of arterial plaque. A second hypothesis involves the methylation of genes in vascular cells by folic acid and vitamin B_{12}, which may also accelerate plaque growth. Finally, altered methylation may catalyse l-arginine to asymmetric dimethylarginine, which is known to increase the risk of vascular disease.

== See also ==
- Homocystinuria
- Kilmer S. McCully
- DNA methylation
