= Cysteine sulfinic acid =

- Skeletal formula

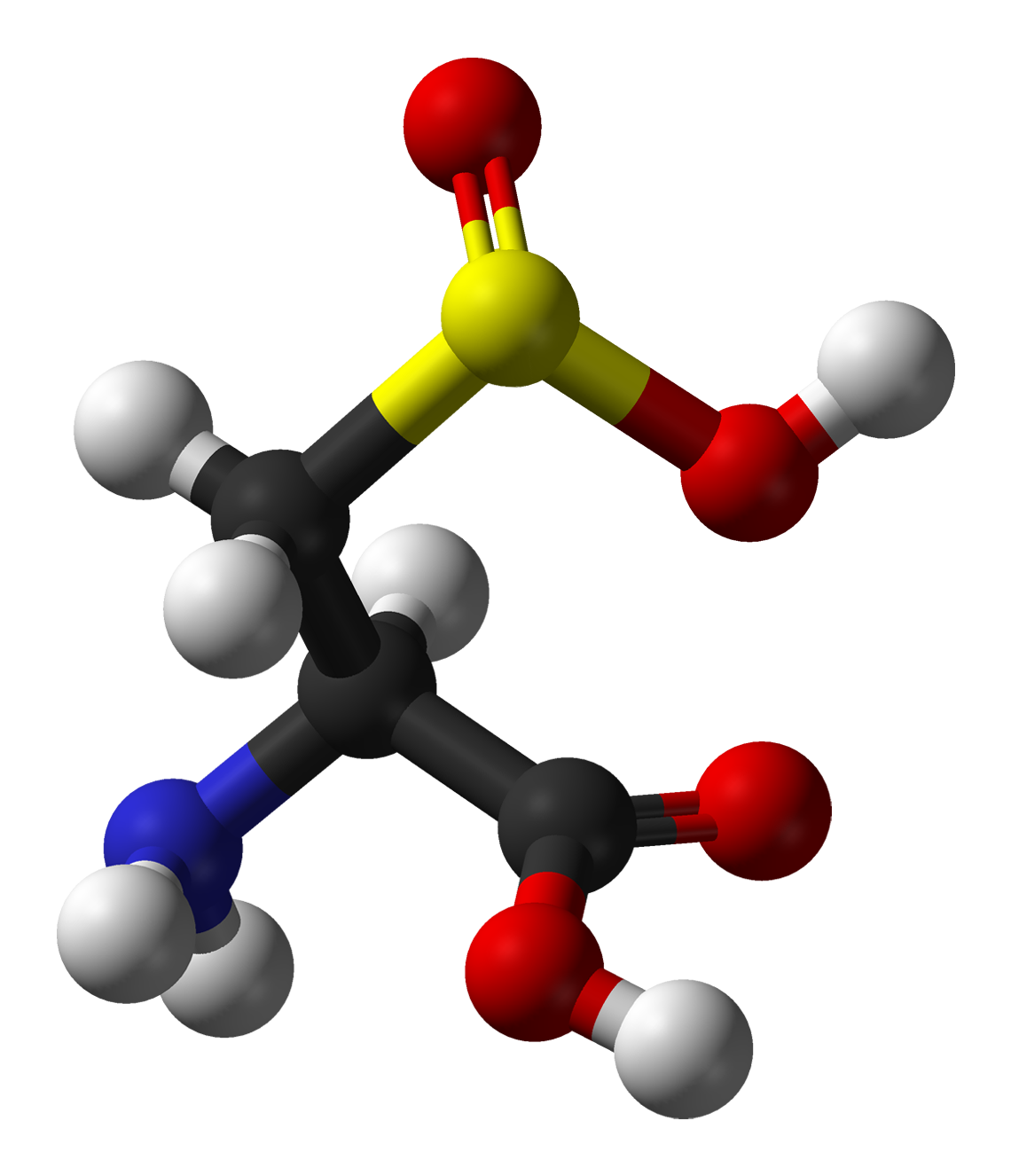
- Ball-and-stick model

Names
- IUPAC name 2-amino-3-sulfinopropanoic acid

Identifiers
CAS Number	1115-65-7; unspecified stereocentres: 2381-08-0
3D model (JSmol)	Interactive image
ChEBI	CHEBI:16345
ChEMBL	ChEMBL1160508
ChemSpider	1266065
DrugBank	DB02153
ECHA InfoCard	100.012.935
IUPHAR/BPS	5447
KEGG	C00606
MeSH	cysteine+sulfinic+acid
PubChem CID	1549098
UNII	UZY4HYK4ZX
CompTox Dashboard (EPA)	DTXSID20862546
- InChI: InChI=1S/C3H7NO4S/c4-2(3(5)6)1-9(7)8/h2H,1,4H2,(H,5,6)(H,7,8)/t2-/m0/s1 Key: ADVPTQAUNPRNPO-REOHCLBHSA-N; InChI=1/C3H7NO4S/c4-2(3(5)6)1-9(7)8/h2H,1,4H2,(H,5,6)(H,7,8)/t2-/m0/s1 Key: ADVPTQAUNPRNPO-REOHCLBHBM
- SMILES: O=C(O)[C@@H](N)CS(=O)O

Properties
Chemical formula	C_{3}H_{7}NO_{4}S
Molar mass	153.15698
- Except where otherwise noted, data are given for materials in their standard state (at 25 °C [77 °F], 100 kPa). verify (what is ?) Infobox references

Cysteine sulfinic acid is the organic compound with the nominal formula HO_{2}SCH_{2}CH(NH_{2})CO_{2}H. It is a rare example of an amino acid bearing a sulfinic acid functional group. It is a white solid that is soluble in water. Like most natural amino acids, it is chiral, only the L-enantiomer occurs in nature, and it exists as the zwitterion at neutral pH. It is an intermediate in cysteine metabolism. It is not a coded amino acid, but is produced post-translationally.

Cysteine is oxidized by cysteine dioxygenase to form cysteine sulfinic acid. Cysteine sulfinic acid, in turn, is decarboxylated by sulfinoalanine decarboxylase to form hypotaurine, which in turn is oxidized by hypotaurine dehydrogenase to yield taurine. Proteins containing this residue are found at the active site of some nitrile hydratases.

Cysteine sulfinic acid (2) is an intermediate in the conversion of cysteine (1) to taurine (4).

Peptides containing the cysteine sulfinic acid residue are substrates for cysteine sulfinic acid reductase.
