= Sulfinoalanine decarboxylase =

Enzyme in taurine metabolism

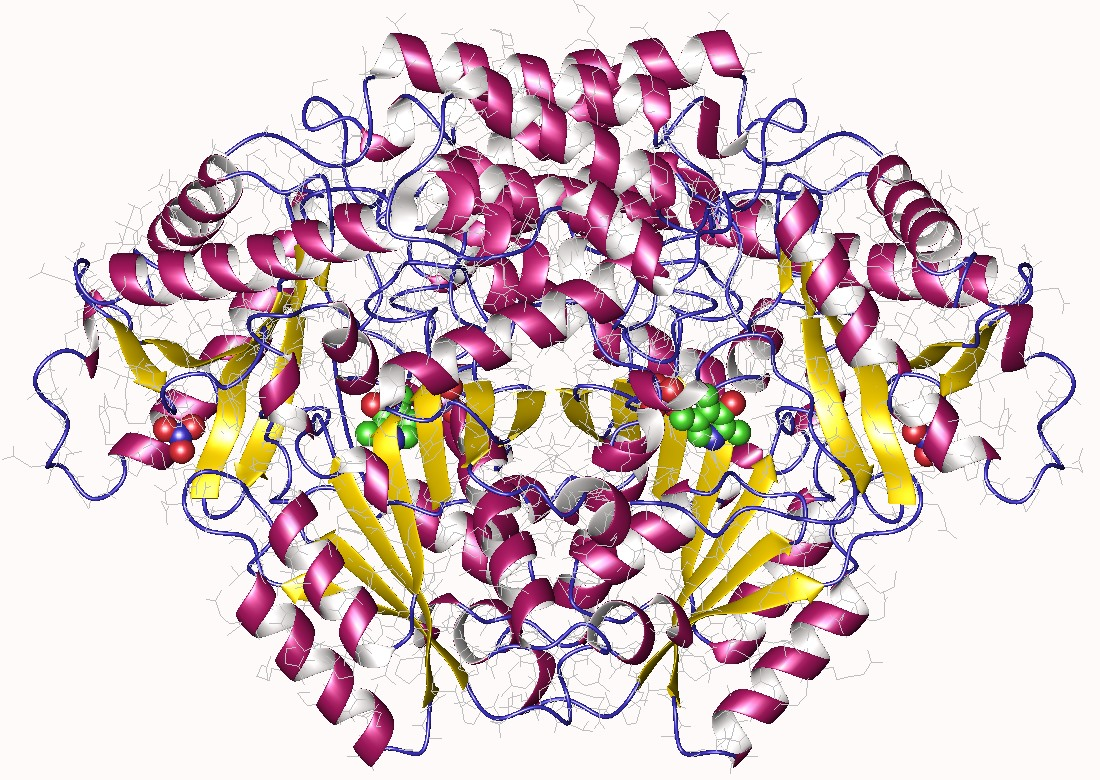
- Cysteine sulfinic acid decarboxylase homodimer, Human

Identifiers
- EC no.: 4.1.1.29

Databases
- BRENDA: enzyme data
- ExPASy: NiceZyme view
- KEGG: enzyme entry
- MetaCyc: metabolic pathway
- Rhea: reactions
- PDB structures: RCSB PDB PDBe PDBsum
- Gene Ontology: AmiGO / QuickGO
Search
- PMC: articles
- PubMed: articles
- NCBI: proteins

Sulfinoalanine decarboxylase (EC 4.1.1.29) is a mammalian enzyme that catalyzes the decarboxylation of cysteine sulfinic acid (3-sulfino-L-alanine) to hypotaurine and carbon dioxide:

cysteine sulfinic acid
CO_{2}
hypotaurine

Pyridoxal phosphate is used as a cofactor and the enzyme is part of the biochemical pathway to taurine.

This enzyme is a lyase, specifically a carboxy-lyases, which cleave carbon-carbon bonds. The systematic name of this enzyme class is 3-sulfino-L-alanine carboxy-lyase (hypotaurine-forming). Other names in use include cysteine-sulfinate decarboxylase, L-cysteinesulfinic acid decarboxylase, cysteine-sulfinate decarboxylase, CADCase/CSADCase, CSAD, cysteic decarboxylase, cysteinesulfinic acid decarboxylase, cysteinesulfinate decarboxylase, sulfoalanine decarboxylase, and 3-sulfino-L-alanine carboxy-lyase.

== Structural studies ==
As of late 2007, only one structure has been solved for this class of enzymes, with the PDB accession code PDB: 2JIS.
