= Taurine =

Aminosulfonic acid

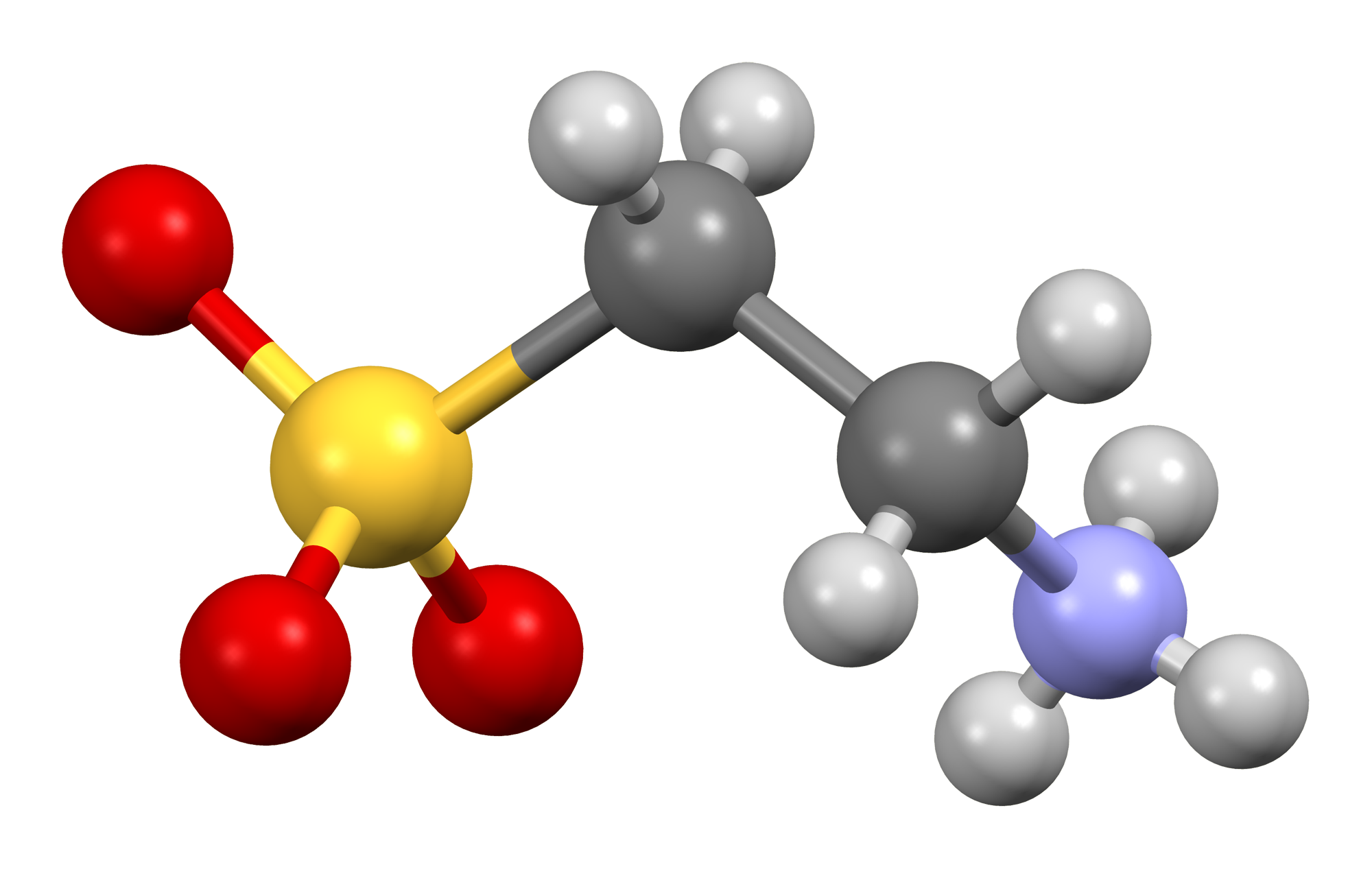

Names
- Preferred IUPAC name 2-Aminoethanesulfonic acid
- Other names Tauric acid

Identifiers
CAS Number	107-35-7
3D model (JSmol)	Interactive image
ChEBI	CHEBI:15891
ChEMBL	ChEMBL239243
ChemSpider	1091
DrugBank	DB01956
ECHA InfoCard	100.003.168
IUPHAR/BPS	2379
KEGG	D00047
PubChem CID	1123
UNII	1EQV5MLY3D
CompTox Dashboard (EPA)	DTXSID3021304
- InChI: InChI=1S/C2H7NO3S/c3-1-2-7(4,5)6/h1-3H2,(H,4,5,6) Key: XOAAWQZATWQOTB-UHFFFAOYSA-N; InChI=1/C2H7NO3S/c3-1-2-7(4,5)6/h1-3H2,(H,4,5,6) Key: XOAAWQZATWQOTB-UHFFFAOYAA
- SMILES: O=S(=O)(O)CCN

Properties
Chemical formula	C_{2}H_{7}NO_{3}S
Molar mass	125.14 g·mol^{−1}
Appearance	colorless or white solid
Density	1.734 g/cm^{3} (at −173.15 °C)
Melting point	305.11 °C (581.20 °F; 578.26 K) Decomposes into simple molecules
Acidity (pK_{a})	<0, 9.06

Related compounds
Related compounds	Sulfamic acid Aminomethanesulfonic acid Homotaurine
- Except where otherwise noted, data are given for materials in their standard state (at 25 °C [77 °F], 100 kPa). verify (what is ?) Infobox references

Taurine (/ˈtɔːriːn/; IUPAC: 2-aminoethanesulfonic acid) is a naturally occurring organic compound with the chemical formula H_{2}N−CH_{2}−CH_{2}−SO_{2}−OH in its non-zwitterionic form and H_{3}N^{+}−CH_{2}−CH_{2}−SO^{−}_{3} in its zwitterionic form, and is a non-proteinogenic amino sulfonic acid widely distributed in mammalian tissues and organs. Structurally, by containing a sulfonic acid group instead of a carboxylic acid group, it is not involved in protein synthesis but is still usually referred to as an amino acid; however, being non-proteinogenic, it is not a component of the genetic code and is distinguished from the protein-building α-amino acids.

Taurine is a major constituent of bile and can be found in the large intestine. It is named after Latin taurus, meaning bull or ox, as it was first isolated from ox bile in 1827 by German scientists Friedrich Tiedemann and Leopold Gmelin.

Although taurine is abundant in human organs, it is not an essential human dietary nutrient and is not included among nutrients with a recommended intake level. Among the diverse pathways by which natural taurine can be biosynthesized, its human pathways (primarily in the human liver) are from cysteine and/or methionine.

Taurine is commonly sold as a dietary supplement. Taurine is used as a food additive to meet essential dietary intake levels for cats, and supplemental dietary support for dogs and poultry.

== Discovery and name ==
Taurine was first isolated from ox bile in 1827 by German scientists Friedrich Tiedemann and Leopold Gmelin. Another German scientist Von H. Demarcay first used its common chemical name Taurine in 1838, derived from the Latin taurus (cognate to Ancient Greek ταῦρος, taûros) meaning bull or ox. It was subsequently identified in human bile in 1846 by Edmund Ronalds.

== Biological role ==
A number of physiological roles have been described for taurine. Taurine serves as an osmolyte, regulating cell volume. Taurine plays a role in cellular uptake of Ca2+ ions. Taurine is protective against glutamate-induced excitotoxicity. Taurine functions as an antioxidant and has been found to be protective in animal models of cardiovascular disease. It is known to do so, at least in part, through the neutralization of hypochlorous acid. It is also through its role as an antioxidant, that taurine is believed to enhance mitochondrial function, specifically by indirectly preventing the formation of superoxides produced in the electron transport chain.

== In nature ==
Taurine is widely distributed and abundant in nature, particularly in animal tissues. and further, as substrates in the biosynthesis of bile salts. Taurine concentrations in human cells may derive from at least three processes:

- biosynthesis from the sulfur amino acids (e.g., cysteine);
- active uptake by a taurine transporter; and
- the extent of its release from cells by a "volume-sensitive leak pathway".

Taurine is a major constituent of bile, and can be found in the large intestine. Its concentrations in land plants are low or undetectable, but up to a substantial wet weight has been found in algae.

== Chemical and biochemical features ==
Taurine exists as a zwitterion H_{3}N^{+}CH_{2}CH_{2}SO^{−}_{3}, as verified by X-ray crystallography. The sulfonic acid has a low pK_{a} ensuring that it is fully ionized to the sulfonate at the pHs found in the intestinal tract.

=== Biosynthesis ===
Among the diverse pathways by which natural taurine can be biosynthesized, its pathways in the human liver are from cysteine and/or methionine. With regard to the route from cysteine: mammalian taurine synthesis occurs in the liver via the cysteine sulfinic acid pathway. In this pathway, cysteine is first oxidized to its sulfinic acid, catalyzed by the enzyme cysteine dioxygenase. Cysteine sulfinic acid, in turn, is decarboxylated by sulfinoalanine decarboxylase to form hypotaurine. Hypotaurine is enzymatically oxidized to yield taurine by hypotaurine dehydrogenase.

Taurine is also produced by the transsulfuration pathway, which converts homocysteine into cystathionine. The cystathionine is then converted to hypotaurine by the sequential action of three enzymes: cystathionine gamma-lyase, cysteine dioxygenase, and cysteine sulfinic acid decarboxylase. Hypotaurine is then oxidized to taurine as described above.

A pathway for taurine biosynthesis from serine and sulfate is reported in microalgae, developing chicken embryos, and chick liver. Serine dehydratase converts serine to 2-aminoacrylate, which is converted to cysteic acid by 3′-phosphoadenylyl sulfate:2-aminoacrylate C-sulfotransferase. Cysteic acid is converted to taurine by cysteine sulfinic acid decarboxylase.

Oxidative degradation of cysteine to taurine

=== Chemical synthesis ===
Synthetic taurine is obtained by the ammonolysis of isethionic acid (2-hydroxyethanesulfonic acid), which in turn is obtained from the reaction of ethylene oxide with aqueous sodium bisulfite. A direct approach involves the reaction of aziridine with sulfurous acid.

In 1993, about 5000–6000 tonnes of taurine were produced for commercial purposes: 50% for pet food and 50% in pharmaceutical applications.

In the laboratory, taurine may be produced by alkylation of ammonia with bromoethanesulfonate salts. Taurine can be synthesized in the laboratory from aziridines through a ring-opening reaction. The synthesis of taurine in the lab has been patented.

== In food ==
Taurine occurs naturally in fish and meat. The mean daily intake from omnivore diets was determined to be approximately 58 mg (range 9–372 mg), and to be low or negligible from a vegan diet. Typical taurine consumption in the American diet is approximately 123–178 mg per day.

Taurine content of common foods
Food (100 g)	Taurine (mg), raw	Taurine (mg), cooked (Note: Cooking methods are as follow : "beef, veal, and pork were broiled; turkey was roasted; chicken and white fish were baked; bacon was pan-fried.")
Scallop	827	—
Mussel	655	—
Clam	520	—
Oyster	396	—
Squid	356	—
Turkey, dark meat	306	299
Turkey, light meat	30	11
Chicken, dark meat	169	199
Chicken, light meat	18	15
Beef	43	38
Pork, loin	61	57
Bacon, 3 slices	—	118
White fish	151	172
Low-fat plain yogurt	3.3	—
Cow's milk, whole	2.4	—
Fruits and fruit juices	0	—
Grains	0	—
Vegetables	0	—
Nuts and seeds	0	—
Legumes	0	—

Notes

Taurine is partially destroyed by heat in processes such as baking and boiling. This is a concern for cat food, as cats have a dietary requirement for taurine and can easily become deficient. Either raw feeding or supplementing taurine can satisfy this requirement.

Both lysine and taurine may mask the metallic flavor of potassium chloride, a salt substitute.

=== Breast milk ===
Taurine is present in breast milk, and has been added to many infant formulas as a measure of prudence since the early 1980s. However, this practice has never been rigorously studied, and as such it has yet to be proven to be necessary, or even beneficial.

=== Energy drinks and dietary supplements ===
Taurine is an ingredient in some energy drinks in amounts of 1–3 grams per serving.

== Research ==
Taurine is not regarded as an essential human dietary nutrient, and has not been assigned recommended intake levels. High-quality clinical studies to determine possible effects of taurine in the body or following dietary supplementation are absent from the literature. Preliminary human studies on the possible effects of taurine supplementation have been inadequate due to low subject numbers, inconsistent designs, and variable doses. In one review of preliminary human studies, use of taurine as a supplement had preventative effects on biomarkers of metabolic syndrome.

== Safety and toxicity ==
According to the European Food Safety Authority, taurine is "considered to be a skin and eye irritant and skin sensitiser, and to be hazardous if inhaled"; it may be safe to consume up to 6 grams of taurine per day. Other sources indicate that taurine is safe for supplemental intake in normal healthy adults at up to 3 grams per day.

A 2008 review found no documented reports of negative or positive health effects associated with the amount of taurine used in energy drinks, concluding, "The amounts of guarana, taurine, and ginseng found in popular energy drinks are far below the amounts expected to deliver either therapeutic benefits or adverse events".

== Animal dietary requirement ==
=== Cats ===
Cats lack the enzyme sulfinoalanine decarboxylase to produce taurine and must therefore acquire it from their diet. A taurine deficiency in cats can lead to retinal degeneration and eventually blindness ‒ a condition known as central retinal degeneration, as well as hair loss and tooth decay. Other effects of a diet lacking in taurine are dilated cardiomyopathy and reproductive failure in female cats.

Decreased plasma taurine concentration has been demonstrated to be associated with feline dilated cardiomyopathy. Unlike central retinal degeneration, the heart condition is reversible with supplementation.

Taurine is now a requirement of the Association of American Feed Control Officials (AAFCO) and any dry or wet food product labeled approved by the AAFCO should have a minimum of 0.1% taurine in dry food and 0.2% in wet food. Studies suggest the amino acid should be supplied at 10 mg/kg of bodyweight per day for domestic cats.

=== Other mammals ===
A number of other mammals also have a requirement for taurine. While the majority of dogs can synthesize taurine, case reports have described a singular American Cocker Spaniel, 19 Newfoundland dogs, and a family of Golden Retrievers suffering from taurine deficiency treatable with supplementation. Foxes on fur farms also appear to require dietary taurine. The rhesus, cebus, and cynomolgus monkeys each require taurine at least in infancy. The giant anteater also requires taurine.

=== Birds ===
Taurine appears to be essential for the development of passerine birds. Many passerines seek out taurine-rich spiders to feed their young, particularly just after hatching. Researchers compared the behaviours and development of birds fed a taurine-supplemented diet to a control diet and found the juveniles fed taurine-rich diets as neonates were much larger risk takers and more adept at spatial learning tasks. Under natural conditions, each blue tit nestling receives 1 mg of taurine per day from its parents.

Taurine can be synthesized by chickens. Supplementation has no effect on chickens raised under adequate lab conditions, but seems to help with growth under stresses such as heat and dense housing.

=== Fish ===
Species of fish, mostly carnivorous ones, show reduced growth and survival when the fish-based feed in their food is replaced with soy meal or feather meal. Taurine has been identified as the factor responsible for this phenomenon; supplementation of taurine to plant-based fish feed reverses these effects. Future aquaculture is expected to use more of these more environmentally-friendly protein sources, so supplementation would become more important.

The need of taurine in fish is conditional, differing by species and growth stage. The olive flounder, for example, has lower capacity to synthesize taurine compared to the rainbow trout. Juvenile fish are less efficient at taurine biosyntheis due to reduced cysteine sulfinate decarboxylase levels.

== Derivatives ==
- Taurine is used in the preparation of the anthelmintic drug, Totabin
- Taurolidine
- Taurocholic acid and tauroselcholic acid
- Tauromustine
- 5-Taurinomethyluridine and 5-taurinomethyl-2-thiouridine are modified uridines in (human) mitochondrial tRNA.
- Tauryl is the functional group attaching at the sulfur, 2-aminoethylsulfonyl.
- Taurino is the functional group attaching at the nitrogen, 2-sulfoethylamino.
- Thiotaurine
- Peroxytaurine which is a degradation product by both superoxide and heat degradation.

== See also ==
- Aminomethylsulfonic acid, a molecule similar to taurine but one methylene shorter
- Homotaurine (tramiprosate), precursor to acamprosate
- Taurates, a group of surfactants
