= Hypotaurine =

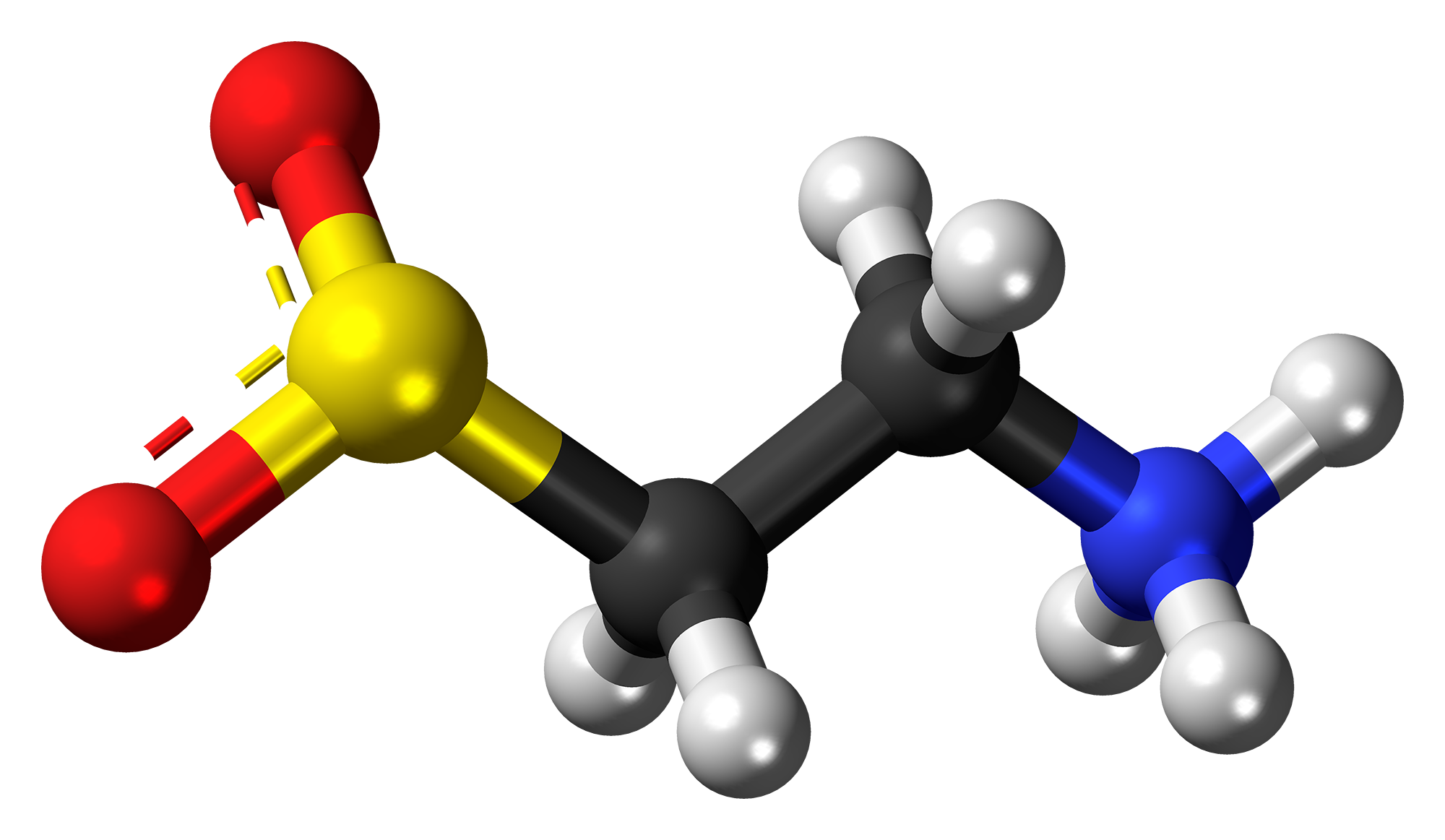

Names
- Preferred IUPAC name 2-Aminoethane-1-sulfinic acid

Identifiers
CAS Number	300-84-5
3D model (JSmol)	Interactive image
ChEBI	CHEBI:57853
ChemSpider	96959
ECHA InfoCard	100.155.825
KEGG	C00519
PubChem CID	107812
UNII	5L08GE4332
CompTox Dashboard (EPA)	DTXSID60861856 DTXSID8075380, DTXSID60861856
- InChI: InChI=1S/C2H7NO2S/c3-1-2-6(4)5/h1-3H2,(H,4,5) Key: VVIUBCNYACGLLV-UHFFFAOYSA-N; InChI=1/C2H7NO2S/c3-1-2-6(4)5/h1-3H2,(H,4,5) Key: VVIUBCNYACGLLV-UHFFFAOYAM
- SMILES: O=S(O)CCN

Properties
Chemical formula	C_{2}H_{7}NO_{2}S
Molar mass	109.15 g/mol
- Except where otherwise noted, data are given for materials in their standard state (at 25 °C [77 °F], 100 kPa). verify (what is ?) Infobox references

Hypotaurine is a sulfinic acid that is an intermediate in the biosynthesis of taurine. Like taurine, it also acts as an endogenous neurotransmitter via action on the glycine receptors. It is an osmolyte with antioxidant properties.

Hypotaurine is derived from cysteine (and homocysteine). In mammals, the biosynthesis of hypotaurine from cysteine occurs in the pancreas. In the cysteine sulfinic acid pathway, cysteine is first oxidized to its sulfinic acid, catalyzed by the enzyme cysteine dioxygenase. Cysteine sulfinic acid, in turn, is decarboxylated by sulfinoalanine decarboxylase to form hypotaurine. Hypotaurine is enzymatically oxidized to yield taurine by hypotaurine dehydrogenase.

Hypotaurine (3) is an intermediate in the conversion of cysteine (1) to taurine (4).
