= Homocysteine =

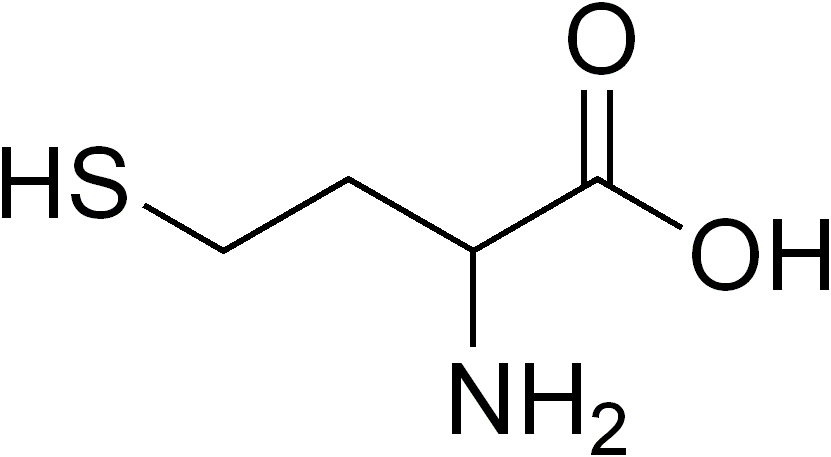
- Structural formula

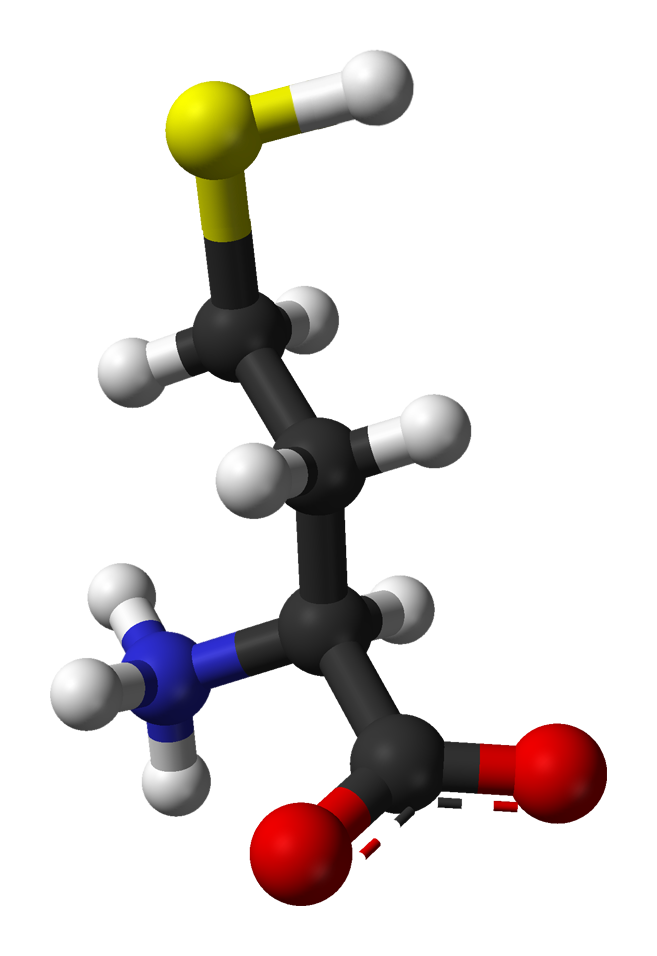
- Ball-and-stick model

Names
- IUPAC name 2-Amino-4-sulfanylbutanoic acid

Identifiers
CAS Number	454-29-5 (racemate); 6027-13-0 (L-isomer)
3D model (JSmol)	Interactive image
ChEBI	CHEBI:17230
ChEMBL	ChEMBL310604
ChemSpider	757
ECHA InfoCard	100.006.567
EC Number	207-222-9
KEGG	C05330
PubChem CID	778
UNII	S7IJP4A89K (racemate); 0LVT1QZ0BA (L-isomer)
CompTox Dashboard (EPA)	DTXSID70859946
- InChI: InChI=1S/C4H9NO2S/c5-3(1-2-8)4(6)7/h3,8H,1-2,5H2,(H,6,7) Key: FFFHZYDWPBMWHY-UHFFFAOYSA-N; InChI=1/C4H9NO2S/c5-3(1-2-8)4(6)7/h3,8H,1-2,5H2,(H,6,7) Key: FFFHZYDWPBMWHY-UHFFFAOYAS
- SMILES: C(CS)C(C(=O)O)N

Properties
Chemical formula	C_{4}H_{9}NO_{2}S
Molar mass	135.18 g·mol^{−1}
Appearance	White crystalline powder
Melting point	234–235 °C (453–455 °F; 507–508 K) (decomposes)
Solubility in water	soluble
log P	−2.56
Acidity (pK_{a})	2.25

Hazards
- GHS labelling
Pictograms	(GHS07: Exclamation mark)
Signal word	Warning
Hazard statements	H302
- Except where otherwise noted, data are given for materials in their standard state (at 25 °C [77 °F], 100 kPa). verify (what is ?) Infobox references

Homocysteine (symbol Hcy) is a non-proteinogenic α-amino acid. It is a homologue of the amino acid cysteine, differing by an additional methylene bridge (−CH_{2}−). It is biosynthesized from methionine by the removal of its terminal C^{ε} methyl group.

Although the production of homocysteine is a normal part of the metabolism of methionine, an excess of homocysteine can be harmful. There are two primary ways for organisms such as humans to metabolize homocysteine: remethylation and transsulfuration.

Remethylation adds a methyl group to the homocysteine molecule, converting homocysteine back into methionine. There are two known remethylation pathways. One pathway requires vitamin B_{9} (folate) and B_{12} (cobalamin), which drive the MTR (methionine synthase) and MTRR (methionine synthase reductase) enzymes. The other pathway uses TMG (trimethylglycine) to drive the BHMT (betaine-homocysteine methyltransferase) enzyme.

Transsulfuration converts homocysteine to cystathionine. This pathway requires vitamin B_{6} to drive the CBS (cystathionine beta synthase) enzyme. Cystathionine is the immediate precursor of the amino acid cysteine, which (along with glutamate and glycine), is incorporated into the tripeptide glutathione, a major antioxidant in the human body.

Homocysteine is therefore an important metabolic substrate. However, excessive levels of homocysteine can result in hyperhomocysteinemia, which is regarded as an indicator of cardiovascular disease risk. Homocysteine likely contributes to atherogenesis, which can result in ischemic injury. Therefore, hyperhomocysteinemia is a possible risk factor for coronary artery disease. Coronary artery disease occurs when an atherosclerotic plaque blocks blood flow to the coronary arteries, which supply the heart with oxygenated blood. Hyperhomocysteinemia has also been correlated with the occurrence of blood clots, heart attacks, and strokes, although it is unclear whether hyperhomocysteinemia is an independent risk factor for these conditions. Hyperhomocysteinemia has also been associated with early-term spontaneous abortions and with neural tube defects.

Zwitterionic forms of (S)-homocysteine (left) and (R)-homocysteine (right)

== Biosynthesis and biochemical roles ==
Two of homocysteine's main biochemical roles (homocysteine is seen in the left middle of the image). It can be synthesized from methionine and then converted back to methionine via the SAM cycle or used to create cysteine and alpha-ketobutyrate.

Homocysteine is biosynthesized naturally via a multi-step process. First, methionine receives an adenosine group from ATP, a reaction catalyzed by S-adenosyl-methionine synthetase, to give S-adenosyl methionine (SAM). SAM is a widely used source of methyl radicals and a cofactor for radical SAM enzymes. Transfer of the methyl group to an acceptor molecule results in the formation of S-adenosyl-homocysteine. Hydrolysis of this thioether gives L-homocysteine. L-Homocysteine reacts with tetrahydrofolate (THF) to give L-methionine.

=== Biosynthesis of cysteine ===
Mammals biosynthesize the amino acid cysteine via homocysteine. Cystathionine β-synthase catalyses the condensation of homocysteine and serine to give cystathionine. This reaction uses Pyridoxal phosphate (vitamin B_{6}) as a cofactor. Cystathionine γ-lyase then converts this double amino acid to cysteine, ammonia, and α-ketobutyrate. Bacteria and plants rely on a different pathway to produce cysteine, relying on O-acetylserine.

MTHFR metabolism: folate cycle, methionine cycle, trans-sulfuration and hyperhomocysteinemia - 5-MTHF: 5-methyltetrahydrofolate; 5,10-methyltetrahydrofolate; BAX: Bcl-2-associated X protein; BHMT: betaine-homocysteine S-methyltransferase; CBS: cystathionine beta synthase; CGL: cystathionine gamma-lyase; DHF: dihydrofolate (vitamin B9); DMG: dimethylglycine; dTMP: thymidine monophosphate; dUMP: deoxyuridine monophosphate; FAD^{+} flavine adenine dicucleotide; FTHF: 10-formyltetrahydrofolate; MS: methionine synthase; MTHFR: mehtylenetetrahydrofolate reductase; SAH: S-adenosyl-L-homocysteine; SAME: S-adenosyl-L-methionine; THF: tetrahydrofolate

=== Methionine salvage ===
Homocysteine can be recycled into methionine. This process uses N5-methyl tetrahydrofolate as the methyl donor and Methylcobalamin (vitamin B_{12})-related enzymes. More detail on these enzymes can be found in the article for methionine synthase.

=== Other reactions of biochemical significance ===
Homocysteine can cyclize to give homocysteine thiolactone, a five-membered heterocycle. Because of this "self-looping" reaction, homocysteine-containing peptides tend to cleave themselves by reactions generating oxidative stress.

Homocysteine also acts as an allosteric antagonist at Dopamine D_{2} receptors.

It has been proposed that both homocysteine and its thiolactone may have played a significant role in the appearance of life on the early Earth.

== Homocysteine levels ==
Total plasma homocysteine

Homocysteine levels typically are higher in men than women, and increase with age.

Common levels in Western populations are 10 to 12 μmol/L, and levels of 20 μmol/L are found in populations with low B-vitamin intakes or in the elderly (e.g., Rotterdam, Framingham).

It is decreased with methyl folate trapping, where it is accompanied by decreased methylmalonic acid, increased folate, and a decrease in formiminoglutamic acid. This is the opposite of MTHFR C677T mutations, which result in an increase in homocysteine.

Blood reference ranges for homocysteine:
Sex	Age	Lower limit	Upper limit	Unit	Elevated	Therapeutic target
Female	12–19 years	3.3	7.2	μmol/L	> 10.4 μmol/L or > 140 μg/dl	< 6.3 μmol/L or < 85 μg/dL
Female	12–19 years	45	100	μg/dL	> 10.4 μmol/L or > 140 μg/dl	< 6.3 μmol/L or < 85 μg/dL
Female	>60 years	4.9	11.6	μmol/L	> 10.4 μmol/L or > 140 μg/dl	< 6.3 μmol/L or < 85 μg/dL
Female	>60 years	66	160	μg/dL	> 10.4 μmol/L or > 140 μg/dl	< 6.3 μmol/L or < 85 μg/dL
Male	12–19 years	4.3	9.9	μmol/L	> 11.4 μmol/L or > 150 μg/dL	< 6.3 μmol/L or < 85 μg/dL
Male	12–19 years	60	130	μg/dL	> 11.4 μmol/L or > 150 μg/dL	< 6.3 μmol/L or < 85 μg/dL
Male	>60 years	5.9	15.3	μmol/L	> 11.4 μmol/L or > 150 μg/dL	< 6.3 μmol/L or < 85 μg/dL
Male	>60 years	80	210	μg/dL	> 11.4 μmol/L or > 150 μg/dL	< 6.3 μmol/L or < 85 μg/dL

The ranges above are provided as examples only; test results always should be interpreted using the range provided by the laboratory that produced the result.

== Elevated homocysteine ==
Abnormally high levels of homocysteine in the serum, above 15 μmol/L, are a medical condition called hyperhomocysteinemia. This has been claimed to be a significant risk factor for the development of a wide range of diseases, in total more than 100 including thrombosis, neuropsychiatric illness, in particular dementia and fractures. It also is found to be associated with microalbuminuria (moderately increased albuminuria), which is a strong indicator of the risk of future cardiovascular disease and renal dysfunction. Vitamin B_{12} deficiency, even when coupled with high serum folate levels, has been found to increase overall homocysteine concentrations as well.

Typically, hyperhomocysteinemia is managed with vitamin B_{6}, vitamin B_{9}, and vitamin B_{12} supplementation. However, supplementation with these vitamins does not appear to improve cardiovascular disease outcomes. An important consideration when specifically supplementing with folic acid (vitamin B_{9}) is to use a lower dosage. Over-supplementation with folic acid may produce negative health effects, including increased risk of cardiovascular disease and the development of cancer. It has been shown that the ideal dose of folic acid for lowering homocysteine levels is up to 1.2 mg per day. Higher dosages do not result in a greater decrease of homocysteine levels in the general population, which excludes individuals with certain mutations in the MTHFR gene.

Certain mutations in the MTR, MTHFR, and MTRR enzymes can cause hyperhomocysteinemia. This can be treated by supplementation with Methylfolate, P5P, and methylcobalamin, which are the bioactive forms of folate, Vitamin B_{6}, and vitamin B_{12} respectively. This treatment also significantly lowers LDL cholesterol levels in patients with low to moderate cardiovascular disease risk. However, the treatment does not significantly affect HDL cholesterol levels or lipid measurements.
