= Cystathionine gamma-lyase =

Protein found in humans

cystathionine γ-lyase
- Cysteine metabolism. Cystathionase catalyzes the lower reaction.

Identifiers
- EC no.: 4.4.1.1
- CAS no.: 9012-96-8

Databases
- BRENDA: enzyme data
- ExPASy: NiceZyme view
- KEGG: enzyme entry
- MetaCyc: metabolic pathway
- Rhea: reactions
- PDB structures: RCSB PDB PDBe PDBsum
- Gene Ontology: AmiGO / QuickGO
Search
- PMC: articles
- PubMed: articles
- NCBI: proteins

CTH
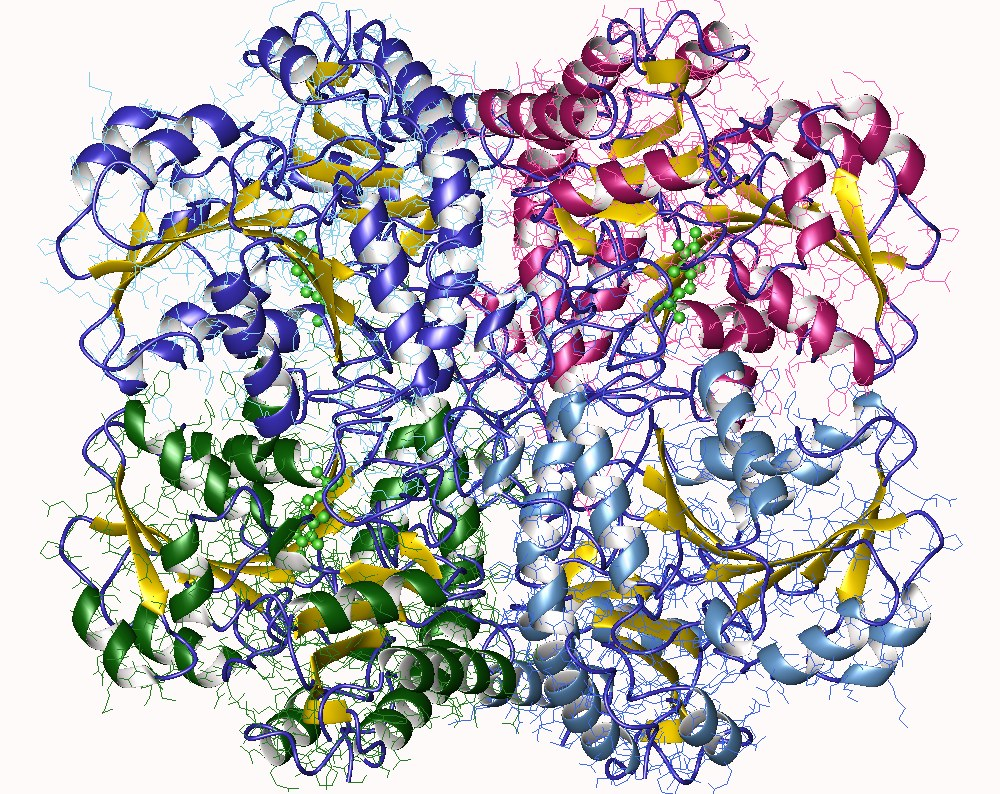

Identifiers
- Aliases: CTH, cystathionine gamma-lyase, CSE, CGL
- External IDs: OMIM: 607657; MGI: 1339968; GeneCards: CTH
Available structures
PDB	Ortholog search: PDBe RCSB
PDB	List of PDB id codes 2NMP, 3COG, 3ELP
Enzyme activity
EC #	BRENDA	ExPASy	KEGG	MetaCyc
4.4.1.1	↗	↗	↗	↗
4.4.1.2	↗	↗	↗	↗

Gene location (Human)
Chr.	Chromosome 1 (human)
Band	1p31.1	Start	70,411,218 bp
Band	1p31.1	End	70,439,851 bp

Gene location (Mouse)
Chr.	Chromosome 3 (mouse)
Band	3|3 H4	Start	157,599,885 bp
Band	3|3 H4	End	157,630,714 bp
RNA expression pattern
Bgee	Human / Mouse (ortholog); Top expressed in: right lobe of liver; retinal pigment epithelium; jejunal mucosa; sperm; cartilage tissue; left ovary; Epithelium of choroid plexus; kidney tubule; right ovary; duodenum / Top expressed in: proximal tubule; hepatobiliary system; liver; right kidney; morula; human kidney; ileum; colon; duodenum; zygote; More reference expression data
BioGPS	n/a
Gene ontology
Molecular function	cystathionine gamma-lyase activity; L-cystine L-cysteine-lyase (deaminating); calmodulin binding; protein binding; catalytic activity; lyase activity; pyridoxal phosphate binding; carbon-sulfur lyase activity; homocysteine desulfhydrase activity; L-cysteine desulfhydrase activity; cystathionine gamma-synthase activity; identical protein binding
Cellular component	cytosol; extracellular exosome; cytoplasm
Biological process	transsulfuration; positive regulation of aortic smooth muscle cell differentiation; cysteine biosynthetic process via cystathionine; cysteine metabolic process; negative regulation of apoptotic signaling pathway; protein sulfhydration; negative regulation of apoptotic process; cellular amino acid biosynthetic process; endoplasmic reticulum unfolded protein response; cysteine biosynthetic process; positive regulation of NF-kappaB transcription factor activity; hydrogen sulfide biosynthetic process; sulfur amino acid catabolic process; positive regulation of I-kappaB kinase/NF-kappaB signaling; protein homotetramerization; protein-pyridoxal-5-phosphate linkage via peptidyl-N6-pyridoxal phosphate-L-lysine; 'de novo' L-methionine biosynthetic process; cellular response to leukemia inhibitory factor
Sources:Amigo / QuickGO
Orthologs
Databases	NCBI: entry; OMA: entry
Species	Human	Mouse
Entrez	1491	107869
Ensembl	ENSG00000116761	ENSMUSG00000028179
UniProt	P32929	Q8VCN5
RefSeq (mRNA)	NM_001190463; NM_001902; NM_153742	NM_145953
RefSeq (protein)	NP_001177392; NP_001893; NP_714964	NP_666065
Location (UCSC)	Chr 1: 70.41 – 70.44 Mb	Chr 3: 157.6 – 157.63 Mb
PubMed search
- Wikidata
View/Edit Human	View/Edit Mouse

The enzyme cystathionine γ-lyase (EC 4.4.1.1, CTH or CSE; also cystathionase; systematic name L-cystathionine cysteine-lyase (deaminating; 2-oxobutanoate-forming)) is an enzyme which in humans is encoded by the gene CTH. CTH enzymes break down cystathionine into cysteine, 2-oxobutanoate (α-ketobutyrate), and ammonia:

L-cystathionine + H_{2}O = L-cysteine + 2-oxobutanoate + NH_{3} (overall reaction)

(1a) L-cystathionine = L-cysteine + 2-aminobut-2-enoate
(1b) 2-aminobut-2-enoate = 2-iminobutanoate (spontaneous)
(1c) 2-iminobutanoate + H_{2}O = 2-oxobutanoate + NH_{3} (spontaneous)

Pyridoxal phosphate is a prosthetic group of this enzyme.

Cystathionine γ-lyase also catalyses the following elimination reactions:

- L-homoserine to form H_{2}O, NH_{3} and 2-oxobutanoate
- L-cystine, producing cysteine hydropersulfide, pyruvate and NH_{3}
- L-cysteine producing pyruvate, NH_{3} and H_{2}S

In some bacteria and mammals, including humans, this enzyme takes part in generating hydrogen sulfide. Hydrogen sulfide is one of a few gases that was recently discovered to have a role in cell signaling in the body.

== Enzyme mechanism ==
Cystathionase uses pyridoxal phosphate to facilitate the cleavage of the sulfur-gamma carbon bond of cystathionine, resulting in the release of cysteine. The lysine residue reforms the internal aldimine by kicking off α-iminobutyric acid. Afterwards the external ketimine is hydrolyzed, causing the formation of α-ketobutyrate.

The amino group on cystathionine is deprotonated and undergoes a nucleophilic attack of the internal aldimine. An additional deprotonation by a general base results in the formation of the external aldimine and removal of the lysine residue. The basic lysine residue is then able to deprotonate the alpha carbon, pushing electron density into the nitrogen of the pyridine ring. Pyridoxal phosphate is necessary to stabilize this carbanionic intermediate; otherwise the proton's pKa would be too high. The beta carbon is then deprotonated, creating an alpha-beta unsaturation and pushing a lone pair onto the aldimine nitrogen. To reform the aldimine, this lone pair pushes back down, cleaving the sulfur-gamma carbon bond, resulting in the release of cysteine.

A pyridoxamine derivative of vinyl glyoxylate remains after the gamma elimination. The lone pair from the pyridine nitrogen pushes electron density to the gamma carbon, which is protonated by lysine. Lysine then attacks the external aldimine, pushing electron density to the beta carbon, which is protonated by a general acid. The imine is then hydrolyzed to release α-ketobutyrate. Deprotonation of the lysine residue causes ammonia to leave, thus completing the catalytic cycle.

Cystathionine gamma lyase also shows gamma-synthase activity depending on the concentrations of reactants present. The mechanisms are the same until they diverge after formation of the vinyl glyoxylate derivative. In the gamma synthase mechanism, the gamma carbon is attacked by a sulfur nucleophile, resulting in the formation of a new sulfur-gamma carbon bond.

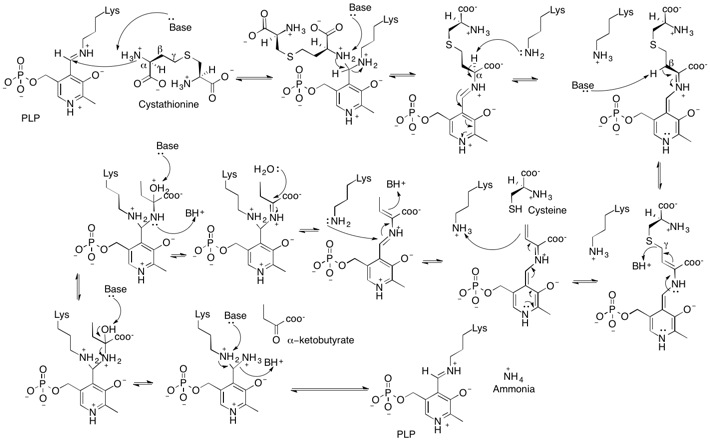
The mechanism for cystathionine gamma lyase

== Enzyme structure ==
Cystathionine γ-lyase is a member of the Cys/Met metabolism PLP-dependent enzymes family. Other members include cystathionine γ synthase, cystathionine β lyase, and methionine γ lyase. It is also a member of the broader aspartate aminotransferase family. Like many other PLP-dependent enzymes, cystathionine γ-lyase is a tetramer with D2 symmetry.

Pyridoxal phosphate is bound in the active site by Lys^{212}.

== Disease relevance ==
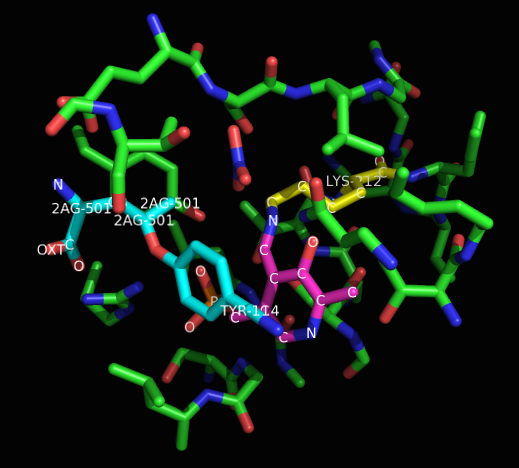
Inhibited cystathionase active site. The inhibitor and Tyr^{114} are in light blue, PLP in purple, and Lys^{121} in yellow.

Cysteine is the rate-limiting substrate in the synthetic pathway for glutathione in the eye. Glutathione is an antioxidant that protects crystallins in the eye from reactive oxygen species; denatured crystallins can lead to cataracts. Cystathionase is also a target for reactive oxygen species. Thus as cystathionase is oxidized, its activity decreases, causing a decrease in cysteine and, in turn, glutathione in the eye, leading to a decrease in antioxidant availability, causing a further decrease in cystathionase activity. Deficiencies in cystathionase activity have also been shown to contribute to glutathione depletion in patients with cancer and AIDS.

Mutations and deficiencies in cystathionase are associated with cystathioninuria. The mutations T67I and Q240E weaken the enzyme's affinity for pyridoxal phosphate, the co-factor vital to enzymatic function. Low levels of H_{2}S have also been associated with hypertension in mice.

Excessive levels of H_{2}S, due to increased activity of cystathionase, are associated with endotoxemia, acute pancreatitis, hemorrhagic shock, and diabetes mellitus.

L-Propargylglycine

Propargylglycine and β-cyanoalanine are two irreversible inhibitors of cystathionase used to treat elevated H_{2}S levels. Mechanistically, the amino group of propargylglycine attacks the aldimine to form an external aldimine. The β position of the alkyne is then deprotonated to form the allene, which is then attacked by the phenol of Tyr^{114}. The internal aldimine can regenerate, but the newly created vinyl ether sterically hinders the active site, blocking cysteine from attacking pyridoxal phosphate.

== Regulation ==
H_{2}S decreases transcription of cystathionase at concentrations between 10 and 80 μM. However, transcription is increased by concentrations near 120 μM, and inhibited completely at concentrations in excess of 160 μM.

== See also ==
- Cysteine metabolism
