= 3-mercaptopyruvate sulfurtransferase =

Class of enzymes

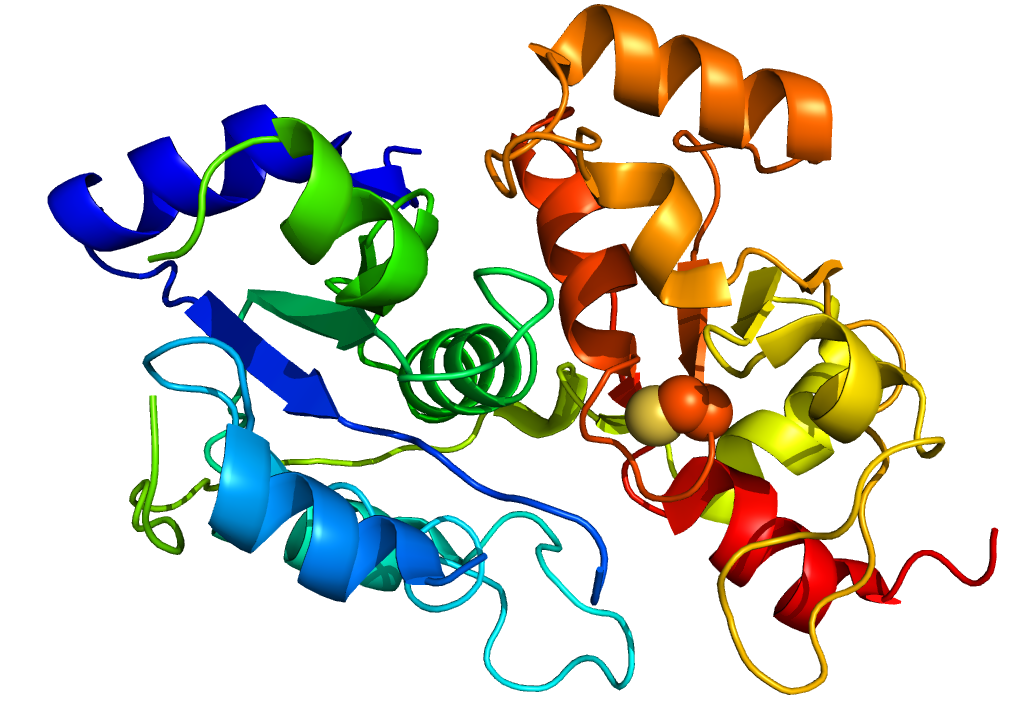
- Crystallographic structure of 3-mercaptopyruvate sulfurtransferase based on PDB: 3OLH. Rainbow colored (N-terminus blue and C-terminus red). The catalytic cysteine is depicted by spheres.

Identifiers
- EC no.: 2.8.1.2
- CAS no.: 9026-05-5

Databases
- BRENDA: enzyme data
- ExPASy: NiceZyme view
- KEGG: enzyme entry
- MetaCyc: metabolic pathway
- Rhea: reactions
- PDB structures: RCSB PDB PDBe PDBsum
- Gene Ontology: AmiGO / QuickGO
Search
- PMC: articles
- PubMed: articles
- NCBI: proteins

3-mercaptopyruvate sulfurtransferase (EC 2.8.1.2) is an enzyme that catalyzes the overall chemical reaction:

3-mercaptopyruvic acid
+ reduced
thioredoxin
H_{2}S
pyruvic acid
+ oxidised
thioredoxin

MPST

Identifiers
- Aliases: MPST, MST, TST2, TUM1, mercaptopyruvate sulfurtransferase
- External IDs: OMIM: 602496; MGI: 2179733; GeneCards: MPST
Available structures
PDB	Ortholog search: PDBe RCSB
PDB	List of PDB id codes 3OLH, 4JGT
Enzyme activity
EC #	BRENDA	ExPASy	KEGG	MetaCyc
2.8.1.2	↗	↗	↗	↗

Gene location (Human)
Chr.	Chromosome 22 (human)
Band	22q12.3	Start	37,019,635 bp
Band	22q12.3	End	37,029,821 bp

Gene location (Mouse)
Chr.	Chromosome 15 (mouse)
Band	15|15 E1	Start	78,290,616 bp
Band	15|15 E1	End	78,298,213 bp
RNA expression pattern
Bgee	Human / Mouse (ortholog); Top expressed in: mucosa of transverse colon; right lobe of liver; body of pancreas; mucosa of ileum; left ovary; right ovary; duodenum; body of stomach; gastric mucosa; skin of abdomen / Top expressed in: muscle of thigh; granulocyte; lip; ventricular zone; yolk sac; esophagus; lens; skeletal muscle tissue; superior frontal gyrus; zygote; More reference expression data
BioGPS	More reference expression data
Gene ontology
Molecular function	transferase activity; thiosulfate sulfurtransferase activity; 3-mercaptopyruvate sulfurtransferase activity; identical protein binding
Cellular component	cytoplasm; neuron projection; cytosol; cell junction; synapse; extracellular exosome; mitochondrion; mitochondrial matrix
Biological process	transsulfuration; liver development; cyanate catabolic process; response to toxic substance; kidney development; spinal cord development; hydrogen sulfide biosynthetic process; sulfur amino acid catabolic process
Sources:Amigo / QuickGO
Orthologs
Databases	NCBI: entry; OMA: entry
Species	Human	Mouse
Entrez	4357	246221
Ensembl	ENSG00000128309	ENSMUSG00000071711
UniProt	P25325	Q99J99
RefSeq (mRNA)	NM_001013436; NM_001013440; NM_001130517; NM_021126; NM_001369904 NM_001369905	NM_001162492; NM_001162493; NM_138670
RefSeq (protein)	NP_001013454; NP_001123989; NP_066949; NP_001356833; NP_001356834	NP_001155964; NP_001155965; NP_619611
Location (UCSC)	Chr 22: 37.02 – 37.03 Mb	Chr 15: 78.29 – 78.3 Mb
PubMed search
- Wikidata
View/Edit Human	View/Edit Mouse

The enzyme is of interest because it provides a pathway for detoxification of cyanide, especially since it occurs widely in the cytosol and is broadly distributed. It participates in cysteine metabolism and is encoded by the MPST gene.

== Nomenclature ==
This enzyme is a transferases, specifically the sulfurtransferases. Its systematic name is 3-mercaptopyruvate:cyanide sulfurtransferase. This enzyme is also called beta-mercaptopyruvate sulfurtransferase and in the older literature, human liver rhodanese.

== Structure ==
=== Gene ===
The MPST gene lies on the chromosome location of 22q12.3 and consists of 6 exons. Alternatively spliced transcript variants encoding the same protein have been identified.

=== Protein ===
The encoded cytoplasmic protein is a member of the rhodanese family but is not rhodanese itself, which is found only in mitochondria. MPST protein consists of 317 amino acid residues and weighs 35250Da. MPST contains two rhodanese domains with similar secondary structures suggesting a common evolutionary origin. The catalytic cysteine residue only exists in the C-terminal rhodanese domain. The protein can function as a monomer or as a disulfide-linked homodimer.

== Function and mechanism ==
The biological function of MPST remains unclear. It may be involved in cyanide detoxification, biosynthesis of thiosulfate, production of the signalling molecule hydrogen sulfide, or the degradation of cysteine.

MPST reacts with 3-MP to convert a cysteinyl residue to the hydropersulfide-containing intermediate:

RSH + HSCH_{2}C(O)CO_{2}^{−} → RSSH + CH_{3}C(O)CO_{2}^{−}

The hydropersulfide group is labile, and can transfer S to other groups, such as cyanide. It is also susceptible to reduction to release hydrogen sulfide. Thiols and protein Cys residues can intercept the hydropersulfide intermediate, resulting in the formation of low-molecular weight hydropersulfides (such as glutathione persulfide) as well as persulfidated proteins.

H_{2}S is produced from l-cysteine by cystathionine-γ-lyase (CSE) and MPST. l-cysteine-dependent production of H_{2}S by MPST is a two-step reaction. In the first step, cysteine transaminase converts l-cysteine along with α-ketoglutarate into 3-mercaptopyruvate (3-MP). Subsequently, MPST converts 3-MP into H_{2}S. MPST catalyzes the transfer of a sulfur atom from mercaptopyruvate to sulfur acceptors like cyanides or thiol compounds. Thus it is also considered to participate in cysteine degradation. MPST generates H_{2}S in coronary artery, mediating its effects through direct modulation of NO, namely vasodilation. This has important implications for H_{2}S-based therapy in healthy and diseased coronary arteries.

== Biological significance ==
MPST is expressed in a number of tissues, including kidney, liver, lung, heart, muscle, spleen, and brain.

3-Mercaptopyruvate (3-MP), along with α-ketoglutarate, is derived from cysteine by the action of an aminotransferase. Thus MPST may participate in cysteine degradation.

=== Biomedical ===
==== Hydrogen sulfide production ====
H_{2}S is produced from MPST (as well as by cystathionine-γ-lyase). MPST generates H_{2}S in coronary artery, mediating its effects through direct modulation of NO, namely vasodilation. This has important implications for H_{2}S-based therapy in healthy and diseased coronary arteries.

==== Mercaptolactate-cysteine disulfiduria ====
Deficiency in MPST has been found related to mercaptolactate-cysteine disulfiduria (or Ampola syndrome), a rare inheritable disorder associated with oversecretion of mercaptolactate-cysteine disulfide in urine. Fewer than 1,000 people have this rare disorder in the United States. Symptoms and signs include: high forehead, seizures, arachnodactyly, genu valgum, hypoplasia of the ear cartilage and umbilical hernia.

==== Bladder cancer ====
Immunoreactivity for MPST was detected in malignant uroepithelium and muscular layer of bladder cancer samples. Protein levels and catalytic activities of MPST increased with the increase of malignant degrees in human bladder tissues and human urothelial cell carcinoma of bladder (UCB) cell lines and this may promote the application of MPST novel enzymes to UCB diagnosis or treatment.

== Further reading (mainly older literature) ==
- Fiedler H, Wood JL (September 1956). "Specificity studies on the beta-mercaptopyruvate-cyanide transsulfuration system". The Journal of Biological Chemistry. 222 (1): 387–97. doi:10.1016/S0021-9258(19)50803-1. PMID 13367011.
- Hylin JW, Wood JL (August 1959). "Enzymatic formation of polysulfides from mercaptopyruvate". The Journal of Biological Chemistry. 234 (8): 2141–4. doi:10.1016/S0021-9258(18)69881-3. PMID 13673028.
- Sorbo B (May 1957). "Enzymic transfer of sulfur from mercaptopyruvate to sulfate or sulfinates". Biochimica et Biophysica Acta. 24 (2): 324–9. doi:10.1016/0006-3002(57)90201-9. PMID 13436433.
- Vachek H, Wood JL (January 1972). "Purification and properties of mercaptopyruvate sulfur transferase of Escherichia coli". Biochimica et Biophysica Acta (BBA) - Enzymology. 258 (1): 133–46. doi:10.1016/0005-2744(72)90973-4. PMID 4550801.
- Van den Hamer CJ, Morell AG, Scheinberg IH (May 1967). "A study of the cooper content of beta-mercaptopyruvate trans-sulfurase". The Journal of Biological Chemistry. 242 (10): 2514–6. doi:10.1016/S0021-9258(18)95992-2. PMID 6026243.
