= Uroplakin-1a =

Mammalian protein found in Homo sapiens

UPK1A

Identifiers
- Aliases: UPK1A, TSPAN21, UP1A, UPIA, UPKA, uroplakin 1A
- External IDs: OMIM: 611557; MGI: 98911; GeneCards: UPK1A

Gene location (Human)
Chr.	Chromosome 19 (human)
Band	19q13.12	Start	35,666,517 bp
Band	19q13.12	End	35,678,481 bp

Gene location (Mouse)
Chr.	Chromosome 7 (mouse)
Band	7 B1|7 18.78 cM	Start	30,302,517 bp
Band	7 B1|7 18.78 cM	End	30,312,272 bp
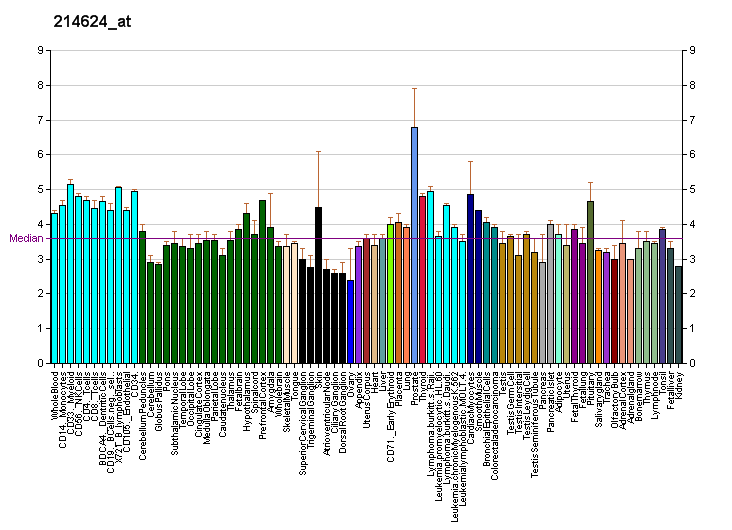
RNA expression pattern
Bgee	Human / Mouse (ortholog); Top expressed in: gonad; urinary bladder; mucosa of urinary bladder; vagina; testicle; skin of leg; skin of abdomen; urethra; prostate; oral cavity / Top expressed in: transitional epithelium of urinary bladder; genital tubercle; urethra; morula; right kidney; tail of embryo; left colon; embryo; salivary gland; brown adipose tissue; More reference expression data
BioGPS	More reference expression data
Gene ontology
Molecular function	protein homodimerization activity; protein binding
Cellular component	integral component of membrane; plasma membrane; integral component of plasma membrane; extracellular exosome; apical plasma membrane; endoplasmic reticulum; membrane; cell surface; apical plasma membrane urothelial plaque
Biological process	cell surface receptor signaling pathway; epithelial cell differentiation; protein complex oligomerization
Sources:Amigo / QuickGO
Orthologs
Databases	NCBI: entry; OMA: entry
Species	Human	Mouse
Entrez	11045	109637
Ensembl	ENSG00000105668	ENSMUSG00000006313
UniProt	O00322	Q9D132
RefSeq (mRNA)	NM_007000; NM_001281443	NM_026815
RefSeq (protein)	NP_001268372; NP_008931	NP_081091
Location (UCSC)	Chr 19: 35.67 – 35.68 Mb	Chr 7: 30.3 – 30.31 Mb
PubMed search
- Wikidata
View/Edit Human	View/Edit Mouse

Uroplakin-1a (UP1a) is a protein that in humans is encoded by the UPK1A gene.

The protein encoded by this gene is a member of the transmembrane 4 superfamily, also known as the tetraspanin family. Most of these members are cell-surface proteins that are characterized by the presence of four hydrophobic domains.

The proteins mediate signal transduction events that play a role in the regulation of cell development, activation, growth and motility. This encoded protein is found in the asymmetrical unit membrane (AUM) where it can complex with other transmembrane 4 superfamily proteins.

UP1a may play a role in normal bladder epithelial physiology, possibly in regulating membrane permeability of superficial umbrella cells or in stabilizing the apical membrane through AUM/cytoskeletal interactions.
