= Sulfanegen =

Names
- IUPAC name 2,5-Dihydroxy-1,4-dithiane-2,5-dicarboxylic acid

Identifiers
CAS Number	80003-64-1 (Na^{+} salt); 1309654-46-3
3D model (JSmol)	Interactive image
ChEBI	CHEBI:138170
ChemSpider	29395474
PubChem CID	24830990
UNII	14338V25RC
CompTox Dashboard (EPA)	DTXSID301045729
- InChI: InChI=1S/C6H8O6S2/c7-3(8)5(11)1-13-6(12,2-14-5)4(9)10/h11-12H,1-2H2,(H,7,8)(H,9,10) Key: GYZMXMSJOZUNEQ-UHFFFAOYSA-N; InChI=1/C6H8O6S2/c7-3(8)5(11)1-13-6(12,2-14-5)4(9)10/h11-12H,1-2H2,(H,7,8)(H,9,10) Key: GYZMXMSJOZUNEQ-UHFFFAOYAO
- SMILES: C1C(SCC(S1)(C(=O)O)O)(C(=O)O)O

Properties
Chemical formula	C_{6}H_{8}O_{6}S_{2}
Molar mass	240.24 g·mol^{−1}
- Except where otherwise noted, data are given for materials in their standard state (at 25 °C [77 °F], 100 kPa). Infobox references

Sulfanegen is an experimental antidote for cyanide poisoning. It is being studied as a prodrug for 3-mercaptopyruvic acid (3-MP). 3-MP has been studied as a potential treatment for cyanide poisoning, but the half-life is too short for it to be clinically effective. Instead, alternative chemicals such as sulfanegen, the hemithioacetal cyclic dimer of 3-MP, are being evaluated that produce 3-MP in vivo to compensate for the short half-life of 3-MP itself.

Sulfanegen has been shown to be effective in animal studies. It is being studied as the disodium salt, sulfanegen sodium, and the triethanolamine salt, sulfanegen TEA. One advantage various sulfanegen formulations have over existing treatments for acute cyanide poisoning is that they might be administered by intramuscular injection or orally rather than by intravenous infusion.
