= Cyanide poisoning =

Broad-spectrum poisoning

Cyanide poison
- Other names: Cyanide toxicity, hydrocyanic acid poison
- Cyanide ion
- Specialty: Toxicology, emergency medicine
- Symptoms: Early: headache, dizziness, fast heart rate, shortness of breath, vomiting Later: seizures, slow heart rate, low blood pressure, loss of consciousness, cardiac arrest
- Usual onset: Few minutes
- Causes: Exposure to Cyanide compounds
- Risk factors: House fire, metal polishing, certain insecticides, eating seeds such as from almonds
- Diagnostic method: Based on symptoms, high blood lactate
- Treatment: Decontamination, supportive care (100% oxygen), hydroxocobalamin

Cyanide poisoning is poisoning that results from exposure to any of a number of forms of cyanide. Early symptoms include headache, dizziness, fast heart rate, shortness of breath, and vomiting. This phase may then be followed by seizures, slow heart rate, low blood pressure, loss of consciousness, and cardiac arrest. Onset of symptoms usually occurs within a few minutes. Some survivors have long-term neurological problems.

Toxic cyanide-containing compounds include hydrogen cyanide gas and cyanide salts, such as potassium cyanide. Poisoning is relatively common following breathing in smoke from a house fire. Other potential routes of exposure include workplaces involved in metal polishing, certain insecticides, the medication sodium nitroprusside, and certain seeds such as those of apples and apricots. Liquid forms of cyanide can be absorbed through the skin. Cyanide ions interfere with cellular respiration, resulting in the body's tissues being unable to use oxygen.

Diagnosis is often difficult. It may be suspected in a person following a house fire who has a decreased level of consciousness, low blood pressure, or high lactic acid. Blood levels of cyanide can be measured but take time. Levels of 0.5–1 mg/L are mild, 1–2 mg/L are moderate, 2–3 mg/L are severe, and greater than 3 mg/L generally result in death.

If exposure is suspected, the person should be removed from the source of the exposure and decontaminated. Treatment involves supportive care and giving the person 100% oxygen. Hydroxocobalamin (vitamin B12_{a}) appears to be useful as an antidote and is generally first-line. Sodium thiosulfate may also be given. Historically, cyanide has been used for mass suicide and it was used for genocide by Nazi Germany.

== Signs and symptoms ==
=== Acute exposure ===
If hydrogen cyanide is inhaled, it can cause a coma with seizures, apnea, and cardiac arrest, with death following in a matter of seconds. At lower doses, loss of consciousness may be preceded by general weakness, dizziness, headaches, vertigo, confusion, and perceived difficulty in breathing. At the first stages of unconsciousness, breathing is often sufficient or even rapid, although the state of the person progresses towards a deep coma, sometimes accompanied by pulmonary edema, and finally cardiac arrest. A cherry red skin color that darkens may be present as the result of increased venous hemoglobin oxygen saturation. Despite the similar name, cyanide does not directly cause cyanosis. A fatal dose for humans is on average 1.52 mg/kg of body weight, with the lowest recorded lethal dose being 0.56 mg/kg. Other sources claim a lethal dose is 1–3 mg per kg body weight for vertebrates.

=== Chronic exposure ===
Exposure to lower levels of cyanide over a long period, e.g. after use of improperly processed cassava roots, results in increased blood cyanide levels, which can result in weakness and a variety of symptoms, including permanent paralysis, nervous lesions, hypothyroidism, and miscarriages. Other effects include mild liver and kidney damage.

== Causes ==
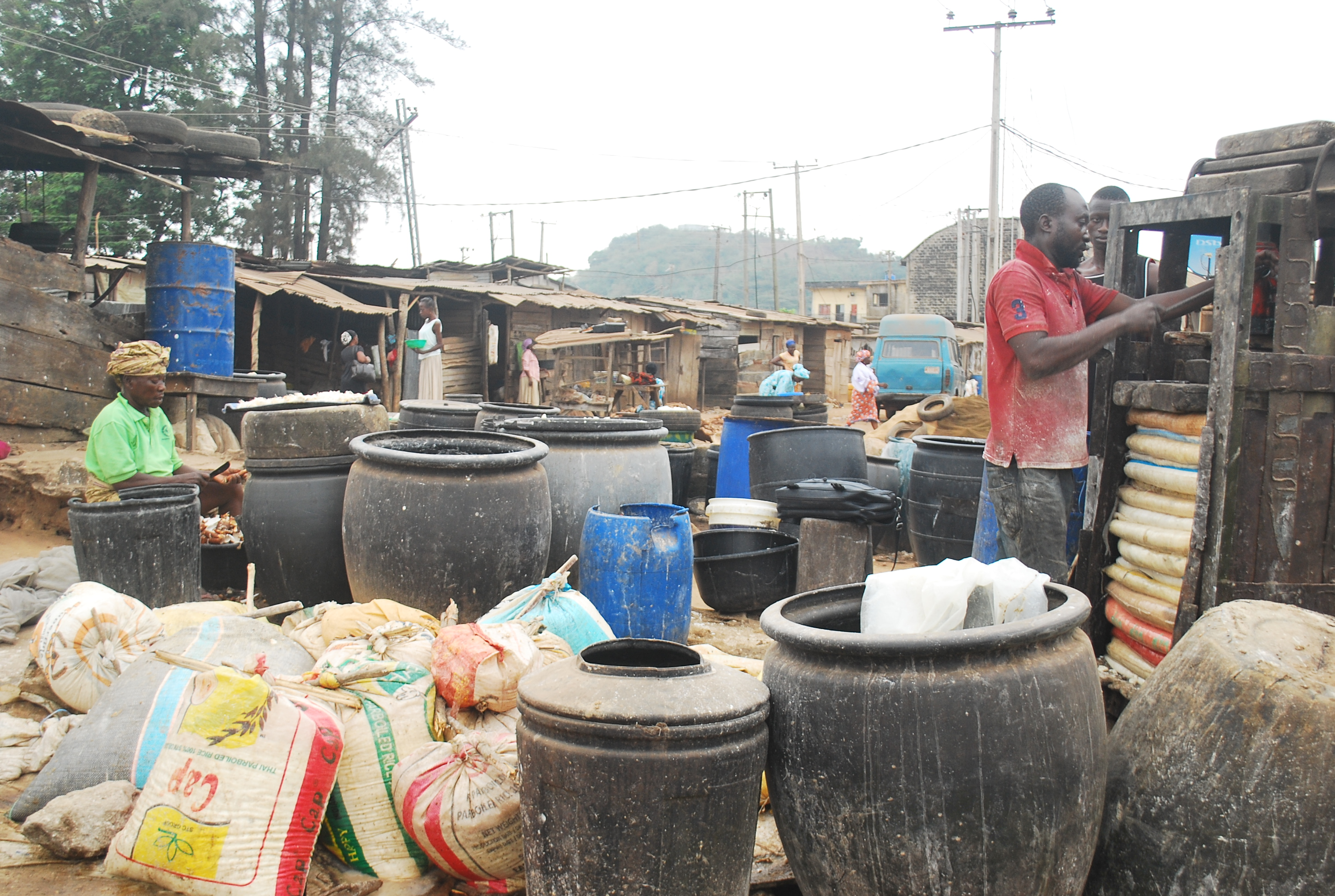
Removal of cyanide poison from cassava in Nigeria

Cyanide poisoning can result from the ingestion of cyanide salts, imbibing prussic acid, skin absorption of prussic acid, intravenous infusion of nitroprusside for hypertensive crisis, or the inhalation of hydrogen cyanide gas. The last typically occurs through one of three mechanisms:

- The gas is directly released from canisters (e.g., as part of a pesticide, insecticide, or Zyklon B).
- It is generated on site by reacting potassium cyanide or sodium cyanide with sulfuric acid (e.g., in a modern American gas chamber).
- Fumes arise during a building fire or any similar scenario involving the burning of polyurethane, vinyl or other polymer products that required nitriles in their production.

As potential contributing factors, cyanide is present in:

- Tobacco smoke.
- Certain seeds or kernels such as those of almonds, apricots, apples, oranges, and flaxseed.
- Foods including cassava (also known as tapioca, yuca or manioc) and bamboo shoots.

As a potential harm-reduction factor, vitamin B12, in the form of hydroxocobalamin (also spelled hydroxycobalamin), might reduce the negative effects of chronic exposure; whereas, a deficiency might worsen negative health effects following exposure to cyanide.

== Mechanism ==
Cyanide is a potent cytochrome c oxidase (COX, a.k.a. Complex IV) inhibitor, causing asphyxiation of cells. As such, cyanide poisoning is a form of histotoxic hypoxia, because it interferes with the ability of cells to take or use oxygen in aerobic respiration.

Specifically, cyanide binds to the heme a3-CuB binuclear center of COX (and thus is a non-competitive inhibitor of it). This prevents electrons passing through COX from being transferred to O_{2}, which not only blocks the mitochondrial electron transport chain, it also interferes with the pumping of a proton out of the mitochondrial matrix which would otherwise occur at this stage. Therefore, cyanide interferes not only with aerobic respiration but also with the ATP synthesis pathway it facilitates, owing to the close relationship between those two processes.

One antidote for cyanide poisoning, nitrite (i.e., via amyl nitrite), works by converting ferrohemoglobin to ferrihemoglobin, which can then compete with COX for free cyanide (as the cyanide will bind to the iron in its heme groups instead). Ferrihemoglobin cannot carry oxygen, but the amount of ferrihemoglobin that can be formed without impairing oxygen transport is much greater than the amount of COX in the body.

Cyanide is a broad-spectrum poison because the reaction it inhibits is essential to aerobic metabolism; COX is found in multiple forms of life. However, susceptibility to cyanide is far from uniform across affected species; for instance, plants have an alternative electron transfer pathway available that passes electrons directly from ubiquinone to O_{2}, which confers cyanide resistance by bypassing COX.

== Diagnosis ==
Lactate is produced by anaerobic glycolysis when oxygen concentration becomes too low for the normal aerobic respiration pathway. Cyanide poisoning inhibits aerobic respiration and therefore increases anaerobic glycolysis which causes a rise of lactate in the plasma. A lactate concentration above 10 mmol per liter is an indicator of cyanide poisoning, as defined by the presence of a blood cyanide concentration above 40 μmol per liter. Lactate levels greater than 6 mmol/L after reported or strongly suspected pure cyanide poisoning, such as cyanide-containing smoke exposure, suggests significant cyanide exposure. However, lactate alone is not diagnostic of cyanide poisoning because lactosis is also triggered by other things, including mitochondrial dysfunction.

Methods of detection include colorimetric assays such as the Prussian blue test, the pyridine-barbiturate assay, also known as the "Conway diffusion method" and the taurine fluorescence-HPLC but like all colorimetric assays these are prone to false positives. Lipid peroxidation resulting in "TBARS", an artifact of heart attack produces dialdehydes that cross-react with the pyridine-barbiturate assay. Meanwhile, the taurine-fluorescence-HPLC assay used for cyanide detection is identical to the assay used to detect glutathione in spinal fluid.

Cyanide and thiocyanate assays have been run with mass spectrometry (LC/MS/MS), which are considered specific tests. Since cyanide has a short half-life, the main metabolite, thiocyanate is typically measured to determine exposure.

== Treatment ==
=== Decontamination ===
Decontamination of people exposed only to the gas form of hydrogen cyanide requires removal of the outer clothing and the washing of their hair. Those exposed to liquids or powders generally require full decontamination.

=== Antidote ===
The International Programme on Chemical Safety issued a survey (IPCS/CEC Evaluation of Antidotes Series) that lists the following antidotal agents and their effects: oxygen, sodium thiosulfate, amyl nitrite, sodium nitrite, 4-dimethylaminophenol, hydroxocobalamin, and dicobalt edetate ('Kelocyanor'), as well as several others. Another historical antidote is 'solutions A and B' (a solution of ferrous sulfate in aqueous citric acid, and aqueous sodium carbonate, respectively). However, such use is no longer recommended.

The United States standard cyanide antidote kit first uses a small inhaled dose of amyl nitrite, followed by intravenous sodium nitrite, followed by intravenous sodium thiosulfate. Hydroxocobalamin was approved for use in the US in late 2006 and is available in Cyanokit antidote kits. Sulfanegen TEA, which could be delivered to the body through an intra-muscular (IM) injection, detoxifies cyanide and converts the cyanide into thiocyanate, a less toxic substance. Alternative methods of treating cyanide intoxication are used in other countries.

The Irish Health Service Executive (HSE) has recommended against the use of solutions A and B because of their limited shelf life, potential to cause iron poisoning, and limited applicability (effective only in cases of cyanide ingestion, whereas the main modes of poisoning are inhalation and skin contact). The HSE has also questioned the usefulness of amyl nitrite due to storage/availability problems, risk of abuse, and lack of evidence of significant benefits. It also states that the availability of kelocyanor at the workplace may mislead doctors into treating a patient for cyanide poisoning when this is an erroneous diagnosis. The HSE no longer recommends a particular cyanide antidote.

Agent	Description
Nitrites	The nitrites oxidize some of the hemoglobin's iron from the ferrous state to the ferric state, converting the hemoglobin into methemoglobin. Cyanide binds avidly to methemoglobin, forming cyanmethemoglobin, thus releasing cyanide from cytochrome oxidase. Treatment with nitrites is not innocuous as methemoglobin cannot carry oxygen, and severe methemoglobinemia may need to be treated in turn with methylene blue. (Note: Methylene blue has historically been used as an antidote to cyanide poisoning, but is not a preferred therapy due to its theoretical risk of worsening of cyanide symptoms by displacement of cyanide from methemoglobin, allowing the toxin to bind to tissue electron transport chains.)
Thiosulfate	The evidence for sodium thiosulfate's use is based on animal studies and case reports: the small quantities of cyanide present in dietary sources and in cigarette smoke are normally metabolized to relatively harmless thiocyanate by the mitochondrial enzyme rhodanese (thiosulfate cyanide sulfurtransferase), which uses thiosulfate as a substrate. However, this reaction occurs too slowly in the body for thiosulfate to be adequate by itself in acute cyanide poisoning. Thiosulfate must therefore be used in combination with nitrites.
Hydroxocobalamin	Hydroxocobalamin, a form (or vitamer) of vitamin B_{12} made by bacteria, and sometimes denoted vitamin B_{12a}, is used to bind cyanide to form the harmless cyanocobalamin form of vitamin B_{12}.
4-Dimethylaminophenol	4-Dimethylaminophenol (4-DMAP) has been proposed in Germany as a more rapid antidote than nitrites with (reportedly) lower toxicity. 4-DMAP is used currently by the German military and by the civilian population. In humans, intravenous injection of 3 mg/kg of 4-DMAP produces 35 percent methemoglobin levels within 1 minute. Reportedly, 4-DMAP is part of the US Cyanokit, while it is not part of the German Cyanokit due to side effects (e. g. hemolysis).
Dicobalt edetate	Cobalt ions, being chemically similar to iron ions, can also bind cyanide. One current cobalt-based antidote available in Europe is dicobalt edetate or dicobalt-EDTA, sold as Kelocyanor. This agent chelates cyanide as the cobalticyanide. This drug provides an antidote effect more quickly than formation of methemoglobin, but a clear superiority to methemoglobin formation has not been demonstrated. Cobalt complexes are quite toxic, and there have been accidents reported in the UK where patients have been given dicobalt-EDTA by mistake based on a false diagnosis of cyanide poisoning. Because of its side effects, it should be reserved only for patients with the most severe degree of exposure to cyanide; otherwise, nitrite/thiosulfate is preferred.
Glucose	Evidence from animal experiments suggests that coadministration of glucose protects against cobalt toxicity associated with the antidote agent dicobalt edetate. For this reason, glucose is often administered alongside this agent (e.g. in the formulation 'Kelocyanor'). It has also been anecdotally suggested that glucose is itself an effective counteragent to cyanide, reacting with it to form less toxic compounds that can be eliminated by the body. One theory on the apparent immunity of Grigori Rasputin to cyanide was that his killers put the poison in sweet pastries and madeira wine, both of which are rich in sugar; thus, Rasputin would have been administered the poison together with massive quantities of antidote. One study found a reduction in cyanide toxicity in mice when the cyanide was first mixed with glucose. However, as yet glucose on its own is not an officially acknowledged antidote to cyanide poisoning.
3-Mercaptopyruvate prodrugs	The most widely studied cyanide-metabolizing pathway involves utilization of thiosulfate by the enzyme rhodanese, as stated above. In humans, however, rhodanese is concentrated in the kidneys (0.96 units/mg protein) and liver (0.15 u/mg), with concentrations in lung, brain, muscle and stomach not exceeding 0.03 U/ml. In all these tissues, it is found in the mitochondrial matrix, a site of low accessibility for ionized, inorganic species, such as thiosulfate. This compartmentalization of rhodanese in mammalian tissues leaves major targets of cyanide lethality, namely, the heart and central nervous system, unprotected. Rhodanese is also found in red blood cells, but its relative importance has not been clarified.) A different cyanide-metabolizing pathway, 3-mercaptopyruvate sulfurtransferase (3-MPST, EC 2.8.1.2), which is more widely distributed in mammalian tissues than rhodanese, is being explored. 3-MPST converts cyanide to thiocyanate, using the cysteine catabolite, 3-mercaptopyruvate (3-MP). However, 3-MP is extremely unstable chemically. Therefore, a prodrug, sulfanegen sodium (2,5-dihydroxy-1,4-dithiane-2,5-dicarboxylic acid disodium salt), which hydrolyzes into 2 molecules of 3-MP after being administered orally or parenterally, is being evaluated in animal models.
Oxygen therapy	Oxygen therapy is not a cure in its own right. However, the human liver is capable of metabolizing cyanide quickly in low doses (smokers breathe in hydrogen cyanide, but it is such a small amount and metabolized so fast that it does not accumulate).

== History ==
=== Fires ===
The República Cromañón nightclub fire broke out in Buenos Aires, Argentina on 30 December 2004, killing 194 people and leaving at least 1,492 injured. Most of the victims died from inhaling poisonous gases, including carbon monoxide. After the fire, the technical institution INTI found that the level of toxicity due to the materials and volume of the building was 225 ppm of cyanide in the air. A lethal dose for rats is between 150 ppm and 220 ppm, meaning the air in the building was highly toxic.

On 27 January 2013, a fire at the Kiss nightclub in the city of Santa Maria, in the south of Brazil, caused the poisoning of hundreds of young people by cyanide released by the combustion of soundproofing foam made with polyurethane. By March 2013, 242 fatalities were confirmed. It is the deadliest fire incident involving cyanide poisoning.

=== Gas chambers ===
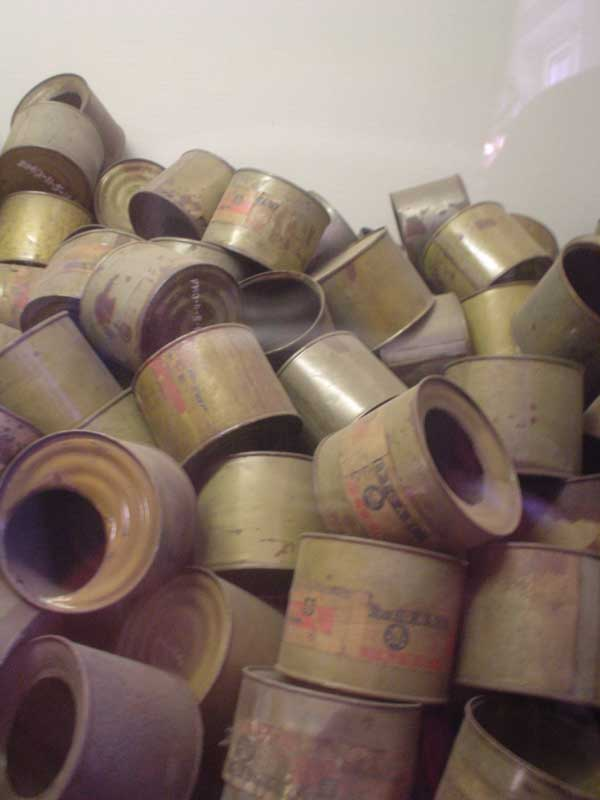
Empty Zyklon B canisters, found by the Soviets in January 1945 at Auschwitz

Research of hydrogen cyanide by chemists Carl Wilhelm Scheele and Claude Bernard would become central to understanding the lethality of future gas chambers. In early 1942, Zyklon B, which contains hydrogen cyanide, emerged as the preferred killing tool of Nazi Germany for use in extermination camps during the Holocaust. The chemical was used to murder roughly one million people in gas chambers installed in extermination camps at Auschwitz-Birkenau, Majdanek, and elsewhere. Most of the people who were murdered were Jews, and by far the majority of these murders took place at Auschwitz. (Note: Soviet officials initially stated that over four million people were murdered using Zyklon B at Auschwitz, but this figure was later proven to be greatly exaggerated.) The constituents of Zyklon B were manufactured by several companies under licenses for Degesch, a corporation co-owned by IG Farben, Degussa and Th. Goldschmidt AG. It was sold to the German Army and the Schutzstaffel (SS) by the distributors Heli and Testa, with Heli supplying it to concentration camps at Mauthausen, Dachau, and Buchenwald and Testa to Auschwitz and Majdanek. Camps also occasionally bought Zyklon B directly from the manufacturers. Of the 729 tonnes of Zyklon B sold in Germany in 1942–44, 56 tonnes (about eight percent of domestic sales) were sold to concentration camps. Auschwitz received 23.8 tonnes, of which six tonnes were used for fumigation. The remainder was used in the gas chambers or lost to spoilage (the product had a stated shelf life of only three months). Testa conducted fumigations for the Wehrmacht and supplied them with Zyklon B. They also offered courses to the SS in the safe handling and use of the material for fumigation purposes. In April 1941, the German agriculture and interior ministries designated the SS as an authorized applier of the chemical, and thus they were able to use it without any further training or governmental oversight.

Hydrogen cyanide gas has been used for judicial execution in some states of the United States, where cyanide was generated by reaction between potassium cyanide (or sodium cyanide) dropped into a compartment containing sulfuric acid, directly below the chair in the gas chamber.

=== Suicide ===
Cyanide salts are sometimes used as fast-acting suicide devices. Cyanide reacts at a higher level with high stomach acidity.

- Viktor Meyer, 19th-century German chemist, died by suicide in 1897 after taking cyanide.
- On 26 January 1904, company promoter and swindler Whitaker Wright died by ingesting cyanide in a court anteroom immediately after being convicted of fraud.
- Gustav Wied, Danish novelist, poet, and playwright, committed suicide in 1914.
- Badal Gupta, a revolutionary from Bengal, who launched an attack on the Writers' Building in Kolkata, consumed cyanide in 1930 immediately after the attack.
- Pritilata Waddedar, an Indian revolutionary nationalist, took cyanide in 1932 to avoid capture by Indian Imperial Police, British India.
- In February 1937, the Uruguayan short story writer Horacio Quiroga died by drinking cyanide at a hospital in Buenos Aires.
- In 1937, polymer chemist Wallace Carothers died by drinking cyanide.
- Erwin Rommel (1944), Adolf Hitler's wife Eva Braun (1945), and Nazi leaders Heinrich Himmler (1945), possibly Martin Bormann (1945), and Hermann Göring (1946) all died by ingesting cyanide. Pure liquid prussic acid (a historical name for hydrogen cyanide) was the favored suicide agent of Nazi Germany.
- It is speculated that, in 1954, Alan Turing used an apple that had been injected with a solution of cyanide to die after being convicted of having a homosexual relationship, which was illegal at the time in the United Kingdom, and forced to undergo hormonal castration to avoid prison. An inquest determined that Turing's death from cyanide poisoning was a suicide, although this has been disputed.
- In 1958, Douglas Kelley, a former United States Army Military Intelligence Corps, ingested a capsule of potassium cyanide. He was an officer who served as chief psychiatrist at Nuremberg Prison during the first months of the Nuremberg trials. Kelley examined 22 high ranking officials of the Nazi party, including Adolf Hitler's second-in-command Hermann Göring and Hitler's deputy Rudolf Hess.
- Members of the Liberation Tigers of Tamil Eelam, whose insurgency lasted from 1983 to 2009, used to wear cyanide vials around their necks with the intention of taking them if captured by the government forces.
- On 22 June 1977, Moscow, Aleksandr Dmitrievich Ogorodnik, a Soviet diplomat accused of spying on behalf of the Colombian Intelligence Agency and the US Central Intelligence Agency, was arrested by Soviet authorities. During the interrogations, Ogorodnik offered to write a full confession and asked for his pen. Inside the pen cap was a hidden cyanide pill, provided by his CIA handlers to be used in the event of his capture. Ogorodnik bit the pen cap, releasing the cyanide and causing Ogorodnik to die before he hit the floor, according to the Soviets.
- On 18 November 1978, 909 people died in Jonestown, some of them from apparent cyanide poisoning, in an event termed "revolutionary suicide" by Jones and some members on an audio tape of the event and in prior discussions. The poisonings in Jonestown followed the murder of five others by Temple members at Port Kaituma, including United States Congressman Leo Ryan, an act that Jones ordered. Four other Temple members died by murder-suicide in Georgetown at Jones' command.
- On 6 June 1985, serial killer Leonard Lake died in custody after having ingested cyanide pills he had sewn into his clothes.
- Jason Altom, a promising graduate student in the lab of Nobel Prize–winning chemist EJ Corey at Harvard, died after drinking potassium cyanide in 1998.
- MP Prasad, a goldsmith in Palakkad, India, died by suicide in 2006. Prasad is reportedly the only person to have documented the taste of potassium cyanide.
- On 28 June 2012, Wall Street trader Michael Marin ingested a cyanide pill minutes after a guilty verdict was read in his arson trial in Phoenix, Arizona; he died shortly thereafter.
- On 22 June 2015, John B. McLemore, a horologist and the central figure of the podcast S-Town, died after ingesting cyanide.
- On 29 November 2017, Slobodan Praljak died from drinking potassium cyanide, after being convicted of war crimes by the International Criminal Tribunal for the former Yugoslavia.
- Ramon Sampedro, a Spanish tetraplegic and activist whose assisted suicide in 1998 provoked a national debate about euthanasia. He was the subject of the Oscar-winning film The Sea Inside.

=== Mining and industrial ===
- In 1993, an illegal spill resulted in the death of seven people in Avellaneda, Argentina. In their memory, the National Environmental Conscious Day (Día Nacional de la Conciencia Ambiental) was established.
- In 2000, a spill at Baia Mare, Romania, resulted in the worst environmental disaster in Europe since Chernobyl.
- In 2000, Allen Elias, CEO of Evergreen Resources was convicted of knowing endangerment for his role in the cyanide poisoning of employee Scott Dominguez. This was one of the first successful criminal prosecutions of a corporate executive by the Environmental Protection Agency.

=== Murder ===
- John Tawell, a murderer who in 1845 became the first person to be arrested as the result of telecommunications technology.
- Grigori Rasputin (1916; attempted, later killed by gunshot)
- The Goebbels children (1945)
- Stepan Bandera (1959)
- Jonestown, Guyana, was the site of a large mass murder–suicide, in which over 900 members of the Peoples Temple drank potassium cyanide–laced Flavor Aid in 1978.
- Chicago Tylenol murders (1982)
- Timothy Marc O'Bryan (1966–1974) died on October 31, 1974, by ingesting potassium cyanide placed into a giant Pixy Stix. His father, Ronald Clark O'Bryan, was convicted of his murder, plus four counts of attempted murder. O'Bryan put potassium cyanide into five giant Pixy Stix that he gave to his son and daughter along with three other children. Only Timothy ate the poisoned candy and died.
- Bruce Nickell and Sue Snow (5 June 1986) were murdered by Stella Nickell who poisoned bottles of Excedrin.
- Richard Kuklinski (1935–2006)
- Janet Overton (1942–1988). Her husband, Richard Overton, was convicted of poisoning her, but Janet's symptoms did not match those of classic cyanide poisoning, the timeline was inconsistent with cyanide poisoning, and the amount found was just a trace. The diagnostic method used was prone to false positives. Richard Overton died in prison in 2009.
- Urooj Khan (1966–2012), won the lottery and was found dead a few days later. A blood diagnostic reported a lethal level of cyanide in his blood, but the body did not display any classic symptoms of cyanide poisoning, and no link to cyanide could be found in Urooj's social circle. The diagnostic method used was the Conway diffusion method, prone to false positives with artifacts of heart attack and kidney failure. The chemistry of this and other false positives could be linked to the TBARS response following heart failure.
- Autumn Marie Klein (20 April 2013), a prominent 41 year old neuroscientist and physician, died from cyanide poisoning. Klein's husband, Robert J. Ferrante, also a prominent neuroscientist who used cyanide in his research, was convicted of murder and sentenced to life in prison for her death. Robert Ferrante is appealing his conviction, claiming the cyanide was a false positive.
- Mirna Salihin died in hospital on 6 January 2016, after drinking a Vietnamese iced coffee at a cafe in a shopping mall in Jakarta. Police reports claim that cyanide poisoning was the most likely cause of her death.
- Jolly Thomas of Kozhikode, Kerala, India was arrested in 2019 for the murder of 6 family members. Murders took place over a 14-year period, and each victim ate a meal prepared by the killer. The murders were allegedly motivated by wanting control of the family finances and property.
- Mei Xiang Li of Brooklyn, New York, collapsed and died in April 2017, with cyanide later reported to be in her blood. However, Li never exhibited symptoms of cyanide poisoning and no link to cyanide could be found in her life.
- Sararath "Am" Rangsiwutthiporn, who became quickly known as "Am Cyanide" in Thai media, was arrested by the Thai police for allegedly poisoning 11 of her friends and acquaintances, spanning 2020 to 2023, with 10 deaths and 1 surviving supposed victim. According to an ongoing investigation, the number of victims is currently at 20-30 persons, mostly dead with several survived.

=== Warfare or terrorism ===
- In 1988, between 3,200 and 5,000 people died in the Halabja massacre owing to unknown chemical nerve agents. Hydrogen cyanide gas was strongly suspected.
- In 1995, a device was discovered in a restroom in the Kayabachō Tokyo subway station, consisting of bags of sodium cyanide and sulfuric acid with a remote controlled motor to rupture them, in what was believed to be an attempt by the Aum Shinrikyo cult to produce toxic amounts of hydrogen cyanide gas.
- In 2003, Al Qaeda reportedly planned to release cyanide gas into the New York City Subway system. The attack was supposedly aborted because there would not be enough casualties.

== Research ==
Cobinamide is the final compound in the biosynthesis of cobalamin. It has greater affinity for the cyanide than cobalamin itself, which suggests that it could be a better option for emergency treatment.

== See also ==
- Amygdalin
- Anaerobic glycolysis
- Lactic acidosis
- List of poisonings
- Konzo
- Murburn concept
