= Am Cyanide case =

Thai serial murder case

Sararat Rangsiwuthaporn
- Born: March 12, 1987 (age 39)
- Conviction: Murder (3 counts)
- Penalty: Death

Details
- Victims: 3 convicted, 14 total suspected
- Span of crimes: 2015 (suspected) – 2023
- Country: Thailand

The Am Cyanide case covers fourteen suspected serial murders by cyanide poisoning in Thailand from 2015 and 2023. It is so-called by the media after the nickname of the accused, Sararat Rangsiwuthaporn (Thai: สรารัตน์ รังสิวุฒาภรณ์), and her modus operandi.

== Investigation ==
The poisonings began in 2015, but the case gained public attention in April 2023 following the death of Siriporn Khanwong, a friend of Sararat's. Sararat and Siriporn had gone to a river in Ratchaburi province to take part in a Buddhist protection ritual together, after which Siriporn fainted and died on the riverbank. Following this, Sararat was arrested on 20 April and was denied bail. In the aftermath, families of previous victims, almost all of whom had personal connections to Sararat but whose deaths had been ruled to be of natural causes, came forward with their suspicions.

The investigation linked Sararat to fourteen suspected murders and one non-fatal poisoning. Police said the victims were friends and acquaintances from whom she had borrowed or stolen money, or whose possessions she intended to take. She was alleged to have used cyanide to poison her victims between 2015 and 2023, and investigators stated that she appeared to be motivated by an online gambling addiction. Authorities estimated that she had obtained more than THB 5,000,000 (€130,000) from the victims before poisoning them.

== Victims ==
Suspected murder victims
Name	Age	Death	Location	Verdict
Siriporn "Koy" Khanwong	32	14 April 2023	Ratchaburi	death
Policewoman Major Nipa "Inspector Poo" Saenchan		1 April 2023	Nakhon Pathom	Life
Sutthisak "Dae" Phoonkhwan (ex-boyfriend)	35			
Rosjarin "Jae Noi Phak" Nilhoi		10 August 2022	Samut Sakhon	
Surat Toraphap		2021	Kanchanaburi	
Kanika Tuaecharat		2021	Ratchaburi	
Chantharat Wongkraisin				Death
Policewoman Captain Kanda Torai				
Maneerat "Khu Tai" (Teacher Tai) Pojanat				
Nittaya Kaewbuppa				
Pusadee "Khru Ood" Samboonmee				
Sutthisak "Dae" Phoonkhwan				
Darinee "Fa" Thepthawee		December 2020	Nakhon Pathom	
Sawittree "Nim" Budsrirak	41	2020	Mukdahan	
Monthathip "Sai" Khao-in	37	2016	Thong Lor area of Bangkok	Dismiss
Kantima Paesa-ard		attempted murder	Kanchanaburi	Trial Date Scheduled on November 25, 2026

== Trials ==
The police forwarded over 80 charges against Sararat to the public prosecutor on 30 June. They included premeditated murder, attempted murder, theft causing death, and forgery. The case was instituted on 18 July 2023, and Sararat's ex-husband, Police Lieutenant Colonel Withoon Rangsiwuthaporn, and her lawyer Thanicha Aeksuwannawat were also accused of helping Sararat conceal evidence. The trial's first taking-of-evidence session took place on 4 July 2024.

In November 2024, Sararat was found guilty of murdering Siriporn Khanwong in the first of 14 trials, and sentenced to death. Meanwhile, her husband was sentenced to 16 months in prison for hiding evidence and helping Sararat evade arrest.

In February 2026, Sararat sentenced to life imprisonment for the April 2023 murder of Police Major Nipa Saenchan.

== See also ==
- List of serial killers by number of victims
- 2024 Bangkok hotel cyanide poisoning
