= Michael Marin =

American lawyer (1958-2012)

- Born: Michael James Marin; December 2, 1958
- Died: June 28, 2012 (aged 53); Phoenix, Arizona, U.S.
- Cause of death: Suicide by cyanide ingestion
- Education: Brigham Young University (B.A.), Yale University (J.D.)
- Children: 4

Michael James Marin (December 2, 1958 – June 28, 2012) was an American financier, lawyer, ex-Wall Street trader, and millionaire who died by suicide by cyanide ingestion minutes after being convicted of arson.

== Early life ==
Marin was raised in Oak Harbor, Washington. A member of The Church of Jesus Christ of Latter-day Saints, he attended Brigham Young University. After college, he enrolled at Yale Law School.

== Career ==
Marin advised on complex investments in the 1980s and 1990s, working for Lehman Brothers, Merrill Lynch, and Salomon Brothers mainly in their operations in Asia.

Marin led a lavish lifestyle, buying a multimillion-dollar mansion in Arizona and collecting works of art that included etchings by Pablo Picasso. He traveled extensively throughout Asia. He would travel to exotic climates and summited the highest peaks of six continents, including Mount Everest in 2001.

== Death ==
Marin was tried for arson and insurance fraud for setting his home on fire. Court hearings started on May 21, 2012, and Marin faced 7 to 21 years in prison if convicted.

The jury found Marin guilty on June 28, 2012. Soon after the verdict, and being informed that he was to be taken into custody immediately, he died by suicide in court. He was seen in court videos closing his eyes and putting his hands over his face as the verdict was being read, before putting something in his mouth and drinking a liquid. He then fell to the floor and began to convulse. Marin was rushed to a central hospital in Phoenix and was pronounced dead; an autopsy confirmed he had taken a lethal dose of cyanide. At the time of his death, he was a father of four and a grandfather of two.
