= 4-Dimethylaminophenol =

Names
- Preferred IUPAC name 4-(Dimethylamino)phenol

Identifiers
CAS Number	619-60-3
3D model (JSmol)	Interactive image
ChemSpider	20816
ECHA InfoCard	100.009.642
PubChem CID	22174
UNII	X387L5559O
CompTox Dashboard (EPA)	DTXSID70210932
- InChI: InChI=1S/C8H11NO/c1-9(2)7-3-5-8(10)6-4-7/h3-6,10H,1-2H3 Key: JVVRCYWZTJLJSG-UHFFFAOYSA-N; InChI=1/C8H11NO/c1-9(2)7-3-5-8(10)6-4-7/h3-6,10H,1-2H3 Key: JVVRCYWZTJLJSG-UHFFFAOYAU
- SMILES: Oc1ccc(N(C)C)cc1

Properties
Chemical formula	C_{8}H_{11}NO
Molar mass	137.179 g/mol
Boiling point	165 °C (329 °F; 438 K) (0.040 bar)

Pharmacology
ATC code	V03AB27 (WHO)
- Except where otherwise noted, data are given for materials in their standard state (at 25 °C [77 °F], 100 kPa). verify (what is ?) Infobox references

4-Dimethylaminophenol (DMAP) is an aromatic compound containing both phenol and amine functional groups. It has the molecular formula C_{8}H_{11}NO.

== Synthesis ==
Heating dimethylaniline N-oxide in concentrated sulfuric acid causes a Bamberger rearrangement to 2- and 4-dimethylaminophenols.

== Uses ==
4-Dimethylaminophenol has been used as an antidote for cyanide poisoning. It has also been shown to be effective in treating hydrogen sulfide toxicity.

It works by generating methemoglobin.

This is suitable as an emergency treatment only; treatment must be followed up with sodium thiosulfate or cobalamin.

In an animal model, it has shown effectiveness when given intramuscularly. Though, intramuscular injection should be avoid due to the probability of muscular necrosis after injection. Intravenous injection is recommended in a dose of 250 mg.

== See also ==
- Metol
