= Umbrella cell =

Specialised epithelial cells found in the urinary system

Umbrella cells (also known as facet cells, capping cells, and superficial urotheliocytes) are a type of cells located in the bladder, the renal pelvis, the ureters, and the urethra. Umbrella cells form the outermost layer of the urothelium of these organs. Umbrella cells are special in that they can contain multiple nuclei. Their apical membrane contains numerous invaginations, which allows the cells to stretch during urination. Umbrella cells are linked together with tight junctions which:

- prevents urine from leaking through the epithelium.
- creates an osmotic barrier: urine osmotic concentration can range from 50 to 1200 mmol/L while the normal concentration is 290 mmol/L. The difference between the two could lead to fluid entering or exiting the ureter due to the osmotic pressure.

Umbrella cells contain the proteins uroplakin-1a uroplakin-1b, uroplakin-2, and uroplakin-3a. These increase the strength of the urothelium.
