= Papillary urothelial neoplasm of low malignant potential =

PUNLMP (Papillary Urothelial Neoplasm of Low Malignant Potential)
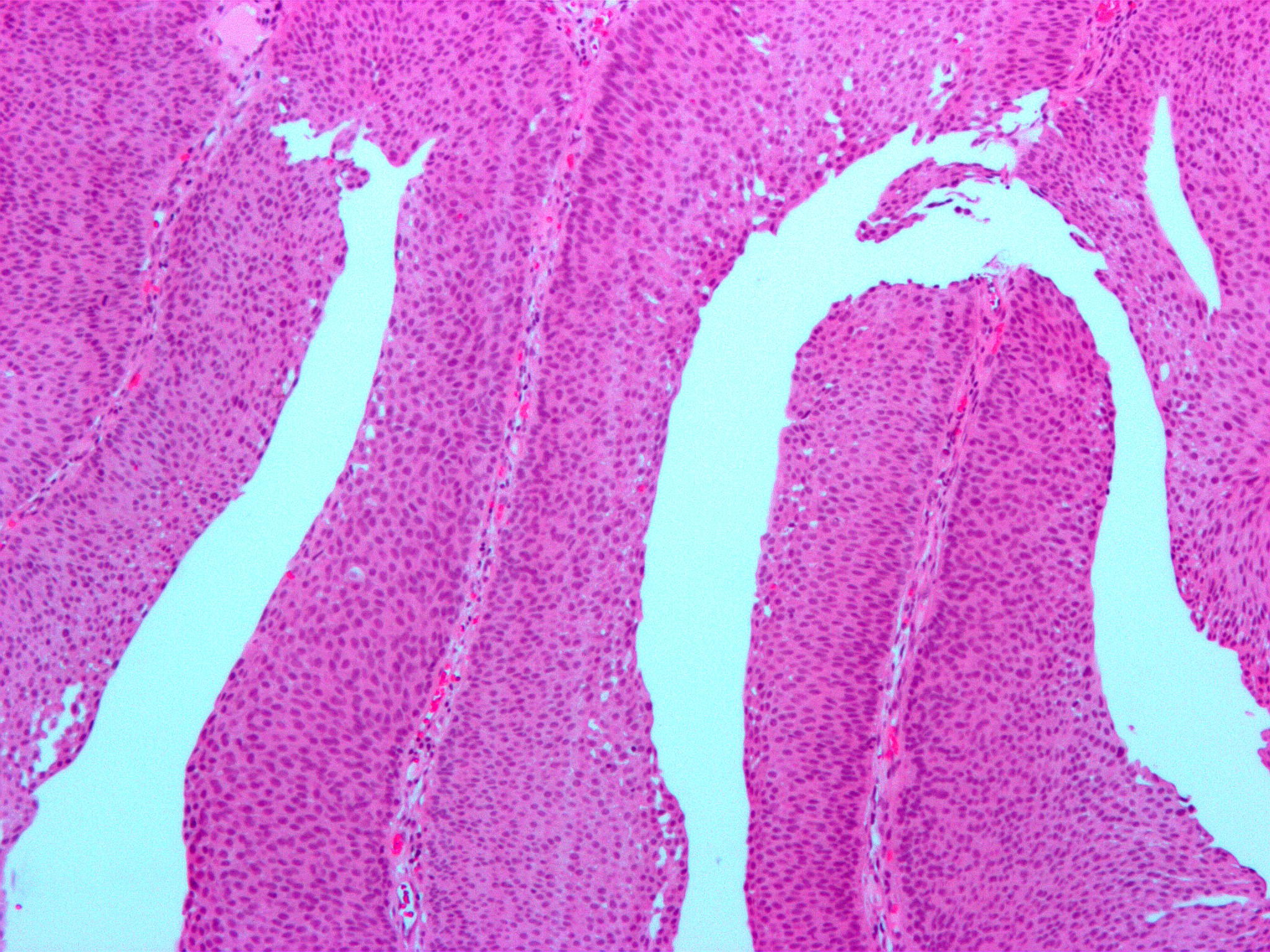
- Micrograph of a PUNLMP. Intermediate magnification. H&E stain.
- Specialty: Urology, pathology

Papillary urothelial neoplasm of low malignant potential (PUNLMP) is an exophytic (outward growing), (microscopically) nipple-shaped (or papillary) pre-malignant growth of the lining of the upper genitourinary tract (the urothelium), which includes the renal pelvis, ureters, urinary bladder and part of the urethra.

PUNLMP is pronounced pun-lump, like the words pun and lump.

As their name suggests, PUNLMPs are neoplasms, i.e. clonal cellular proliferations, that are thought to have a low probability of developing into urothelial cancer, i.e. a malignancy such as bladder cancer.

== Signs and symptoms ==
PUNLMPs can lead to blood in the urine (hematuria) or may be asymptomatic.

== Diagnosis ==
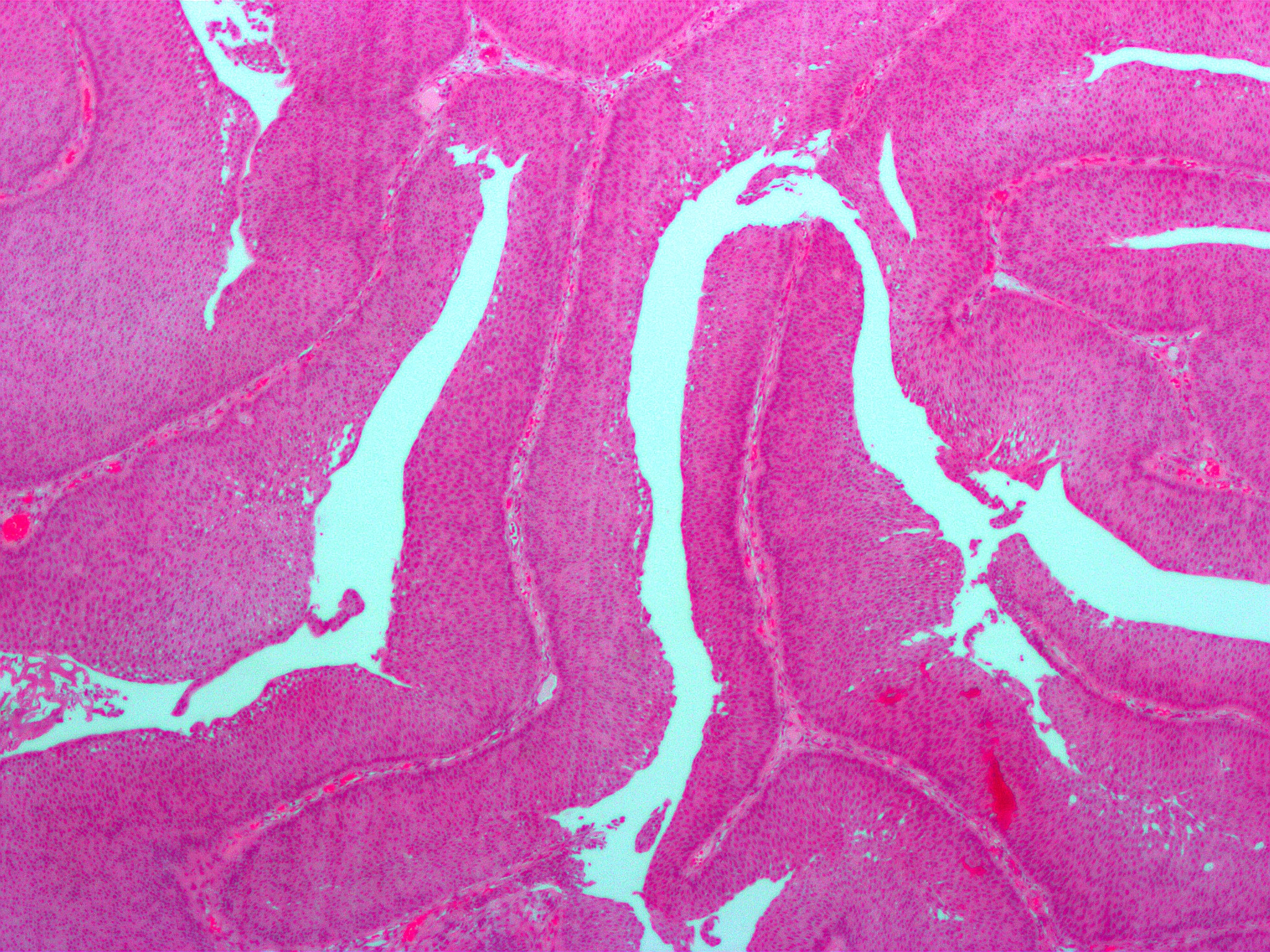
Micrograph of a PUNLMP showing characteristic features (see text). H&E stain.

PUNLMPs are exophytic lesions that appear friable to the naked eye and when imaged during cystoscopy. They are definitively diagnosed after removal by microscopic examination by pathologists.

Histologically, they have a papillary architecture with slender fibro vascular cores and rare basal mitoses. The papillae rarely fuse and uncommonly branch. Cytologically, they have uniform nuclear enlargement.

They cannot be reliably differentiated from low grade papillary urothelial carcinomas using cytology, and their diagnosis (vis-a-vis low grade papillary urothelial carcinoma) has a poor inter-rater reliability.

Pathologic grading and staging tumors are: graded by the degree of cellular atypia (G1->G3), and staged:

- papilloma
- papillary tumor of low malignant potential (PTLMP)
- papillary urothelial carcinomas low grade
- papillary urothelial carcinomas high grade.

=== Differential diagnosis ===
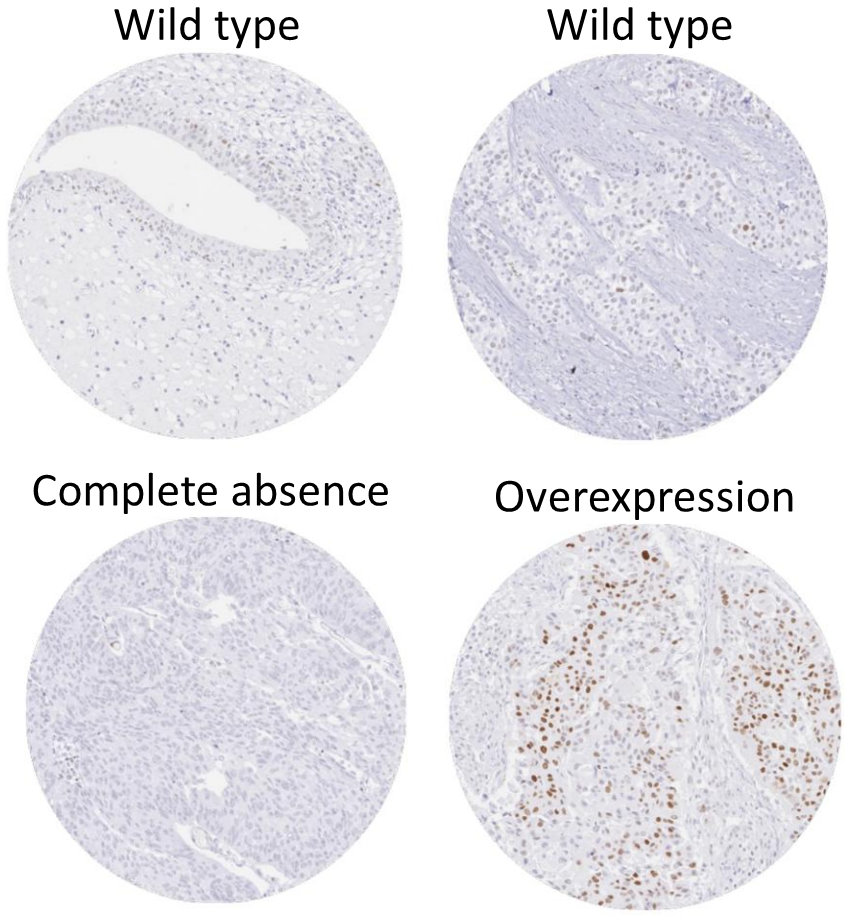
Immunohistochemistry for p53 can help distinguish a PUNLMP from a low grade urothelial carcinoma. Overexpression is seen in 75% of low-grade urothelial carcinomas and only 10% of PUNLMP.

- Papilloma.
- Low grade papillary urothelial carcinoma.

== Treatment ==
PUNLMPs are treated like non-invasive low grade papillary urothelial carcinomas, excision and regular follow-up cystoscopies.

There is a rare occurrence of a pelvic recurrence of a low-grade superficial TCC after cystectomy. Delayed presentation with recurrent low-grade urothelial carcinoma is an unusual entity and potential mechanism of traumatic implantation should be considered. Characteristically low-grade tumors are resistant to systemic chemotherapy and curative-intent surgical resection of the tumor should be considered.
