= Dicobalt edetate =

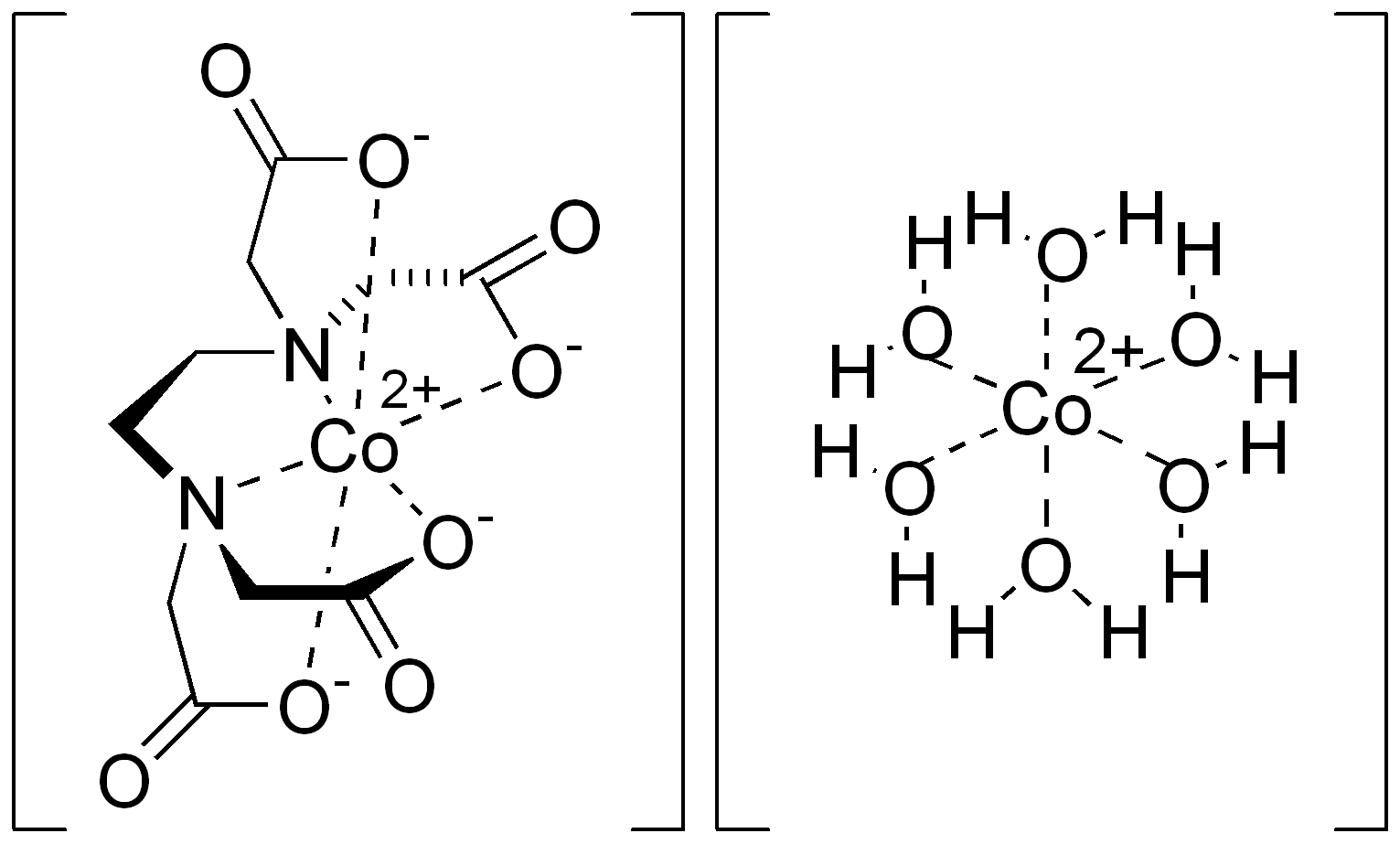

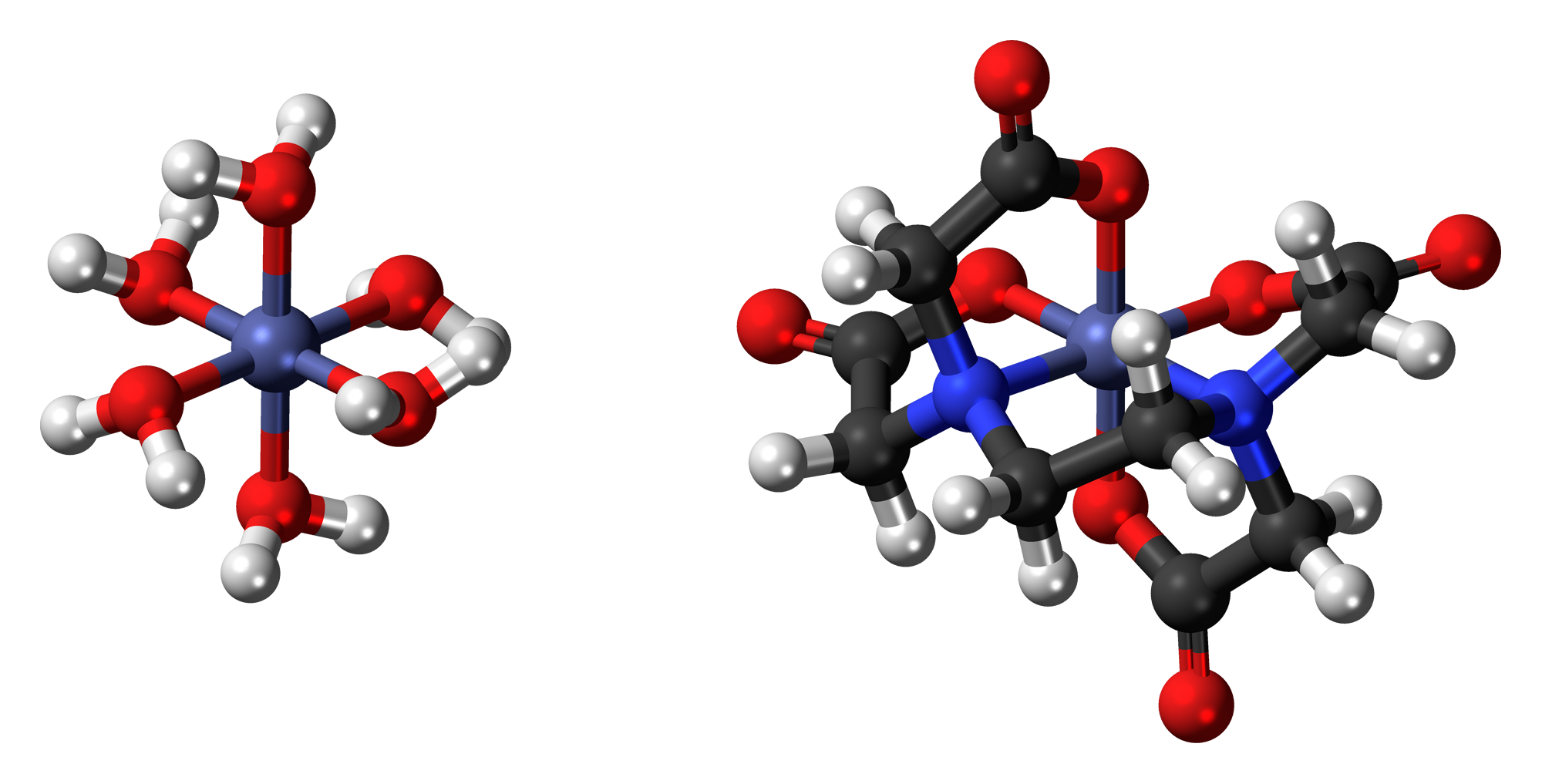

Names
- Other names Kelocyanor

Identifiers
CAS Number	36499-65-7
3D model (JSmol)	Interactive image; Interactive image
ChemSpider	64951
ECHA InfoCard	100.048.227
PubChem CID	71942
UNII	UKC6GH80QR
CompTox Dashboard (EPA)	DTXSID70189997
- InChI: InChI=1S/C10H16N2O8.2Co/c13-7(14)3-11(4-8(15)16)1-2-12(5-9(17)18)6-10(19)20;;/h1-6H2,(H,13,14)(H,15,16)(H,17,18)(H,19,20);;/q;2*+2/p-4 Key: TWAWHTJKASJPEK-UHFFFAOYSA-J; InChI=1/C10H16N2O8.2Co/c13-7(14)3-11(4-8(15)16)1-2-12(5-9(17)18)6-10(19)20;;/h1-6H2,(H,13,14)(H,15,16)(H,17,18)(H,19,20);;/q;2*+2/p-4 Key: TWAWHTJKASJPEK-XBHQNQODAQ
- SMILES: C(CN(CC(=O)[O-])CC(=O)[O-])N(CC(=O)[O-])CC(=O)[O-].[Co+2].[Co+2]; [Co+2].[Co+2].[O-]C(=O)CN(CC([O-])=O)CCN(CC([O-])=O)CC([O-])=O

Properties
Chemical formula	C_{10}H_{12}Co_{2}N_{2}O_{8}.6H_{2}O
Molar mass	406.08 g/mol 514.18 g/mol (hexahydrate)
- Except where otherwise noted, data are given for materials in their standard state (at 25 °C [77 °F], 100 kPa). verify (what is ?) Infobox references

Dicobalt edetate is the coordination compound with the approximate formula Co_{2}(EDTA)(H_{2}O)_{6}. It is a derivative of the (non-natural) amino acid ethylenediaminetetraacetate.

Solutions of this solid have been used in Europe as an antidote to cyanide poisoning, with the trade name Kelocyanor. However, dicobalt edetate is itself toxic, particularly if there is not enough cyanide in the blood to react with it, so it is only suitable for serious cases of poisoning. In the past, workplaces in the UK that handle cyanide were recommended to keep a 'Kelocyanor kit', to be taken to the hospital along with the patient, but this practice has been discontinued since it may mislead doctors into using the antidote unnecessarily.

== Structure ==
The compound is polymeric in the crystalline form. Half of the Co^{2+} ions are bound to the EDTA^{2−} and the other Co^{2+} ions are bound to four water ligands as well as carboxylate ligands on the [Co(EDTA)]^{2−} entity. In aqueous solution, depolymerization occurs to give [Co(EDTA)]^{2−} and [Co(H_{2}O)_{6}]^{2+} ions, each of which is kinetically labile and has a high affinity for cyanide.

== Related compounds ==
Oxidation of [Co(II)(EDTA)]^{2−} gives [Co(III)(EDTA)]^{−}, which is so kinetically inert that it can be resolved optically.
