= 3-Mercaptopyruvic acid =

Names
- Preferred IUPAC name 2-Oxo-3-sulfanylpropanoic acid
- Other names 3-Mercapto-2-oxopropanoic acid 3-MPV; 3-MP

Identifiers
CAS Number	2464-23-5
3D model (JSmol)	Interactive image; Interactive image
ChEBI	CHEBI:16208
ChemSpider	96
IUPHAR/BPS	5118
KEGG	C00957
MeSH	3-mercaptopyruvic+acid
PubChem CID	98
UNII	5Z1F5OW4YB
CompTox Dashboard (EPA)	DTXSID20862960 DTXSID30947575, DTXSID20862960
- InChI: InChI=1S/C3H4O3S/c4-2(1-7)3(5)6/h7H,1H2,(H,5,6) Key: OJOLFAIGOXZBCI-UHFFFAOYSA-N; InChI=1/C3H4O3S/c4-2(1-7)3(5)6/h7H,1H2,(H,5,6) Key: OJOLFAIGOXZBCI-UHFFFAOYAZ
- SMILES: C(C(=O)C(=O)O)S; O=C(O)C(=O)CS

Properties
Chemical formula	C_{3}H_{4}O_{3}S
Molar mass	120.12 g·mol^{−1}
- Except where otherwise noted, data are given for materials in their standard state (at 25 °C [77 °F], 100 kPa). verify (what is ?) Infobox references

3-Mercaptopyruvic acid is an intermediate in cysteine metabolism. It has been studied as a potential treatment for cyanide poisoning, but its half-life is too short for it to be clinically effective. Instead, prodrugs, such as sulfanegen, are being evaluated to compensate for the short half-life of 3-mercaptopyruvic acid.

== See also ==
- 3-mercaptopyruvate sulfurtransferase
