= Hydrogen sulfide =

Poisonous and flammable gas

- Skeletal formula of hydrogen sulfide with two dimensions

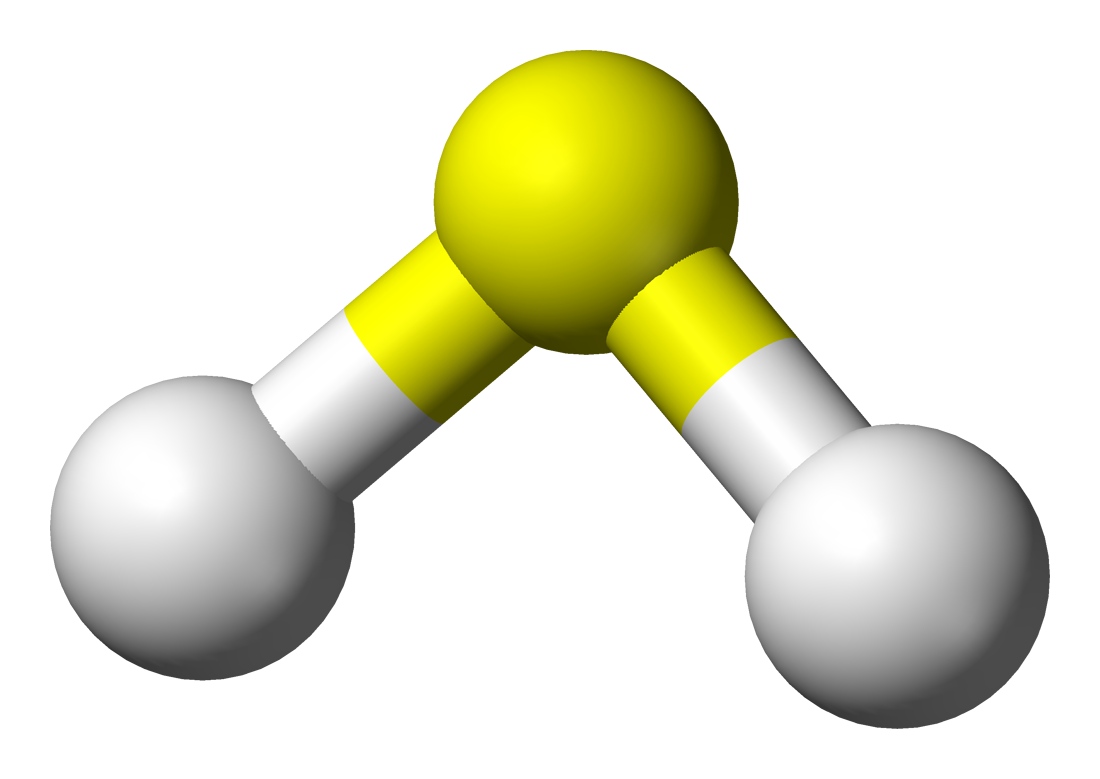
Ball-and-stick model of hydrogen sulfide
Spacefill model of hydrogen sulfide
Sulfur, S
Hydrogen, H

Names
- Systematic IUPAC name Hydrogen sulfide
- Other names: Dihydrogen monosulfide; Sour gas; Dihydrogen sulfide; Sewer gas; Egg gas; Sulfane; Sulfurated hydrogen; Sulfureted hydrogen; Sulfuretted hydrogen; Sulfur hydride; Hydrosulfuric acid; Hydrothionic acid; Thiohydroxic acid; Sulfhydric acid

Identifiers
CAS Number	7783-06-4
3D model (JSmol)	Interactive image
Beilstein Reference	3535004
ChEBI	CHEBI:16136
ChEMBL	ChEMBL1200739
ChemSpider	391
ECHA InfoCard	100.029.070
EC Number	231-977-3
Gmelin Reference	303
KEGG	C00283
MeSH	Hydrogen+sulfide
PubChem CID	402
RTECS number	MX1225000
UNII	YY9FVM7NSN
UN number	1053
CompTox Dashboard (EPA)	DTXSID4024149
- InChI: InChI=1S/H2S/h1H2 Key: RWSOTUBLDIXVET-UHFFFAOYSA-N; InChI=1/H2S/h1H2 Key: RWSOTUBLDIXVET-UHFFFAOYAJ
- SMILES: S

Properties
Chemical formula	H_{2}S
Molar mass	34.08 g·mol^{−1}
Appearance	Colorless gas
Odor	Foul, pungent, like that of rotten eggs
Density	1.539 g·L^{−1} (0 °C)
Melting point	−85.5 °C (−121.9 °F; 187.7 K)
Boiling point	−59.55 °C (−75.19 °F; 213.60 K)
Solubility in water	3980 mg/L (at 20 °C)
Vapor pressure	1740 kPa (at 21 °C)
Acidity (pK_{a})	7.0
Conjugate acid	Sulfonium
Conjugate base	Bisulfide
Magnetic susceptibility (χ)	−25.5·10^{−6} cm^{3}/mol
Refractive index (n_{D})	1.000644 (0 °C)

Structure
Point group	C_{2v}
Molecular shape	Bent
Dipole moment	0.97 D

Thermochemistry
Heat capacity (C)	1.003 J K^{−1} g^{−1}
Std molar entropy (S^{⦵}_{298})	206 J mol^{−1} K^{−1}
Std enthalpy of formation (Δ_{f}H^{⦵}_{298})	−21 kJ mol^{−1}

Hazards
- Occupational safety and health (OHS/OSH)
Main hazards	Flammable and highly toxic
- GHS labelling
Pictograms	(GHS02: Flammable) (GHS06: Toxic) (GHS09: Environmental hazard)
Signal word	Danger
Hazard statements	H220, H330, H400
Precautionary statements	P210, P260, P271, P273, P284, P304+P340, P310, P320, P377, P381, P391, P403, P403+P233, P405, P501
NFPA 704 (fire diamond)	4 4 0
Flash point	−82.4 °C (−116.3 °F; 190.8 K)
Autoignition temperature	232 °C (450 °F; 505 K)
Explosive limits	4.3–46%
- Lethal dose or concentration (LD, LC)
LC_{50} (median concentration)	713 ppm (rat, 1 hr); 673 ppm (mouse, 1 hr); 634 ppm (mouse, 1 hr); 444 ppm (rat, 4 hr)
LC_{Lo} (lowest published)	600 ppm (human, 30 min); 800 ppm (human, 5 min)
- NIOSH (US health exposure limits)
PEL (Permissible)	C 20 ppm; 50 ppm [10-minute maximum peak]
REL (Recommended)	C 10 ppm (15 mg/m^{3}) [10-minute]
IDLH (Immediate danger)	100 ppm

Related compounds
Related hydrogen chalcogenides	Water; Hydrogen selenide; Hydrogen telluride; Hydrogen polonide; Hydrogen disulfide; Sulfanyl
Related compounds	Phosphine
- Except where otherwise noted, data are given for materials in their standard state (at 25 °C [77 °F], 100 kPa). verify (what is ?) Infobox references

Hydrogen sulfide (preferred IUPAC name and American English) or hydrogen sulphide (Commonwealth English) is a chemical compound with the formula H_{2}S. It is a colorless, toxic, and flammable hydrogen chalcogenide gas. Trace amounts in the ambient atmosphere have a characteristic foul odor of rotten eggs. Swedish chemist Carl Wilhelm Scheele is credited with having discovered the chemical composition of purified hydrogen sulfide in 1777.

Hydrogen sulfide is toxic to humans and most other animals by inhibiting cellular respiration in a manner similar to hydrogen cyanide. When it is inhaled or its salts are ingested in high amounts, damage to organs occurs rapidly, with symptoms ranging from breathing difficulties to convulsions and death. Despite this, the human body produces small amounts of this sulfide and its mineral salts, and uses it as a gaseous signaling molecule.

Hydrogen sulfide is often produced from the microbial breakdown of organic matter in the absence of oxygen, such as in swamps and sewers; this process is commonly known as anaerobic digestion, carried out by sulfate-reducing microorganisms. It also occurs in volcanic gases, natural gas deposits, and sometimes in well-drawn water.

== Properties ==
Hydrogen sulfide is slightly denser than air. A mixture of H_{2}S and air can be explosive.

=== Oxidation ===
In general, hydrogen sulfide acts as a reducing agent, as indicated by its ability to reduce sulfur dioxide in the Claus process. Hydrogen sulfide burns in oxygen with a blue flame to form sulfur dioxide (SO_{2}) and water:

2 H_{2}S + 3 O_{2} → 2 SO_{2} + 2 H_{2}O

If an excess of oxygen is present, sulfur trioxide (SO_{3}) is formed, which quickly hydrates to sulfuric acid:

SO_{3} + H_{2}O → H_{2}SO_{4}

=== Acid-base properties ===
It is slightly soluble in water and acts as a weak acid (pK_{a} = 6.9 in 0.01–0.1 mol/litre solutions at 18 °C), giving the hydrosulfide ion HS^{−}. Hydrogen sulfide and its solutions are colorless. When exposed to air, it slowly oxidizes to form elemental sulfur, which is not soluble in water. The sulfide anion S^{2−} is not formed in aqueous solution.

H_{2}S and H_{2}O exchange protons rapidly. This behavior is the basis of the Girdler sulfide process which is used in the purification of deuterium oxide ("heavy water" or D_{2}O) and exploits the easy distillation of these compounds.

=== Extreme temperatures and pressures ===
At pressures above 90 GPa (gigapascal – 900,000 atmospheres), hydrogen sulfide becomes a metallic conductor of electricity. When cooled below a critical temperature this high-pressure phase exhibits superconductivity. The critical temperature increases with pressure, ranging from 23 K at 100 GPa to 150 K at 200 GPa. If hydrogen sulfide is pressurized at higher temperatures, then cooled, the critical temperature reaches 203 K (−70 °C), which was the highest accepted superconducting critical temperature until the discovery of lanthanum decahydride in 2019. By substituting a small part of sulfur with phosphorus and using even higher pressures, it has been predicted that it may be possible to raise the critical temperature to above 0 °C (273 K) and achieve room-temperature superconductivity.

Under atmospheric pressure and in the absence of a catalyst, hydrogen sulfide decomposes around 1200 °C into hydrogen and sulfur.

=== Reactions with metals ===
Hydrogen sulfide reacts with metal ions to form metal sulfides, which are insoluble, often dark colored solids. This behavior is the basis of the use of hydrogen sulfide as a reagent in the qualitative inorganic analysis of metal ions. In these analyses, heavy metal (and nonmetal) ions (e.g., Pb(II), Cu(II), Hg(II), As(III)) are precipitated from solution upon exposure to H_{2}S. The components of the resulting solid are then identified by their reactivity. Lead(II) acetate paper is used to detect hydrogen sulfide because it readily converts to lead(II) sulfide, which is black.

Hydrogen sulfide is also responsible for tarnishing on various metals including copper and silver; the chemical responsible for black toning found on silver coins is silver sulfide (Ag_{2}S), which is produced when the silver on the surface of the coin reacts with atmospheric hydrogen sulfide. Coins that have been subject to toning by hydrogen sulfide and other sulfur-containing compounds may have the toning add to the numismatic value of a coin based on aesthetics, as the toning may produce thin-film interference, resulting in the coin taking on an attractive coloration. Coins can also be intentionally treated with hydrogen sulfide to induce toning, though artificial toning can be distinguished from natural toning, and is generally criticised among collectors.

== Production ==
Hydrogen sulfide is most commonly obtained by its separation from sour gas, which is natural gas with a high content of H_{2}S. It can also be produced by treating hydrogen with molten elemental sulfur at about 450 °C. Hydrocarbons can serve as a source of hydrogen in this process.

S + H_{2} → H_{2}S

The very favorable thermodynamics for the hydrogenation of sulfur implies that the dehydrogenation (or cracking) of hydrogen sulfide would require very high temperatures.

A standard lab preparation is to treat ferrous sulfide with a strong acid in a Kipp generator:

FeS + 2 HCl → FeCl_{2} + H_{2}S

For use in qualitative inorganic analysis, thioacetamide is used to generate H_{2}S:

CH_{3}C(S)NH_{2} + H_{2}O → CH_{3}C(O)NH_{2} + H_{2}S

Many metal and nonmetal sulfides, e.g. aluminium sulfide, phosphorus pentasulfide, silicon disulfide liberate hydrogen sulfide upon exposure to water:

6 H_{2}O + Al_{2}S_{3} → 3 H_{2}S + 2 Al(OH)_{3}

This gas is also produced by heating sulfur with solid organic compounds and by reducing sulfurated organic compounds with hydrogen. It can also be produced by mixing ammonium thiocyanate to concentrated sulfuric acid and adding water to it.

=== Biosynthesis ===
Hydrogen sulfide can be generated in cells via enzymatic or non-enzymatic pathways. Three enzymes catalyze formation of H_{2}S: cystathionine γ-lyase (CSE), cystathionine β-synthetase (CBS), and 3-mercaptopyruvate sulfurtransferase (3-MST). CBS and CSE are the main proponents of H_{2}S biogenesis, which follows the trans-sulfuration pathway. These enzymes have been identified in a breadth of biological cells and tissues, and their activity is induced by a number of disease states. These enzymes are characterized by the transfer of a sulfur atom from methionine to serine to form a cysteine molecule. 3-MST also contributes to hydrogen sulfide production by way of the cysteine catabolic pathway. Dietary amino acids, such as methionine and cysteine serve as the primary substrates for the transulfuration pathways and in the production of hydrogen sulfide. Hydrogen sulfide can also be derived from proteins such as ferredoxins and Rieske proteins.

Sulfate-reducing (resp. sulfur-reducing) bacteria generate usable energy under low-oxygen conditions by using sulfates (resp. elemental sulfur) to oxidize organic compounds or hydrogen; this produces hydrogen sulfide as a waste product.

=== Signaling role ===
H_{2}S in the body acts as a gaseous signaling molecule with implications for health and in diseases. H_{2}S is involved in vasodilation in animals, as well as in increasing seed germination and stress responses in plants. Hydrogen sulfide exists in biology at nanomolar concentrations; much of its cell signaling function can be attributed to the formation of hydropersulfides from biological thiols.

H_{2}S can directly modulate mammalian physiology in three ways: by reacting with reactive oxygen species (ROS) and reactive nitrogen species (RNS), by binding or reduction of metal centers of iron-heme proteins, and by persulfidation of protein cysteine residues. Through persulfidation of Keap1, hydrogen sulfide acts to reduce or disrupt ROS levels in cells via activation of Nrf2, which is known to increase the levels of glutathione. H_{2}S has been shown to interact with the NO pathway resulting in several different cellular effects, including the inhibition of cGMP phosphodiesterases, as well as the formation of nitroxyl and thionitrous acid (HSNO), an inorganic S-nitrosothiol capable of nitrosating protein cysteine residues.

The field of H_{2}S biology has advanced from environmental toxicology to investigate the roles of endogenously produced H_{2}S in physiological conditions and in various pathophysiological states. H_{2}S has been implicated in cancer, Down syndrome, and in vascular disease.

At lower concentrations, it stimulates mitochondrial function via multiple mechanisms including direct electron donation. However, at higher concentrations, it inhibits Complex IV of the mitochondrial electron transport chain, which effectively reduces ATP generation and biochemical activity within cells.

== Uses ==
=== Production of sulfur ===
Hydrogen sulfide is mainly consumed as a precursor to elemental sulfur. This conversion, called the Claus process, involves partial oxidation to sulfur dioxide. The latter reacts with hydrogen sulfide to give elemental sulfur. The conversion is catalyzed by alumina.

2 H_{2}S + SO_{2} → 3 S + 2 H_{2}O

=== Production of thioorganic compounds ===
Many fundamental organosulfur compounds are produced using hydrogen sulfide. These include methanethiol, ethanethiol, and thioglycolic acid. Hydrosulfides can be used in the production of thiophenol.

=== Production of metal sulfides ===
Upon combining with alkali metal bases, hydrogen sulfide converts to alkali hydrosulfides such as sodium hydrosulfide and sodium sulfide:

H_{2}S + NaOH → NaSH + H_{2}O
NaSH + NaOH → Na_{2}S + H_{2}O

Sodium sulfides are used in the paper making industry. Specifically, salts of HS^{−} break bonds between lignin and cellulose components of pulp in the Kraft process.

As indicated above, many metal ions react with hydrogen sulfide to give the corresponding metal sulfides. Oxidic ores are sometimes treated with hydrogen sulfide to give the corresponding metal sulfides, which are more readily purified by flotation. Metal parts are sometimes passivated with hydrogen sulfide. Catalysts used in hydrodesulfurization are routinely activated with hydrogen sulfide.

=== Occurrence ===
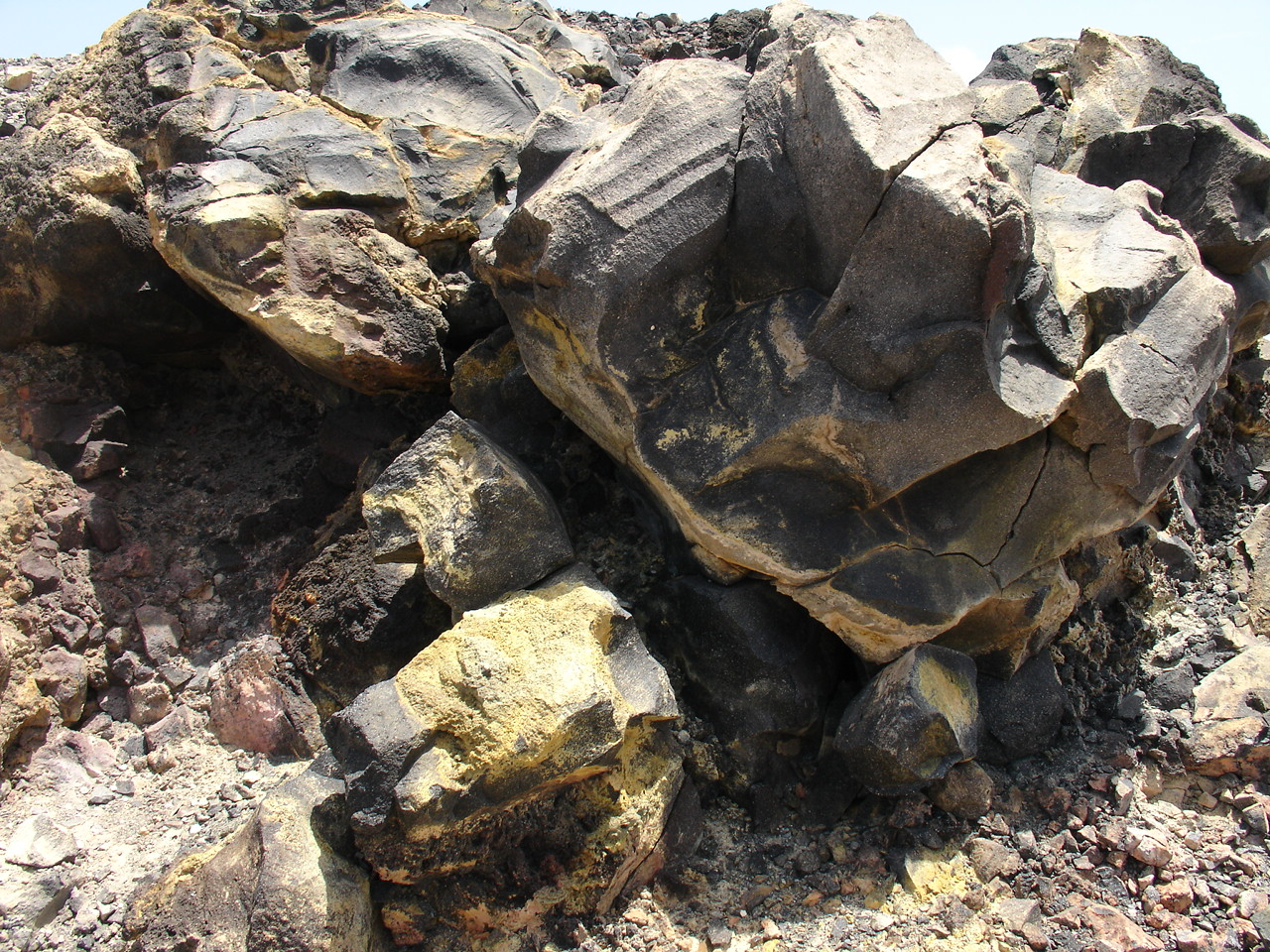
Deposit of sulfur on a rock, caused by volcanic gas

Volcanoes and some hot springs (as well as cold springs) emit some H_{2}S. Hydrogen sulfide can be present naturally in well water, often as a result of the action of sulfate-reducing bacteria. Hydrogen sulfide is produced by the human body in small quantities through bacterial breakdown of proteins containing sulfur in the intestinal tract; it therefore contributes to the characteristic odor of flatulence. It is also produced in the mouth (halitosis).

A portion of global H_{2}S emissions is due to human activity. By far the largest industrial source of H_{2}S is petroleum refineries: The hydrodesulfurization process liberates sulfur from petroleum by the action of hydrogen. The resulting H_{2}S is converted to elemental sulfur by partial combustion via the Claus process, which is a major source of elemental sulfur. Other anthropogenic sources of hydrogen sulfide include coke ovens, paper mills (using the Kraft process), tanneries and sewerage. H_{2}S arises from virtually anywhere where elemental sulfur comes in contact with organic material, especially at high temperatures. Depending on environmental conditions, it is responsible for the deterioration of material through the action of some sulfur-oxidizing microorganisms. It is called biogenic sulfide corrosion.

In 2011, it was reported that increased concentrations of H_{2}S were observed in the Bakken formation crude, possibly due to oil field practices, and presented challenges such as "health and environmental risks, corrosion of wellbore, added expense with regard to materials handling and pipeline equipment, and additional refinement requirements".

Besides living near gas and oil drilling operations, ordinary citizens can be exposed to hydrogen sulfide by being near sewage treatment facilities, landfills and farms with manure storage. Exposure occurs through breathing contaminated air or drinking contaminated water. Decomposing sargasso algae as it occurs in coastal areas of countries affected by the Great Atlantic Sargassum Belt emit hydrogen sulfide.

In municipal waste landfill sites, the burial of organic matter rapidly leads to the production of anaerobic digestion within the waste mass and, with the humid atmosphere and relatively high temperature that accompanies biodegradation, biogas is produced as soon as the air within the waste mass has been reduced. If there is a source of sulfate-bearing material, such as plasterboard or natural gypsum (calcium sulfate dihydrate), under anaerobic conditions sulfate reducing bacteria convert this to hydrogen sulfide. These bacteria cannot survive in air, but the moist, warm, anaerobic conditions of buried, high-carbon waste provide an excellent environment for the formation of hydrogen sulfide. In inert landfills, paper and glue used in the fabrication of products such as plasterboard can provide a rich source of carbon.

In industrial anaerobic digestion processes, such as wastewater treatment or the digestion of organic waste from agriculture, hydrogen sulfide can be formed from the reduction of sulfate and the degradation of amino acids and proteins within organic compounds. Sulfates are relatively non-inhibitory to methane forming bacteria but can be reduced to H_{2}S by sulfate reducing bacteria, of which there are several genera.

=== Removal from water ===
A number of processes have been designed to remove hydrogen sulfide from drinking water.

Continuous chlorination
For levels up to 75 mg/L chlorine is used in the purification process as an oxidizing chemical to react with hydrogen sulfide. This reaction yields insoluble solid sulfur. Usually, the chlorine used is in the form of sodium hypochlorite.

Aeration
For concentrations of hydrogen sulfide lower than 2 mg/L aeration is an ideal treatment process. Atmospheric oxygen is injected into water (air sparging), and oxidizes hydrogen sulfide, producing odorless sulfate.

=== Removal from fuel gases ===
Hydrogen sulfide is commonly found in raw natural gas and biogas. It is typically removed by amine gas treating technologies. In such processes, the hydrogen sulfide is first converted to an ammonium salt, whereas the natural gas is unaffected.

RNH_{2} + H_{2}S ⇌ [RNH_{3}]^{+} + SH^{−}

The bisulfide anion is subsequently regenerated by heating of the amine sulfide solution. Hydrogen sulfide generated in this process is typically converted to elemental sulfur using the Claus process.

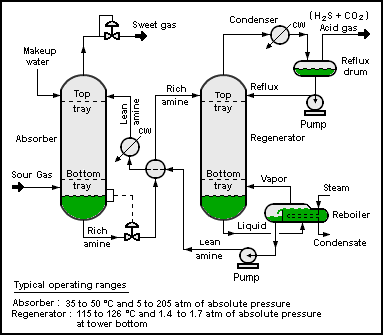
Process flow diagram of a typical amine treating process used in petroleum refineries, natural gas processing plants and other industrial facilities

== Safety ==
The underground mine gas term for foul-smelling hydrogen sulfide-rich gas mixtures is stinkdamp. Hydrogen sulfide is a highly toxic and flammable gas (flammable range: 4.3–46%). It can poison several systems in the body, although the nervous system is most affected. The toxicity of H_{2}S is comparable with that of carbon monoxide. It binds with iron in the mitochondrial cytochrome enzymes, thus preventing cellular respiration. Its toxic properties were described in detail in 1843 by Justus von Liebig.

Even before hydrogen sulfide was discovered, Italian physician Bernardino Ramazzini hypothesized in his 1713 book De Morbis Artificum Diatriba that occupational diseases of sewer-workers and blackening of coins in their clothes may be caused by an unknown invisible volatile acid (moreover, in late 18th century toxic gas emanation from Paris sewers became a problem for the citizens and authorities).

Although very pungent at first (it smells like rotten eggs), it quickly deadens the sense of smell, creating temporary anosmia, so victims may be unaware of its presence until it is too late. Safe handling procedures are provided by its safety data sheet (SDS).

=== Low-level exposure ===
Since hydrogen sulfide occurs naturally in the body, the environment, and the gut, enzymes exist to metabolize it. At some threshold level, believed to average around 300–350 ppm, the oxidative enzymes become overwhelmed. Many personal safety gas detectors, such as those used by utility, sewage and petrochemical workers, are set to alarm at as low as 5 to 10 ppm and to go into high alarm at 15 ppm. Metabolism causes oxidation to sulfate, which is harmless. Hence, low levels of hydrogen sulfide may be tolerated indefinitely.

Exposure to lower concentrations can result in eye irritation, a sore throat and cough, nausea, shortness of breath, and fluid in the lungs. These effects are believed to be due to hydrogen sulfide combining with alkali present in moist surface tissues to form sodium sulfide, a caustic. These symptoms usually subside in a few weeks if exposure is discontinued.

Long-term, low-level exposure may result in fatigue, loss of appetite, headaches, irritability, poor memory, and dizziness. Chronic exposure to low level H_{2}S (around 2 ppm) has been implicated in increased miscarriage and reproductive health issues among Russian and Finnish wood pulp workers. An increase in pre-eclampsia has been reported in women impacted by sargassum strandings in Martinique.

=== High-level exposure ===
Short-term, high-level exposure can induce immediate collapse, with loss of breathing and a high probability of death. If death does not occur, high exposure to hydrogen sulfide can lead to cortical pseudolaminar necrosis, degeneration of the basal ganglia and cerebral edema. Although respiratory paralysis may be immediate, it can also be delayed up to 72 hours.

Inhalation of H_{2}S resulted in about 7 workplace deaths per year in the U.S. (2011–2017 data), second only to carbon monoxide (17 deaths per year) for workplace chemical inhalation deaths.

==== Exposure thresholds ====
- Exposure limits stipulated by the United States government:
  - 10 ppm REL-Ceiling (NIOSH): recommended permissible exposure ceiling (the recommended level that must not be exceeded, except once for 10 min. in an 8-hour shift, if no other measurable exposure occurs)
  - 20 ppm PEL-Ceiling (OSHA): permissible exposure ceiling (the level that must not be exceeded, except once for 10 min. in an 8-hour shift, if no other measurable exposure occurs)
  - 50 ppm PEL-Peak (OSHA): peak permissible exposure (the level that must never be exceeded)
  - 100 ppm IDLH (NIOSH): immediately dangerous to life and health (the level that interferes with the ability to escape)
- 0.00047 ppm or 0.47 ppb is the odor threshold for hydrogen sulfide, the point at which 50% of a human panel can detect the presence of an odor without being able to identify it.
- 0.0047 ppm or 4.7 ppb is the recognition threshold, the point at which 50% of a human panel can identify the presence of hydrogen sulfide.
- 10–20 ppm is the borderline concentration for eye irritation.
- 50–100 ppm leads to eye damage.
- At 100–150 ppm the olfactory nerve is paralyzed after a few inhalations, and the sense of smell disappears, often together with awareness of danger.
- 320–530 ppm leads to pulmonary edema with the possibility of death.
- 530–1000 ppm causes strong stimulation of the central nervous system and rapid breathing, leading to loss of breathing.
- 800 ppm is the lethal concentration for 50% of humans for 5 minutes' exposure (LC50).
- Concentrations over 1000 ppm cause immediate collapse with loss of breathing, even after inhalation of a single breath.

==== Treatment ====
Treatment involves immediate inhalation of amyl nitrite, injections of sodium nitrite, or administration of 4-dimethylaminophenol in combination with inhalation of pure oxygen, administration of bronchodilators to overcome eventual bronchospasm, and in some cases hyperbaric oxygen therapy (HBOT). HBOT has clinical and anecdotal support.

=== Notable accidents ===
Hydrogen sulfide was used by the British Army as a chemical weapon during World War I. It was not considered an ideal war gas, partly because of its flammability and because its distinctive smell could be detected even from a small leak, alerting the enemy to its presence. It was nevertheless used on two occasions in 1916 when other gases were in short supply.

On September 2, 2005, a sewage line leak in the propeller room of a Royal Caribbean Cruise Liner docked in Los Angeles resulted in the deaths of 3 crewmen. As a result, all such compartments are now required to have a ventilation system.

A dump of toxic waste containing hydrogen sulfide is believed to have caused 17 deaths and thousands of illnesses in Abidjan, on the West African coast, in the 2006 Ivory Coast toxic waste dump.

In September 2008, three workers were killed, and two suffered serious injury, including long-term brain damage, at a mushroom growing company in Langley, British Columbia. A valve to a pipe that carried chicken manure, straw and gypsum to the compost fuel for the mushroom growing operation became clogged, and as workers unclogged the valve in a confined space without proper ventilation the hydrogen sulfide that had built up due to anaerobic decomposition of the material was released, poisoning the workers in the surrounding area. An investigator said there could have been more fatalities if the pipe had been fully cleared and/or if the wind had changed directions.

In 2014, levels of hydrogen sulfide as high as 83 ppm were detected at a recently built mall in Thailand called Siam Square One at the Siam Square area. Shop tenants at the mall reported health complications such as sinus inflammation, breathing difficulties and eye irritation. After investigation, it was determined that the large amount of gas originated from the imperfect treatment and disposal of wastewater in the building.

In 2014, hydrogen sulfide gas killed workers at the Promenade shopping center in North Scottsdale, Arizona, US, after climbing into 15 ft deep chamber without wearing personal protective gear. "Arriving crews recorded high levels of hydrogen cyanide and hydrogen sulfide coming out of the sewer."

In November 2014, a substantial amount of hydrogen sulfide gas shrouded the central, eastern and southeastern parts of Moscow. Residents in the area were urged by the emergency ministry to stay indoors. Altough the exact source of the gas was not known, blame had been placed on a Moscow oil refinery.

In June 2016, a mother and her daughter were found dead in their still-running 2006 Porsche Cayenne SUV against a guardrail on Florida's Turnpike, initially thought to be victims of carbon monoxide poisoning. Their deaths remained unexplained as the medical examiner waited for results of toxicology tests on the victims, until urine tests revealed that hydrogen sulfide was the cause of death. A report from the Orange-Osceola Medical Examiner's Office indicated that toxic fumes came from the Porsche's starter battery, located under the front passenger seat.

In January 2017, three utility workers in Key Largo, Florida died one by one within seconds of descending into a narrow space beneath a manhole cover to check a section of paved street. In an attempt to save the men, a firefighter who entered the hole without his air tank (because he could not fit through the hole with it) collapsed within seconds and had to be rescued by a colleague. The firefighter was airlifted to Jackson Memorial Hospital and later recovered. A Monroe County Sheriff officer initially determined that the space contained hydrogen sulfide and methane gas produced by decomposing vegetation.

On May 24, 2018, two workers were killed, another seriously injured, and 14 others hospitalized by hydrogen sulfide inhalation at a Norske Skog paper mill in Albury, New South Wales. An investigation by SafeWork NSW found that the gas was released from a tank used to hold process water. The workers were exposed at the end of a 3-day maintenance period. Hydrogen sulfide had accumulated in an upstream tank that had been left stagnant and untreated with a biocide during the maintenance period. These conditions allowed sulfate-reducing bacteria to grow in the upstream tank, as the water contained small quantities of wood pulp and fiber. The high rate of pumping from this tank into the tank involved in the incident caused hydrogen sulfide gas to escape from various openings around its top when pumping was resumed at the end of the maintenance period. The area above it was sufficiently enclosed for the gas to pool there, even though Norske Skog did not identify it as a confined space. One of the workers who was killed was exposed while investigating an apparent fluid leak in the tank, while the other, who was killed, and the worker who was badly injured were attempting to rescue the first after he collapsed on top of it. In a resulting criminal case, Norske Skog was accused of failing to ensure the health and safety of its workforce at the plant to a reasonably practicable extent. It pleaded guilty, and was fined AU$1,012,500 and ordered to fund the production of an anonymized educational video about the incident.

In October 2019, an Odessa, Texas employee of Aghorn Operating Inc. and his wife were killed due to a water pump failure. Produced water with a high concentration of hydrogen sulfide was released by the pump. The worker died while responding to an automated phone call he had received alerting him to a mechanical failure in the pump, while his wife died after driving to the facility to check on him. A CSB investigation cited lax safety practices at the facility, such as an informal lockout-tagout procedure and a nonfunctioning hydrogen sulfide alert system.

On April 22, 2026, a leak occurred in Institute, West Virginia. Two deaths resulted from the accident, along with 27 hospitalized.

=== Suicides ===
The gas, produced by mixing certain household ingredients, was used in a suicide wave in 2008 in Japan. The wave prompted staff at Tokyo's suicide prevention center to set up a special hotline during "Golden Week", as they received an increase in calls from people wanting to kill themselves during the annual May holiday.

As of 2010, this phenomenon has occurred in a number of US cities, prompting warnings to those arriving at the site of the suicide.

In 2020, H_{2}S ingestion was used as a suicide method by Japanese pro wrestler Hana Kimura.

In 2024, Lucy-Bleu Knight, stepdaughter of famed musician Slash, also used H_{2}S ingestion to commit suicide.

== In the natural environment ==
=== Microbial: The sulfur cycle ===
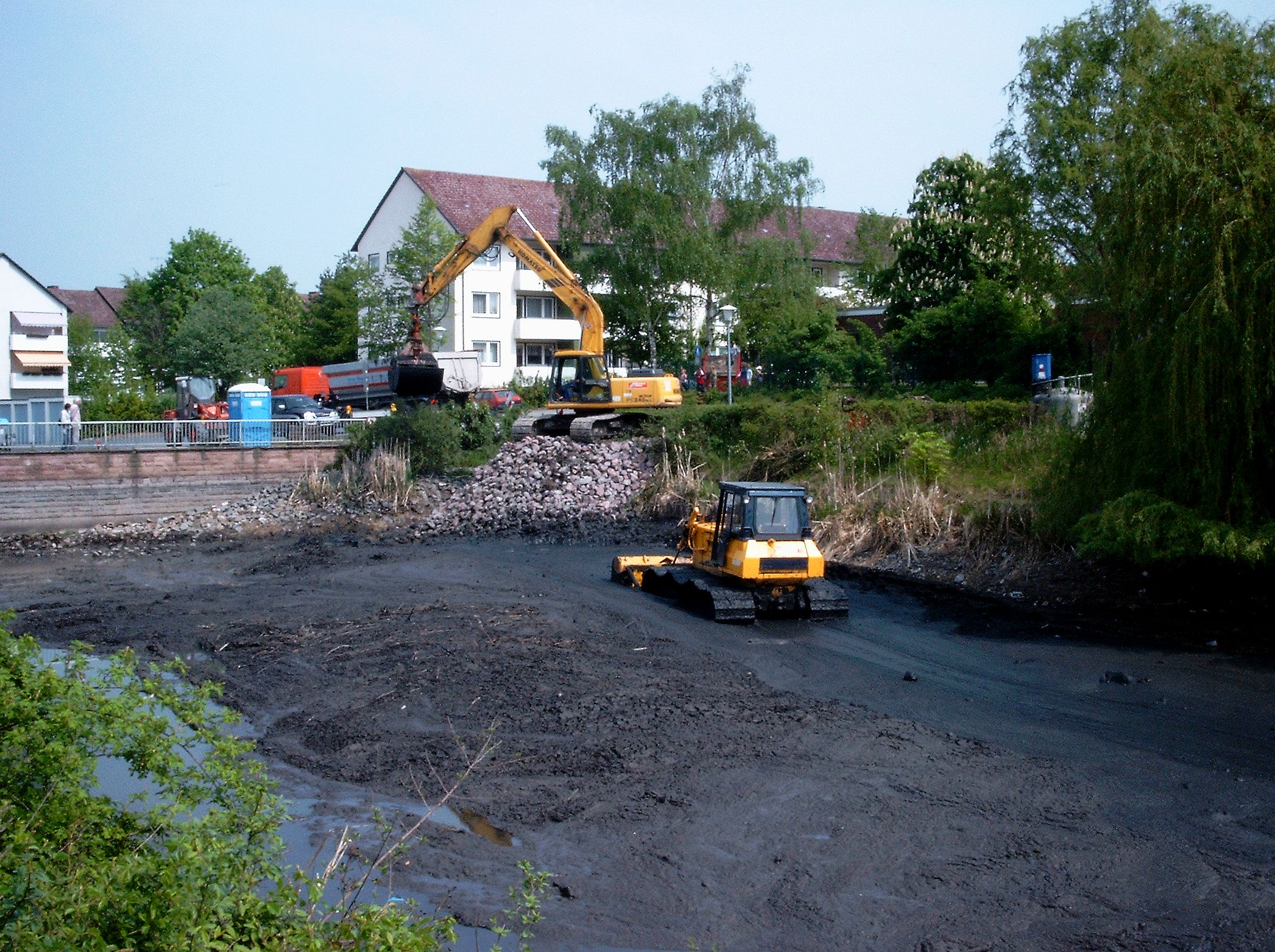
A drained pond, showing the layer of sludge on the bottom; its black colour is due to the presence of metal sulfides, the result of reactions with hydrogen sulfide produced by bacteria.

Hydrogen sulfide is a central participant in the sulfur cycle, the biogeochemical cycle of sulfur on Earth.

In the absence of oxygen, sulfur-reducing and sulfate-reducing bacteria derive energy from oxidizing hydrogen or organic molecules by reducing elemental sulfur or sulfate to hydrogen sulfide. Other bacteria liberate hydrogen sulfide from sulfur-containing amino acids; this gives rise to the odor of rotten eggs and contributes to the odor of flatulence.

As organic matter decays under low-oxygen (or hypoxic) conditions (such as in swamps, eutrophic lakes or dead zones of oceans), sulfate-reducing bacteria will use the sulfates present in the water to oxidize the organic matter, producing hydrogen sulfide as waste. Some of the hydrogen sulfide will react with metal ions in the water to produce metal sulfides, which are not water-soluble. These metal sulfides, such as ferrous sulfide FeS, are often black or brown, leading to the dark color of sludge.

Several groups of bacteria can use hydrogen sulfide as fuel, oxidizing it to elemental sulfur or to sulfate by using dissolved oxygen, metal oxides (e.g., iron oxyhydroxides and manganese oxides), or nitrate as electron acceptors.

The purple sulfur bacteria and the green sulfur bacteria use hydrogen sulfide as an electron donor in photosynthesis, thereby producing elemental sulfur. This mode of photosynthesis is older than the mode of cyanobacteria, algae, and plants, which uses water as electron donor and liberates oxygen.

The biochemistry of hydrogen sulfide is a key part of the chemistry of the iron-sulfur world. In this model of the origin of life on Earth, geologically produced hydrogen sulfide is postulated as an electron donor driving the reduction of carbon dioxide.

=== Animals ===
Hydrogen sulfide is lethal to most animals, but a few highly specialized species (extremophiles) do thrive in habitats that are rich in this compound.

In the deep sea, hydrothermal vents and cold seeps with high levels of hydrogen sulfide are home to a number of extremely specialized lifeforms, ranging from bacteria to fish, such as the Sulphur molly. Because of the absence of sunlight at these depths, these ecosystems rely on chemosynthesis rather than photosynthesis.

Freshwater springs rich in hydrogen sulfide are mainly home to invertebrates, but also include a small number of fish: Cyprinodon bobmilleri (a pupfish from Mexico), Limia sulphurophila (a poeciliid from the Dominican Republic), Gambusia eurystoma (a poeciliid from Mexico), and a few other poecilia. Invertebrates and microorganisms in some cave systems, such as Movile Cave, are adapted to high levels of hydrogen sulfide.

=== Interstellar and planetary occurrence ===
Hydrogen sulfide has often been detected in the interstellar medium. It also occurs in the clouds of planets in the Solar System.

=== Mass extinctions ===
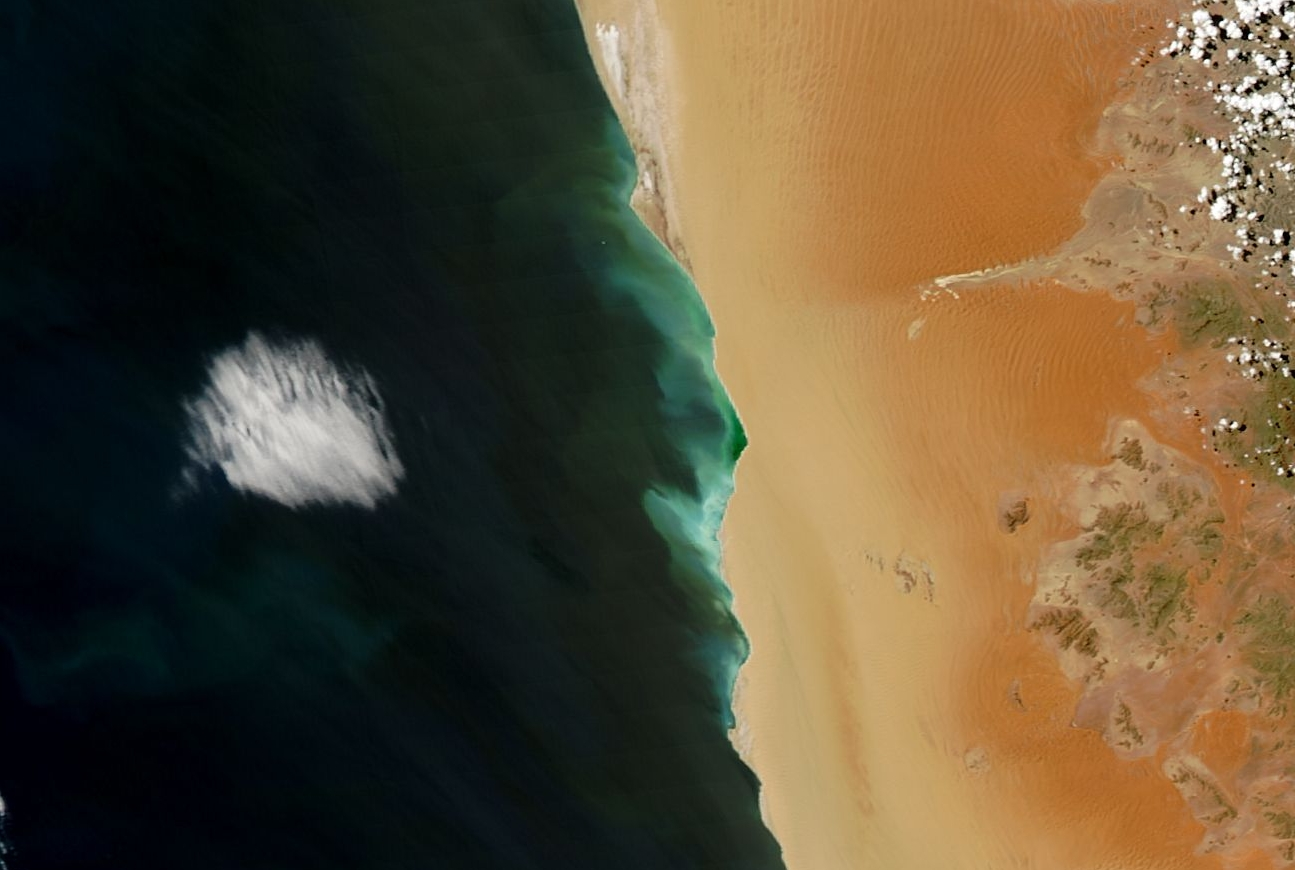
A hydrogen sulfide bloom (green) stretching for about 150 km (93 mi) along the coast of Namibia. As oxygen-poor water reaches the coast, bacteria in the organic-matter rich sediment produce hydrogen sulfide, which is toxic to fish.

Hydrogen sulfide has been implicated in several mass extinctions that have occurred in the Earth's past. In particular, a buildup of hydrogen sulfide in the atmosphere may have caused, or at least contributed to, the Permian–Triassic extinction event 252 million years ago.

Organic residues from these extinction boundaries indicate that the oceans were anoxic (oxygen-depleted) and had species of shallow plankton that metabolized H_{2}S. The formation of H_{2}S may have been initiated by massive volcanic eruptions, which emitted carbon dioxide and methane into the atmosphere, which warmed the oceans, lowering their capacity to absorb oxygen that would otherwise oxidize H_{2}S. The increased levels of hydrogen sulfide could have killed oxygen-generating plants as well as depleted the ozone layer, causing further stress. Small H_{2}S blooms have been detected in modern times in the Dead Sea and in the Atlantic Ocean off the coast of Namibia.

== See also ==
- Hydrogen chalcogenide – Chemical compound with hydrogen and chalcogen atoms
- Hydrogen sulfide chemosynthesis
- Marsh gas
- Sewer gas – Gases produced and collected in sewer systems
- Targeted temperature management, also known as induced hypothermia – Medical procedure

== Additional resources ==
- Committee on Medical and Biological Effects of Environmental Pollutants (1979). Hydrogen Sulfide. Baltimore: University Park Press. ISBN 978-0-8391-0127-7.
- Siefers, Andrea (2010). A novel and cost-effective hydrogen sulfide removal technology using tire derived rubber particles (MS thesis). Iowa State University.
