= Invasive urothelial carcinoma =

Invasive urethelia carcinoma
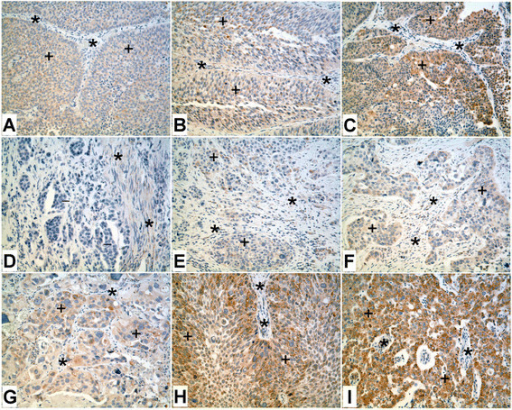
- Immunoperoxidase staining of ZIP8 in high grade urothelial carcinoma.A &B. Noninvasive urothelial carcinoma showing weak staining of ZIP8 (+). Asterisks (*) indicate stromal tissue which is negative for ZIP8. C. Noninvasive urothelial carcinoma with focal moderate staining of ZIP8 (+). Asterisks (*) indicate stromal tissue which is negative for ZIP8. D. Invasive urothelial carcinoma with negative staining of ZIP8 (−). Few smooth muscle fibers between the invasive tumor nests are weakly positive for ZIP8 (*). E. Invasive urothelial carcinoma with focal weak staining of ZIP8 (+). Asterisks (*) indicate stromal tissue which is negative for ZIP8. F. Invasive urothelial carcinoma with weak staining of ZIP8 (+). A few spindled shaped stromal cells are also weakly positive for ZIP8 (*). G. Anaplastic urothelial carcinoma showing moderate staining for ZIP8 (+). Asterisks (*) indicate stromal tissue which is negative for ZIP8. H. Invasive urothelial carcinoma with moderate to strong staining of ZIP8 (*). A few spindled shaped stromal cells are weakly positive for ZIP8 (*). I. Poorly differentiated urothelial carcinoma with strong staining for ZIP8 (+). Asterisks (*) indicate stromal tissue which is negative for ZIP8.
- Specialty: Oncology

Invasive urothelial carcinoma is a type of transitional cell carcinoma. It is a type of cancer that develops in the urinary system: the kidney, urinary bladder, and accessory organs. Transitional cell carcinoma is the most common type of bladder cancer and cancer of the ureter, urethra, renal pelvis, the ureters, the bladder, and parts of the urethra and urachus. It originates from tissue lining the inner surface of these hollow organs - transitional epithelium. The invading tumors can extend from the kidney collecting system to the bladder.

Carcinoma (from the Greek karkinos, or "crab", and -oma, "growth") is a type of cancer. A carcinoma is a cancer that begins in a tissue that lines the inner or outer surfaces of the body, and that generally arises from cells originating in the endodermal or ectodermal germ layer during embryogenesis.

== Symptoms ==
Symptoms vary between individuals and can be dependent upon the stage of growth of the carcinoma. Presence of the carcinoma can lead to be asymptomatic blood in the urine (hematuria), Hematuria can be visible or detected microscopically. Visible hematuria is when urine appears red or brown and can be seen with the naked eye. Other symptoms are not specific. Other inflammatory conditions that affect the bladder and kidney can create similar symptoms. Early detection facilitates curing the disease. Other symptoms can involve:

- pain or burning on urination
- the sensation of not being able to completely empty the bladder
- the sensation of needing to urinate more often or more frequently than normal

These symptoms are general and also indicate less serious problems.

== Prognosis and treatment ==
Prognosis is highly variable and dependent upon a multitude of factors. Reoccurrence does occur. Treatment is determined on a case-by-case basis.

== See also ==
Transitional epithelium
