= Transitional epithelium =

A type of tissue

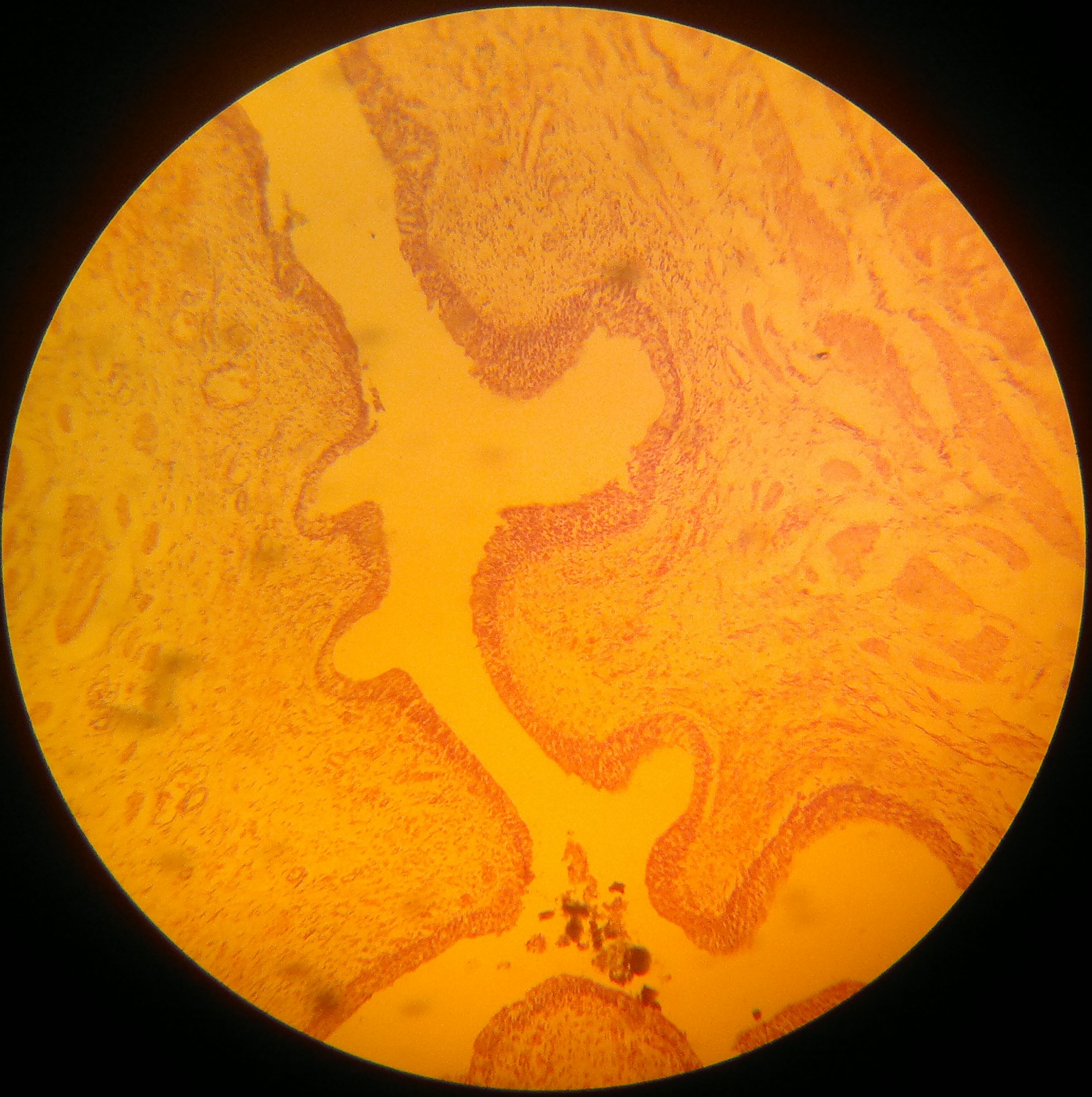
- Transitional epithelium

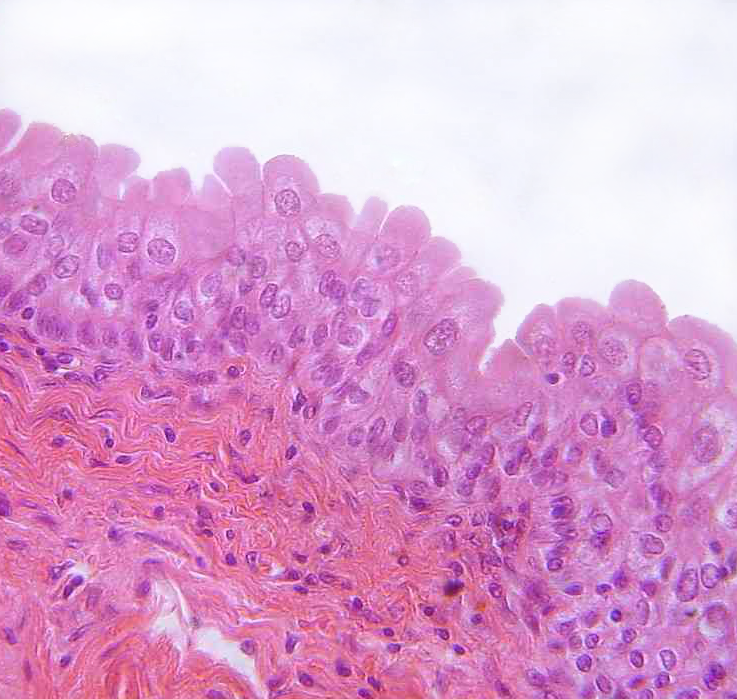
- Transitional epithelium of the bladder, known as urothelium. The rounded surface of the apical cells is a distinguishing characteristic of this type of epithelium.

Details
- System: Urinary system

Identifiers
- TH: H2.00.02.0.02033

Transitional epithelium animation, highlighting the epithelial layer, then underlying connective tissue. Contrast the messy appearance of the epithelial surface to other epithelial tissues.

Transitional epithelium, also known as urothelium is a type of stratified epithelium that changes shape in response to stretching. Transitional epithelium usually appears cuboidal when relaxed and squamous when stretched. This tissue consists of multiple layers of epithelial cells which can contract and expand in order to adapt to the degree of distension needed. Transitional epithelium lines all of the organs of the urinary system – the kidneys, ureters, bladder, and the urethra, hence its alternative name of urothelium. The bladder, for example, has a need for great distension.

== Structure ==
The appearance of transitional epithelium differs according to its cell layer. Cells of the basal layer are cuboidal (cube-shaped), or columnar (column-shaped), while the cells of the superficial layer vary in appearance depending on the degree of distension. These cells appear to be cuboidal with a domed apex when the organ or the tube in which they reside is not stretched. When the organ or tube is stretched (such as when the bladder is filled with urine), the tissue compresses and the cells become stretched. When this happens, the cells flatten, and they appear to be squamous and irregular.

=== Cell layers ===
Transitional epithelium is made up of three types of cell layers: basal, intermediate, and superficial. The basal layer fosters the epithelial stem cells in order to provide constant renewal of the epithelium, and each basal cell contacts the basement membrane. These cells' cytoplasm is rich in tonofilaments and mitochondria; however, they contain few rough endoplasmic reticulum. The tonofilaments play a role in the attachment of the basal layer to the basement membrane via desmosomes. The intermediate cell layer is highly proliferative and, therefore, provides for rapid cell regeneration in response to injury or infection of the organ or tube in which it resides. These cells contain a prominent Golgi apparatus and an array of membrane-bound vesicles. These function in the packaging and transport of proteins, such as keratin, to the superficial cell layer. The cells of the superficial cell layer that lines the lumen are known as facet cells or umbrella cells. This layer is the only fully differentiated layer of the epithelium. It provides an impenetrable barrier between the lumen and the bloodstream, so as not to allow the bloodstream to reabsorb harmful wastes or pathogens. All transitional epithelial cells are covered in microvilli and a fibrillar mucous coat.

The epithelium contains many intimate and delicate connections to neural and connective tissue. These connections allow for communication to tell the cells to expand or contract. The superficial layer of transitional epithelium is connected to the basal layer via cellular projections, such as intermediate filaments protruding from the cellular membrane. These structural elements cause the epithelium to allow distension; however, these also cause the tissue to be relatively fragile and, therefore, difficult to study.

=== Cell membrane ===
The urothelium is the most impermeable membrane in the mammalian body. Because of its importance in acting as an osmotic barrier between the contents of the urinary tract and the surrounding organs and tissues, transitional epithelium is relatively impermeable to water and salts. This impermeability is due to a highly keratinized cellular membrane synthesized in the Golgi apparatus. The membrane is made up of a hexagonal lattice put together in the Golgi apparatus and implanted into the surface of the cell by reverse pinocytosis, a type of exocytosis. The cells in the superficial layer of the transitional epithelium are highly differentiated, allowing for maintenance of this barrier membrane. The basal layer of the epithelium is much less differentiated; however, it does act as a replacement source for more superficial layer. While the Golgi complex is much less prominent in the cells of the basal layer, these cells are rich in cytoplasmic proteins that bundle together to form tonofibrils. These tonofibrils converge at hemidesmosomes to attach the cells at the basement membrane.

== Function ==
The transitional epithelium cells stretch readily in order to accommodate fluctuation of volume of the liquid in an organ (the distal part of the urethra becomes non-keratinized stratified squamous epithelium in females; the part that lines the bottom of the tissue is called the basement membrane). Transitional epithelium also functions as a barrier between the lumen, or inside hollow space of the tract that it lines and the bloodstream. To help achieve this, the cells of transitional epithelium are connected by tight junctions, or virtually impenetrable junctions that seal together to the cellular membranes of neighboring cells. This barrier prevents re-absorption of toxic wastes and pathogens by the bloodstream.

== Clinical significance ==
Urothelium is susceptible to carcinoma. Because the bladder is in contact with urine for extended periods, chemicals that become concentrated in the urine can cause bladder cancer. For example, cigarette smoking leads to the concentration of carcinogens in the urine and is a leading cause of bladder cancer. Aristolochic acid, a compound found in plants of the family Aristolochiaceae, also causes DNA mutations and is a cause of liver, urothelial and bladder cancers. Occupational exposure to certain chemicals is also a risk factor for bladder cancer. This can include aromatic amines (aniline dye), polycyclic aromatic hydrocarbons, and diesel engine exhaust.

=== Carcinoma ===
Carcinoma is a type of cancer that occurs in epithelial cells. Transitional cell carcinoma (urothelial carcinoma) is the leading type of bladder cancer, occurring in 9 out of 10 cases. It is also the leading cause of cancer of the ureter, urethra, and urachus, and the second leading cause of cancer of the kidney. Transitional cell carcinoma can develop in two different ways. Should the transitional cell carcinoma grow toward the inner surface of the bladder via finger-like projections, it is known as papillary carcinoma. Otherwise, it is known as flat carcinoma. Either form can transition from non-invasive to invasive by spreading into the muscle layers of the bladder. Transitional cell carcinoma is commonly multifocal, more than one tumor occurring at the time of diagnosis.

Transitional cell carcinoma can metastasize, or spread to other parts of the body via the surrounding tissues, the lymph system, and the bloodstream. It can spread to the tissues and fat surrounding the kidney, the fat surrounding the ureter, or, more progressively, lymph nodes and other organs, including bone. Common risk factors of transitional cell carcinoma include long-term misuse of pain medication, smoking, and exposure to chemicals used in the making of leather, plastic, textiles, and rubber.

Transitional cell carcinoma patients have a variety of treatment options. These include nephroureterectomy, or the removal of kidney, ureter, and bladder cuff, and segmental resection of the ureter. This is an option only when the cancer is superficial and infects only the bottom third of the ureter. The procedure entails removing the segment of cancerous ureter and reattaching the end. Patients with advanced bladder cancer or disease, also often look to bladder reconstruction as a treatment. Current methods of bladder reconstruction include the use of gastrointestinal tissue. However, while this method is effective in improving the function of the bladder, it can actually increases the risk of cancer, and can cause other complications, such as infections, urinary stones, and electrolyte imbalance. Therefore, other methods loom in the future. For example, current research paves the way for use of pluripotent stem cells to derive urothelium, as they are highly and indefinitely proliferative in vitro (i.e. outside of the body).

=== Interstitial cystitis ===
Interstitial cystitis (IC), a type of painful bladder syndrome, is a chronic disease of the bladder that causes feelings of pressure and pain in the bladder among other symptoms which can range from mild to severe. Urinary frequency and urgency are the most common symptoms associated with the disease. The exact causes of IC/BPS are unknown, but there is evidence of an association between increased permeability of the urothelium and IC. Since the purpose of the urothelium is to act as a highly resistant barrier, the loss of this function has serious clinical implications. Many patients with IC have exhibited a loss of umbrella cells.

=== Urothelial lesions ===
- Papillary urothelial lesions
  - Papillary urothelial hyperplasia
  - Urothelial papilloma
  - Papillary urothelial neoplasm of low malignant potential (PUNLMP)
  - Low-grade papillary urothelial carcinoma
  - High-grade papillary urothelial carcinoma
  - Invasive urothelial carcinoma
- Flat urothelial lesions
  - Reactive urothelial atypia
  - Urothelial inverted papilloma
  - Urothelial atypia of unknown significance
  - Urothelial dysplasia
  - Urothelial carcinoma in situ
- Invasive urothelial carcinoma
  - Invasive urothelial carcinoma (NOS)
  - Urothelial carcinoma with inverted growth pattern
  - Urothelial carcinoma with squamous differentiation
  - Urothelial carcinoma with villoglandular differentiation
  - Urothelial carcinoma, micropapillary variant
  - Urothelial carcinoma, lymphoepithelioma-like variant
  - Urothelial carcinoma, clear cell (glycogen-rich) variant
  - Urothelial carcinoma, lipoid cell variant
  - Urothelial carcinoma with syncitiotrophoblastic giant cells
  - Urothelial carcinoma with rhabdoid differentiation
  - Urothelial carcinoma similar to giant cell tumor of bone

== Gallery ==
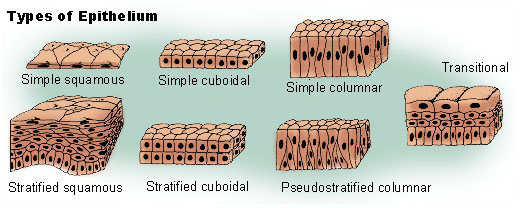
Types of epithelium

Schematic view of transitional epithelium

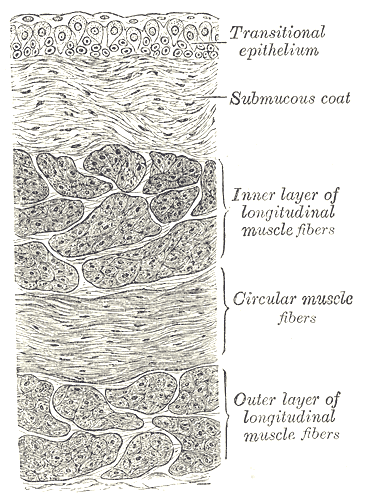
Vertical section of bladder wall.

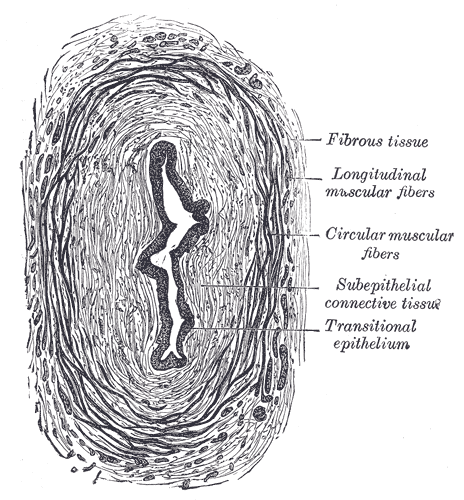
Transverse section of ureter.

== See also ==
- List of distinct cell types in the adult human body
- List of human cell types derived from the germ layers
