= Molecular lesion =

Damage to the structure of a biological molecule

Ball and Stick Model of Double Helical DNA

A molecular lesion or point lesion is damage to the structure of a biological molecule such as DNA, RNA, or protein. This damage may result in the reduction or absence of normal function, and in rare cases the gain of a new function. Lesions in DNA may consist of breaks or other changes in chemical structure of the helix, ultimately preventing transcription. Meanwhile, lesions in proteins consist of both broken bonds and improper folding of the amino acid chain. While many nucleic acid lesions are general across DNA and RNA, some are specific to one, such as thymine dimers being found exclusively in DNA. Several cellular repair mechanisms exist, ranging from global to specific, in order to prevent lasting damage resulting from lesions.

== Causes ==
There are two broad causes of nucleic acid lesions, endogenous and exogenous factors. Endogenous factors, or endogeny, refer to the resulting conditions that develop within an organism. This is in contrast to exogenous factors which originate from outside the organism. DNA and RNA lesions caused by endogenous factors generally occur more frequently than damage caused by exogenous ones.

=== Endogenous factors ===
Endogenous sources of specific DNA damage include pathways like hydrolysis, oxidation, alkylation, mismatch of DNA bases, depurination, depyrimidination, double-strand breaks (DSS), and cytosine deamination. DNA lesions can also naturally occur from the release of specific compounds such as reactive oxygen species (ROS), reactive nitrogen species (RNS), reactive carbonyl species (RCS), lipid peroxidation products, adducts, and alkylating agents through metabolic processes. ROS is one of the major endogenous sources of DNA damage and the most studied oxidative DNA adduct is 8-oxo-dG. Other adducts known to form are etheno-, propano-, and malondialdehyde-derived DNA adducts. The aldehydes formed from lipid peroxidation also pose another threat to DNA. Proteins such as "damage-up" proteins (DDPs) can promote endogenous DNA lesions by either increasing the amount of reactive oxygen by transmembrane transporters, losing chromosomes by replisome binding, and stalling replication by transcription factors. For RNA lesions specifically, the most abundant types of endogenous damage include oxidation, alkylation, and chlorination. Phagocytic cells produce radical species that include hypochlorous acid (HOCl), nitric oxide (NO•), and peroxynitrite (ONOO−) to fight infections, and many cell types use nitric oxide as a signaling molecule. However, these radical species can also cause the pathways that form RNA lesions.

Thymine Photodimer Caused by UV Light

=== Exogenous factors ===
==== Ultraviolet radiation ====
UV light, specifically non-ionizing shorter-wavelength radiation such as UVC and UVB, causes direct DNA damage by initiating a synthesis reaction between two thymine molecules. The resulting dimer is very stable. Although they can be removed through excision repairs, when UV damage is extensive, the entire DNA molecule breaks down and the cell dies. If the damage is not too extensive, precancerous or cancerous cells are created from healthy cells.

==== Chemotherapy ====
Chemotherapeutics, by design, induce DNA damage and are targeted towards rapidly dividing cancer cells. However, these drugs can not tell the difference between sick and healthy cells, resulting in the damage of normal cells. Alkylating agents are a type of chemotherapeutic drug which keeps the cell from undergoing mitosis by damaging its DNA. They work in all phases of the cell cycle. The use of alkylating agents may result in leukemia due to them being able to target the cells of the bone marrow.

==== Cancer causing agents ====
Carcinogens are known to cause a number of DNA lesions, such as single-strand breaks, double- strand breaks, and covalently bound chemical DNA adducts. Tobacco products are one of the most prevalent cancer-causing agents of today. Other DNA damaging, cancer-causing agents include asbestos, which can cause damage through physical interaction with DNA or by indirectly setting off a reactive oxygen species, excessive nickel exposure, which can repress the DNA damage-repair pathways, aflatoxins, which are found in food, and many more.

== Lesions of Nucleic Acids ==
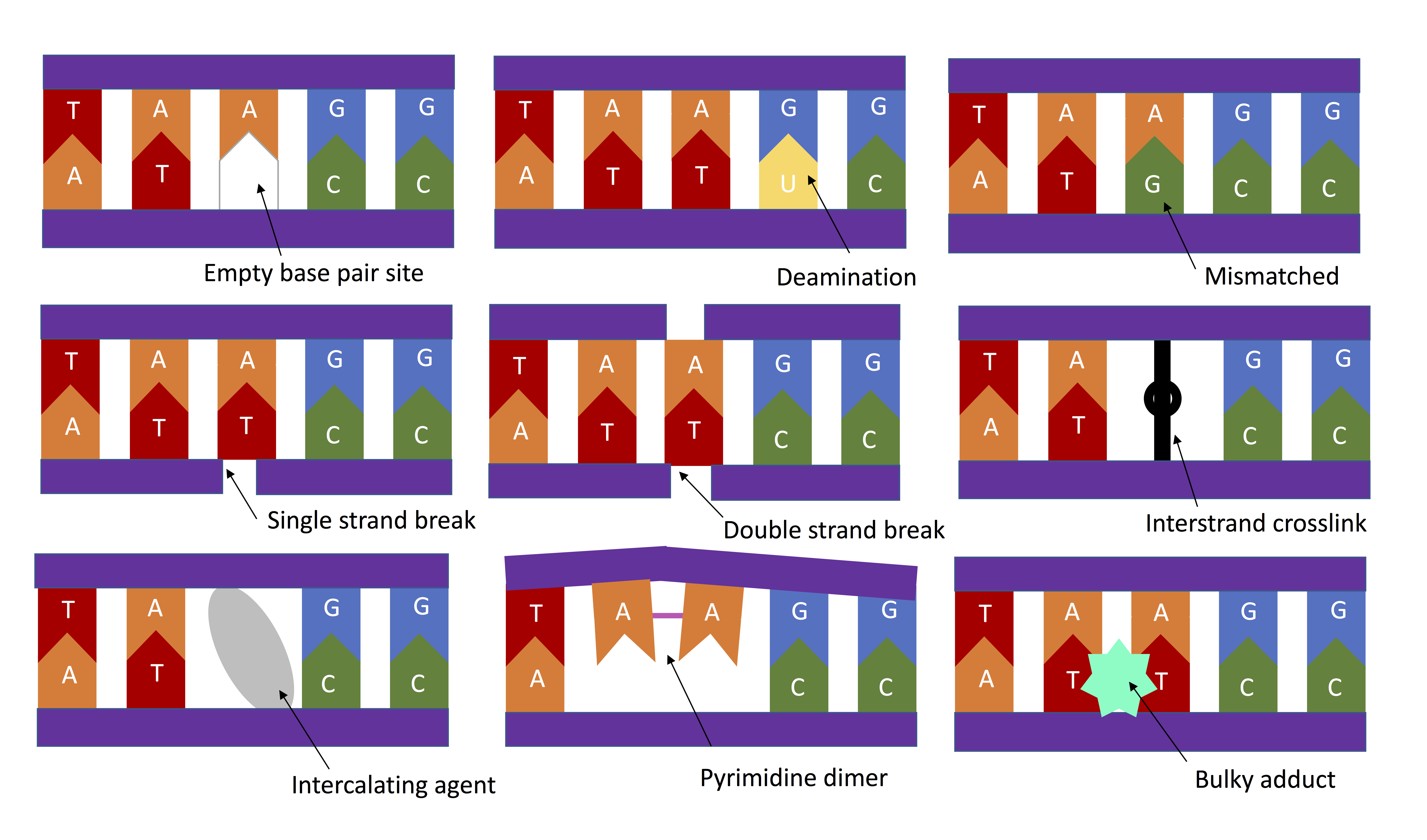
Types of Structural DNA Molecular Lesion Damage

=== Oxidative lesions ===
Oxidative lesions are an umbrella category of lesions caused by reactive oxygen species (ROS), reactive nitrogen species (RNS), other byproducts of cellular metabolism, and exogenous factors such as ionizing or ultraviolet radiation. Byproducts of oxidative respiration are the main source of reactive species which cause a background level of oxidative lesions in the cell. DNA and RNA are both affected by this, and it has been found that RNA oxidative lesions are more abundant in humans compared to DNA. This may be due to cytoplasmic RNA having closer proximity to the electron transport chain. Known oxidative lesions characterized in DNA and RNA are many in number, as oxidized products are unstable and may resolve quickly. The hydroxyl radical and singlet oxygen are common reactive oxygen species responsible for these lesions. 8-oxo-guanine (8-oxoG) is the most abundant and well characterized oxidative lesion, found in both RNA and DNA. Accumulation of 8-oxoG may cause dire damage within the mitochondria and is thought to be a key player in the aging process. RNA oxidation has direct consequences in the production of proteins. mRNA affected by oxidative lesions is still recognized by ribosome, but the ribosome will undergo stalling and dysfunction. This results in proteins having either decreased expression or truncation, leading to aggregation and general dysfunction.

=== Structural rearrangements ===
- Depurination is caused by hydrolysis and results in loss of the purine base of a nucleic acid. DNA is more prone to this, as the transition state in the depurination reaction has much greater energy in RNA.
- Tautomerization is a chemical reaction that is primarily relevant in the behavior of amino acids and nucleic acids. Both of which are correlated to DNA and RNA. The process of tautomerization of DNA bases occurs during DNA replication. The ability for the wrong tautomer of one of the standard nucleic bases to mispair causes a mutation during the process of DNA replication which can be cytotoxic or mutagenic to the cell. These mispairings can result in transition, transversion, frameshift, deletion, and/or duplication mutations. Some diseases that result from tautomerization induced DNA lesions include Kearns-Sayre syndrome, Fragile X syndrome, Kennedy disease, and Huntington's disease.
- Cytosine deamination commonly occurs under physiological conditions and essentially is the deamination of cytosine. This process yields uracil as its product, which is not a base pair found within DNA. This process causes extensive DNA damage. The rate of this process is slowed down significantly in double-stranded DNA compared to single-stranded DNA.

=== Single and double stranded breaks ===
Single-strand breaks (SSBs) occur when one strand of the DNA double helix experiences breakage of a single nucleotide accompanied by damaged 5'- and/or 3'-termini at this point. One common source of SSBs is due to oxidative attack by physiological reactive oxygen species (ROS) such as hydrogen peroxide. H_{2}O_{2} causes SSBs three times more frequently than double-strand breaks (DSBs). Alternative methods of SSB acquisition include direct disintegration of the oxidized sugar or through DNA base-excision repair (BER) of damaged bases. Additionally, cellular enzymes may perform erroneous activity leading to SSBs or DSBs by a variety of mechanisms. One such example would be when the cleavage complex formed by DNA topoisomerase 1 (TOP1) relaxes DNA during transcription and replication through the transient formation of a nick. While TOP1 normally reseals this nick shortly after, these cleavage complexes may collide with RNA or DNA polymerases or be proximal to other lesions, leading to TOP1-linked SSBs or TOP1-linked DSBs.

=== Chemical adducts ===
A DNA adduct is a segment of DNA that binds to a chemical carcinogen. Some adducts that cause lesions to DNA include oxidatively modified bases, propano-, etheno-, and MDA-induced adducts. 5‐Hydroxymethyluracil is an example of an oxidatively modified base where oxidation of the methyl group of thymine occurs. This adduct interferes with the binding of transcription factors to DNA which can trigger apoptosis or result in deletion mutations. Propano adducts are derived by species generated by lipid peroxidation. For example, HNE is a major toxic product of the process. It regulates the expression of genes that are involved in cell cycle regulation and apoptosis. Some of the aldehydes from lipid peroxidation can be converted to epoxy aldehydes by oxidation reactions. These epoxy aldehydes can damage DNA by producing etheno adducts. An increase in this type of DNA lesion exhibits conditions resulting in oxidative stress which is known to be associated with an increased risk of cancer. Malondialdehyde (MDA) is another highly toxic product from lipid peroxidation and also in the synthesis of prostaglandin. MDA reacts with DNA to form the M1dG adduct which causes DNA lesions.

=== Disease effects ===
Many systems are in place to repair DNA and RNA lesions but it is possible for lesions to escape these measures. This may lead to mutations or large genome abnormalities, which can threaten the cell or organism's ability to live. Several cancers are a result of DNA lesions. Even repair mechanisms to heal the damage may end up causing more damage. Mismatch repair defects, for example, cause instability that predisposes to colorectal and endometrial carcinomas.

DNA lesions in neurons may lead to neurodegenerative disorders such as Alzheimer's, Huntington's, and Parkinson's diseases. These come as a result of neurons generally being associated with high mitochondrial respiration and redox species production, which can damage nuclear DNA. Since these cells often cannot be replaced after being damaged, the damage done to them leads to dire consequences. Other disorders stemming from DNA lesions and their association with neurons include but are not limited to Fragile X syndrome, Friedreich's ataxia, and Spinocerebellar ataxias.

During replication, usually DNA polymerases are unable to go past the lesioned area, however, some cells are equipped with special polymerases which allow for translesion synthesis (TLS). TLS polymerases allow for the replication of DNA past lesions and risk generating mutations at a high frequency. Common mutations that occur after undergoing this process are point mutations and frameshift mutations. Several diseases come as a result of this process including several cancers and Xeroderma pigmentosum.

The effect of oxidatively damaged RNA has resulted in a number of human diseases and is especially associated with chronic degeneration. This type of damage has been observed in many neurodegenerative diseases such as Amyotrophic lateral sclerosis, Alzheimer's, Parkinson's, dementia with Lewy bodies, and several prion diseases. This list is rapidly growing, and data suggests that RNA oxidation occurs early in the development of these diseases, rather than as an effect of cellular decay. RNA and DNA lesions are both associated with the development of diabetes mellitus type 2.

== Repair mechanisms ==
=== DNA damage response ===
When DNA is damaged such as due to a lesion, a complex signal transduction pathway is activated which is responsible for recognizing the damage and instigating the cell's response for repair. Compared to the other lesion repair mechanisms, DDR is the highest level of repair and is employed for the most complex lesions. DDR consists of various pathways, the most common of which are the DDR kinase signaling cascades. These are controlled by phosphatidylinositol 3-kinase-related kinases (PIKK), and range from DNA-dependent protein kinase (DNA-PKcs) and Ataxia telangiectasia mutated (ATM) most involved in repairing DSBs to the more versatile Ataxia telangiectasia and Rad3 related (ATR). ATR is crucial to human cell viability, while ATM mutations cause the severe disorder ataxia-telangiectasia leading to neurodegeneration, cancer, and immunodeficiency. These three DDR kinases all recognize damage via protein-protein interactions which localize the kinases to the areas of damage. Next, further protein-protein interactions and posttranslational modifications (PTMs) complete the kinase activation, and a series of phosphorylation events takes place. DDR kinases perform repair regulation at three levels - via PTMs, at the level of chromatin, and at the level of the nucleus.

BER Pathway

=== Base excision repair ===
Base excision repair (BER) is responsible for removing damaged bases in DNA. This mechanism specifically works on excising small base lesions which do not distort the DNA double helix, in contrast to the nucleotide excision repair pathway which is employed in correcting more prominent distorting lesions. DNA glycosylases initiate BER by both recognizing the faulty or incorrect bases and then removing them, forming AP sites lacking any purine or pyrimidine. AP endonuclease then cleaves the AP site, and the single-strand break is either processed by short-patch BER to replace a single nucleotide long-patch BER to create 2-10 replacement nucleotides.

=== Single stranded break repair ===
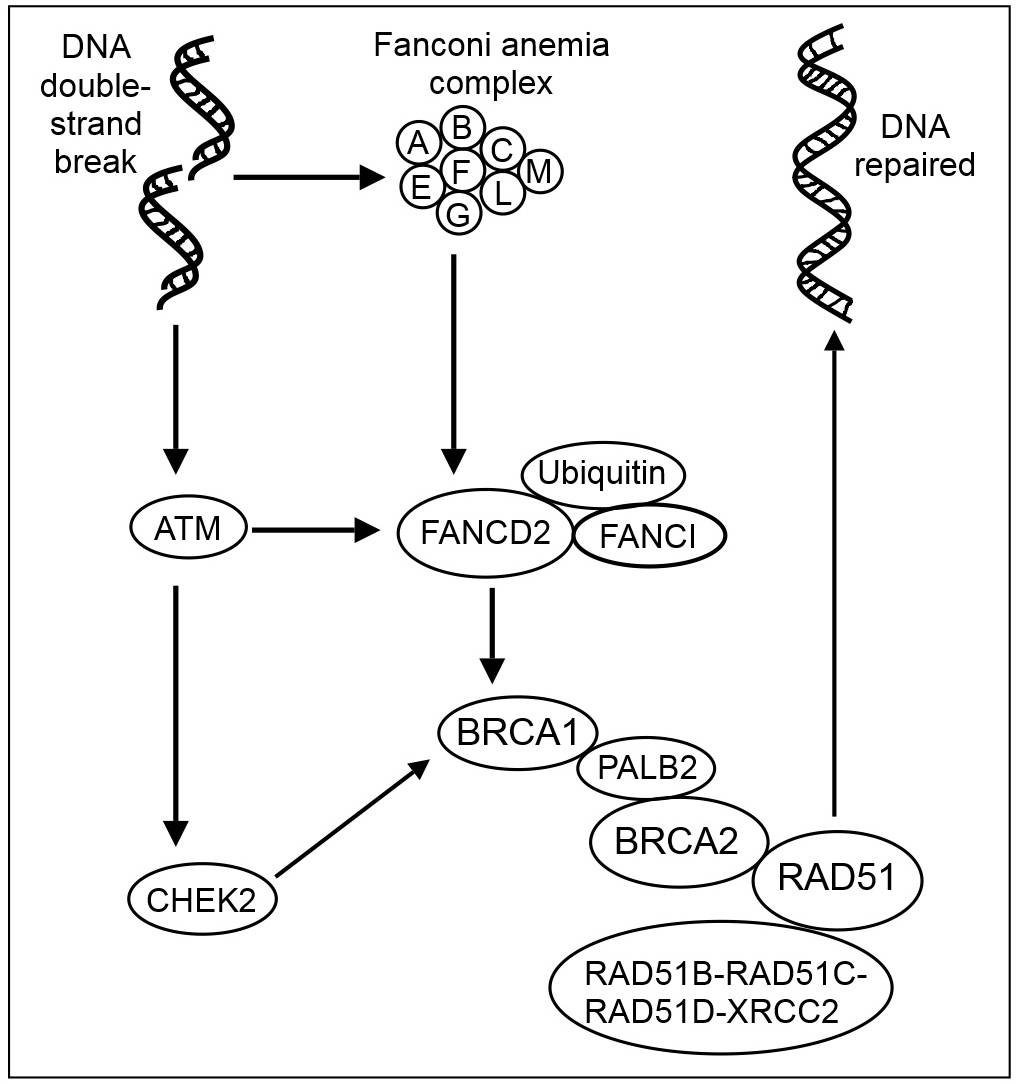
DNA DSB Repair System

Single-stranded breaks (SSBs) can severely threaten genetic stability and cell survival if not quickly and properly repaired, so cells have developed fast and efficient SSB repair (SSBR) mechanisms. While global SSBR systems extract SSBs throughout the genome and during interphase, S-phase specific SSBR processes work together with homologous recombination at the replication forks.

=== Double stranded break repair ===
Double-stranded breaks (DSB) are a threat to all organisms as they can cause cell death and cancer. They can be caused exogenously as a result of radiation and endogenously from errors in replication or encounters with DNA lesions by the replication fork. DSB repair occurs through a variety of different pathways and mechanisms in order to correctly repair these errors.

=== Nucleotide excision repair ===
Nucleotide excision repair (NER) is one of the main mechanisms used to remove bulky adducts from DNA lesions caused by chemotherapy drugs, environmental mutagens, and most importantly UV radiation. This mechanism functions by releasing a short damage containing oligonucleotide from the DNA site, and then that gap is filled in and repaired by NER. NER recognizes a variety of structurally unrelated DNA lesions due to the flexibility of the mechanism itself, as NER is highly sensitive to changes in the DNA helical structure. Bulky adducts seem to trigger NER. The XPC-RAD23-CETN2 heterotrimer involved with NER has a critical role in DNA lesion recognition. In addition to other general lesions in the genome, UV damaged DNA binding protein complex (UV-DDB) also has an important role in both recognition and repair of UV-induced DNA photolesions.

=== DNA mismatch repair ===
DNA mismatch repair (MMR) mechanisms within the cell correct base mispairs that occur during replication using a variety of pathways. It has a high affinity for targeting DNA lesions with specificity, as alternations in base pair stacking that occur at DNA lesion sites affect the helical structure. This is likely one of many signals that triggers MMR.
