= Reactive sulfur species =

Reactive sulfur species (RSS) are a family of sulfur-based chemical compounds often containing catenated sulfur chains and characterized by their intrinsic reactivity, especially with thiols. They are often formed by the oxidation of thiols and disulfides into higher oxidation states. While the term "reactive sulfur species" has not been rigorously defined, the following species are generally agreed to belong to this family:

- Hydropersulfides
- Organic polysulfides
- Inorganic polysulfides and polysulfanes

The following species are sometimes defined as reactive sulfur species in the literature, but without widespread consensus:

- Hydrogen sulfide
- Disulfides
- Cyclo-octasulfur (elemental sulfur)
- Thiosulfate
- Polythionates
- Sulfenic acids
- Thiosulfinates
- Sulfanyl and thiyl radicals
- S-nitrosothiols, thionitrite (SNO^{–}), and perthionitrite (SSNO^{–})

In an effort to categorize these disparate species by shared chemical and biological properties, subdivisions of RSS have been defined:

- Sulfane sulfur species are defined as molecules containing sulfur with an oxidation state of 0: sulfur atoms bonded only to another sulfur and/or an ionizable hydrogen and capable of tautomerizing to a thiosulfoxide. This would include all of the first group (hydropersulfide, polysulfides and polysulfanes) as well as elemental sulfur, thiosulfate and polythionate. This group excludes hydrogen sulfide, which is significantly deprotonated to hydrosulfide ion at physiological pH and contains no catenated sulfur.
- Supersulfides are strictly defined as only the first group and elemental sulfur. This definition encompasses hydropersulfides and sulfur species with which they exist in equilibrium. This term is most commonly used in the context of redox biology, where hydropersulfides act chemically as radical-trapping antioxidants and biochemically as the primary effectors of hydrogen sulfide signaling via persulfidation of protein cysteine residues.

== See also ==
- Reactive oxygen species
- Reactive nitrogen species
- Reactive carbonyl species
