= Ethylmalonic encephalopathy =

- Ethylmalonic encephalopathy has an autosomal recessive pattern of inheritance.
- Specialty: Medical genetics

Ethylmalonic encephalopathy (EE) is a rare autosomal recessive inborn error of metabolism. Patients affected with EE are typically identified shortly after birth, with symptoms including diarrhea, petechiae and seizures. The genetic defect in EE is thought to involve an impairment in the degradation of sulfide intermediates in the body. Hydrogen sulfide then builds up to toxic levels. EE was initially described in 1994. Most cases of EE have been described in individuals of Mediterranean or Arabic origin.

== Signs and symptoms ==
Neurologic signs and symptoms include progressively delayed development, weak muscle tone (hypotonia), seizures, and abnormal movements. The body's network of blood vessels is also affected. Children with this disorder may experience rashes of tiny red spots (petechiae) caused by bleeding under the skin and blue discoloration in the hands and feet due to reduced oxygen in the blood (acrocyanosis). Chronic diarrhea is another common feature of ethylmalonic encephalopathy. EE is often identified by urine organic acid analysis, the excretion of ethylmalonic acid, methylsuccinic acid, isobutyrylglycine and isovalerylglucine. Patients will also often have elevated thiosulphate concentration in their urine.

The signs and symptoms of ethylmalonic encephalopathy are apparent at birth or begin in the first few months of life. Problems with the nervous system typically worsen over time, and most affected individuals survive only into early childhood. A few children with a milder, chronic form of this disorder have been reported, and there can be considerable phenotypic variation, even within families. The life expectancy of individuals with EE is less than ten years.

== Pathophysiology ==
Mutations in the ETHE1 gene cause ethylmalonic encephalopathy. The ETHE1 gene makes an enzyme that plays an important role in energy production. It is active in mitochondria, which are the energy-producing centers within cells. The ETHE1 gene product is a persulfide dioxygenase responsible for catabolism of the mitotoxic metabolite hydrogen sulfide (H_{2}S) via exhaustive oxidation of glutathione persulfide, which can be formed from glutathione and H_{2}S under oxidizing conditions.

Mutations in the ETHE1 gene lead to the production of a defective version of the enzyme or prevents the enzyme from being made. A lack of the ETHE1 enzyme impairs the ability to make energy in mitochondria via inhibition of cytochrome c oxidase by hydrogen sulfide, leading to the accumulation of lactic acid. Defective catabolism of fatty acids and branched-chain amino acids via β-oxidation leads to the accumulation of excess ethylmalonic acid, which is detected in urine.

Ethylmalonic encephalopathy is an autosomal recessive disorder, which means the defective gene is located on an autosome, and both parents must carry one copy of the defective gene in order to have a child born with the disorder. The parents of a child with an autosomal recessive disorder are usually not affected by the disorder.
