= Nitrotyrosine =

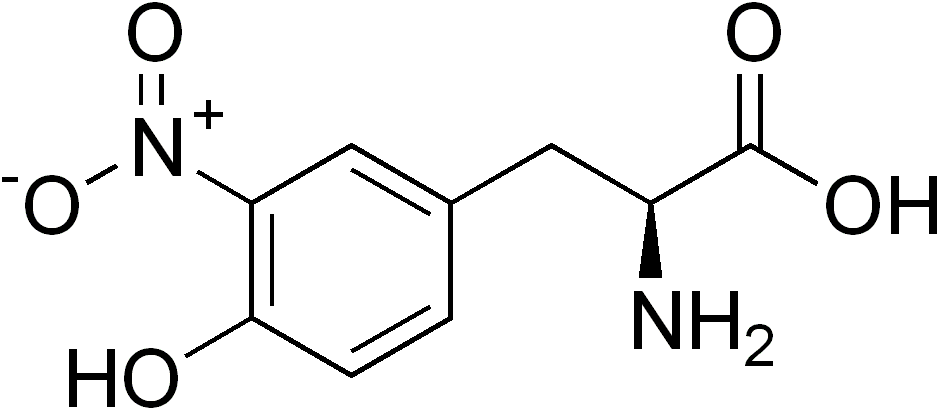

Names
- IUPAC name (2S)-2-Amino-3-(4-hydroxy-3-nitrophenyl)propanoic acid
- Other names 3-Nitro-L-tyrosine; 3-Nitrotyrosine

Identifiers
| CAS Number | 621-44-3 |
| 3D model (JSmol) | Interactive image |
| ChEBI | CHEBI:44454 |
| ChemSpider | 58633 |
| DrugBank | DB03867 |
| ECHA InfoCard | 100.009.718 |
| PubChem CID | 65124 |
| UNII | 7COY1HA6HK |
| CompTox Dashboard (EPA) | DTXSID80863216 DTXSID20904132, DTXSID80863216 |
- InChI: InChI=1S/C9H10N2O5/c10-6(9(13)14)3-5-1-2-8(12)7(4-5)11(15)16/h1-2,4,6,12H,3,10H2,(H,13,14)/t6-/m0/s1 Key: FBTSQILOGYXGMD-LURJTMIESA-N; InChI=1/C9H10N2O5/c10-6(9(13)14)3-5-1-2-8(12)7(4-5)11(15)16/h1-2,4,6,12H,3,10H2,(H,13,14)/t6-/m0/s1 Key: FBTSQILOGYXGMD-LURJTMIEBK
- SMILES: O=[N+]([O-])c1cc(ccc1O)C[C@@H](C(=O)O)N

Properties
| Chemical formula | C_{9}H_{10}N_{2}O_{5} |
| Molar mass | 226.19 g/mol |
| Appearance | Yellow to green crystalline solid |
| Melting point | 233 to 235 °C (451 to 455 °F; 506 to 508 K) (decomposes) |
- Except where otherwise noted, data are given for materials in their standard state (at 25 °C [77 °F], 100 kPa). verify (what is ?) Infobox references

Nitrotyrosine is a product of tyrosine nitration mediated by reactive nitrogen species such as peroxynitrite anion and nitrogen dioxide. The phenol group in nitrotyrosine is 1000x more acidic than in tyrosine.

== Formation ==
Nitrotyrosine is identified as an indicator or marker of cell damage, inflammation as well as NO (nitric oxide) production. Nitrotyrosine is formed in the presence of the active metabolite NO. Generally in many disease states, oxidative stress increases the production of superoxide (O_{2}^{−}) and NO forming peroxynitrite (ONOO^{−}) a destructive free radical oxidant. The production of ONOO^{−} is capable of oxidizing several lipoproteins and of nitrating tyrosine residues in many proteins. It is difficult to determine the production of ONOO^{−} so, usually nitrotyrosine in proteins are the detectable marker for indirectly detecting ONOO^{−}. It is detected in large number of pathological conditions and is considered a marker of NO-dependent, reactive nitrogen species-induced nitrative stress. Nitrotyrosine is detected in biological fluids such as plasma, lung aspirants-BALF (Broncho alveolar lining fluid) and urine. Increased level of nitrotyrosine is detected in rheumatoid arthritis, septic shock and coeliac disease. In all these studies nitrotyrosine was undetected in healthy subjects. Nitrotyrosine is also found in numerous other disease-affected tissues, such as the cornea in keratoconus. Peroxynitrite and/or nitrative stress may participate in the pathogenesis of diabetes.

Research shows that nitrotyrosine levels can be reduced by N-acetyl cysteine, which is a precursor to glutathione, one of the body's primary endogenous antioxidants. Nitrotyrosine levels have been linked to cerebral ischemia and edema, for which NAC has also been proven as a potential treatment.

Free nitrotyrosine undergoes metabolism to form 3-nitro-4-hydroxyphenylacetic acid (NHPA) which is excreted in the urine.

Nitrotyrosine, as a marker of reactive oxygen species, has also been linked to degeneration of dopamine neurons. Tyrosine is the precursor to dopamine, a neurotransmitter that's important for motivation, attention, learning, circadian rhythms, and other biological processes.
