= Cell damage =

Damaging changes to a biological cell

Cell damage (also known as cell injury) is a variety of changes of stress that a cell suffers due to external as well as internal environmental changes. Amongst other causes, this can be due to physical, chemical, infectious, biological, nutritional or immunological factors. Cell damage can be reversible or irreversible. Depending on the extent of injury, the cellular response may be adaptive and where possible, homeostasis is restored. Cell death occurs when the severity of the injury exceeds the cell's ability to repair itself. Cell death is relative to both the length of exposure to a harmful stimulus and the severity of the damage caused. Cell death may occur by necrosis or apoptosis.

== Causes ==
- Physical agents such as heat or radiation can damage a cell by literally cooking or coagulating their contents.
- Impaired nutrient supply, such as lack of oxygen or glucose, or impaired production of adenosine triphosphate (ATP) may deprive the cell of essential materials needed to survive.
- Metabolic: Hypoxia and ischemia
- Chemical agents
- Microbial agents: Viruses & bacteria
- Immunologic agents: Allergies and autoimmune diseases, such as Parkinson's and Alzheimer's disease.
- Genetic factors, such as Down's syndrome and sickle cell anemia

== Targets ==
The most notable components of the cell that are targets of cell damage are the DNA and the cell membrane.

- DNA damage: In human cells, both normal metabolic activities and environmental factors such as ultraviolet light and other radiations can cause DNA damage, resulting in as many as one million individual molecular lesions per cell per day.
- Membrane damage: Damage to the cell membrane disturbs the state of cell electrolytes, e.g. calcium, which when constantly increased, induces apoptosis.
- Mitochondrial damage: May occur due to ATP decrease or change in mitochondrial permeability.
- Ribosome damage: Damage to ribosomal and cellular proteins such as protein misfolding, leading to apoptotic enzyme activation.

== Types of damage ==
Some cell damage can be reversed once the stress is removed or if compensatory cellular changes occur. Full function may return to cells but in some cases, a degree of injury will remain.

=== Reversible ===
==== Cellular swelling ====
Cellular swelling (or cloudy swelling) may occur due to cellular hypoxia, which damages the sodium-potassium membrane pump; it is reversible when the cause is eliminated. Cellular swelling is the first manifestation of almost all forms of injury to cells. When it affects many cells in an organ, it causes some pallor, increased turgor, and increase in weight of the organ. On microscopic examination, small clear vacuoles may be seen within the cytoplasm; these represent distended and pinched-off segments of the endoplasmic reticulum. This pattern of non-lethal injury is sometimes called hydropic change or vacuolar degeneration. Hydropic degeneration is a severe form of cloudy swelling. It occurs with hypokalemia due to vomiting or diarrhea.

The ultrastructural changes of reversible cell injury include:

- Blebbing
- Blunting
- distortion of microvilli
- loosening of intercellular attachments
- mitochondrial changes
- dilation of the endoplasmic reticulum

==== Fatty change ====
In fatty change, the cell has been damaged and is unable to adequately metabolize fat. Small vacuoles of fat accumulate and become dispersed within cytoplasm. Mild fatty change may have no effect on cell function; however, more severe fatty change can impair cellular function. In the liver, the enlargement of hepatocytes due to fatty change may compress adjacent bile canaliculi, leading to cholestasis. Depending on the cause and severity of the lipid accumulation, fatty change is generally reversible. Fatty change is also known as fatty degeneration, fatty metamorphosis, or fatty steatosis.

=== Irreversible ===
==== Necrosis ====
Necrosis is characterised by cytoplasmic swelling, irreversible damage to the plasma membrane, and organelle breakdown leading to cell death. The stages of cellular necrosis include pyknosis, the clumping of chromosomes and shrinking of the nucleus of the cell; karyorrhexis, the fragmentation of the nucleus and break up of the chromatin into unstructured granules; and karyolysis, the dissolution of the cell nucleus. Cytosolic components that leak through the damaged plasma membrane into the extracellular space can incur an inflammatory response.

There are six types of necrosis:

- Coagulative necrosis
- Liquefactive necrosis
- Caseous necrosis
- Fat necrosis
- Fibroid necrosis
- Gangrenous necrosis

==== Apoptosis ====
Apoptosis is the programmed cell death of superfluous or potentially harmful cells in the body. It is an energy-dependent process mediated by proteolytic enzymes called caspases, which trigger cell death through the cleaving of specific proteins in the cytoplasm and nucleus. The dying cells shrink and condense into apoptotic bodies. The cell surface is altered so as to display properties that lead to rapid phagocytosis by macrophages or neighbouring cells. Unlike necrotic cell death, neighbouring cells are not damaged by apoptosis as cytosolic products are safely isolated by membranes prior to undergoing phagocytosis. It is considered an important component of various bioprocesses including cell turnover, hormone-dependent atrophy, proper development and functioning of the immune and embryonic system, it also helps in chemical-induced cell death which is genetically mediated. There is some evidence that certain symptoms of "apoptosis" such as endonuclease activation can be spuriously induced without engaging a genetic cascade. It is also becoming clear that mitosis and apoptosis are toggled or linked in some way and that the balance achieved depends on signals received from appropriate growth or survival factors. There are research being conducted to focus on the elucidation and analysis of the cell cycle machinery and signaling pathways that controls cell cycle arrest and apoptosis. In the average adult between 50 and 70 billion cells die each day due to apoptosis. Inhibition of apoptosis can result in a number of cancers, autoimmune diseases, inflammatory diseases, and viral infections. Hyperactive apoptosis can lead to neurodegenerative diseases, hematologic diseases, and tissue damage.

== Repair ==
When a cell is damaged, the body will try to repair or replace the cell to continue normal functions. If a cell dies, the body will remove it and replace it with another functioning cell, or fill the gap with connective tissue to provide structural support for the remaining cells. The motto of the repair process is to fill a gap caused by the damaged cells to regain structural continuity. Normal cells try to regenerate the damaged cells but this cannot always happen.

=== Regeneration ===
Regeneration of parenchyma cells, or the functional cells, of an organism. The body can make more cells to replace the damaged cells keeping the organ or tissue intact and fully functional.

=== Replacement ===
When a cell cannot be regenerated, the body will replace it with stromal connective tissue to maintain tissue or organ function. Stromal cells are the cells that support the parenchymal cells in any organ. Fibroblasts, immune cells, pericytes, and inflammatory cells are the most common types of stromal cells.

== Biochemical changes in cellular injury ==
ATP (adenosine triphosphate) depletion is a common biological alteration that occurs with cellular injury. This change can happen despite the inciting agent of the cell damage. A reduction in intracellular ATP can have a number of functional and morphologic consequences during cell injury. These effects include:

- Failure of the ATP-dependent pumps (Na^{+}/K^{+} pump and Ca^{2+} pump), resulting in a net influx of Na^{+} and Ca^{2+} ions and osmotic swelling.
- ATP-depleted cells begin to undertake anaerobic metabolism to derive energy from glycogen which is known as glycogenolysis.
- A consequent decrease in the intracellular pH of the cell arises, which mediates harmful enzymatic processes.
- Early clumping of nuclear chromatin then occurs, known as pyknosis, and leads to eventual cell death.

== DNA damage and repair ==
=== DNA damage ===
DNA damage (or RNA damage in the case of some virus genomes) appears to be a fundamental problem for life. As noted by Haynes, the subunits of DNA are not endowed with any peculiar kind of quantum mechanical stability, and thus DNA is vulnerable to all the "chemical horrors" that might befall any such molecule in a warm aqueous medium. These chemical horrors are DNA damages that include various types of modification of the DNA bases, single- and double-strand breaks, and inter-strand cross-links (see DNA damage (naturally occurring). DNA damages are distinct from mutations although both are errors in the DNA. Whereas DNA damages are abnormal chemical and structural alterations, mutations ordinarily involve the normal four bases in new arrangements. Mutations can be replicated, and thus inherited when the DNA replicates. In contrast, DNA damages are altered structures that cannot, themselves, be replicated.

Several different repair processes can remove DNA damages (see chart in DNA repair). However, those DNA damages that remain un-repaired can have detrimental consequences. DNA damages may block replication or gene transcription. These blockages can lead to cell death. In multicellular organisms, cell death in response to DNA damage may occur by a programmed process, apoptosis. Alternatively, when DNA polymerase replicates a template strand containing a damaged site, it may inaccurately bypass the damage and, as a consequence, introduce an incorrect base leading to a mutation. Experimentally, mutation rates increase substantially in cells defective in DNA mismatch repair or in Homologous recombinational repair (HRR).

In both prokaryotes and eukaryotes, DNA genomes are vulnerable to attack by reactive chemicals naturally produced in the intracellular environment and by agents from external sources. An important internal source of DNA damage in both prokaryotes and eukaryotes is reactive oxygen species (ROS) formed as byproducts of normal aerobic metabolism. For eukaryotes, oxidative reactions are a major source of DNA damage (see DNA damage (naturally occurring) and Sedelnikova et al.). In humans, about 10,000 oxidative DNA damages occur per cell per day. In the rat, which has a higher metabolic rate than humans, about 100,000 oxidative DNA damages occur per cell per day. In aerobically growing bacteria, ROS appear to be a major source of DNA damage, as indicated by the observation that 89% of spontaneously occurring base substitution mutations are caused by introduction of ROS-induced single-strand damages followed by error-prone replication past these damages. Oxidative DNA damages usually involve only one of the DNA strands at any damaged site, but about 1–2% of damages involve both strands. The double-strand damages include double-strand breaks (DSBs) and inter-strand crosslinks. For humans, the estimated average number of endogenous DNA DSBs per cell occurring at each cell generation is about 50. This level of formation of DSBs likely reflects the natural level of damages caused, in large part, by ROS produced by active metabolism.

=== Repair of DNA damages ===
Five major pathways are employed in repairing different types of DNA damages. These five pathways are nucleotide excision repair, base excision repair, mismatch repair, non-homologous end-joining and homologous recombinational repair (HRR) (see chart in DNA repair) and reference. Only HRR can accurately repair double-strand damages, such as DSBs. The HRR pathway requires that a second homologous chromosome be available to allow recovery of the information lost by the first chromosome due to the double-strand damage.

DNA damage appears to play a key role in mammalian aging, and an adequate level of DNA repair promotes longevity (see DNA damage theory of aging and reference.). In addition, an increased incidence of DNA damage and/or reduced DNA repair cause an increased risk of cancer (see Cancer, Carcinogenesis and Neoplasm) and reference). Furthermore, the ability of HRR to accurately and efficiently repair double-strand DNA damages likely played a key role in the evolution of sexual reproduction (see Evolution of sexual reproduction and reference). In extant eukaryotes, HRR during meiosis provides the major benefit of maintaining fertility.

== See also ==
- Cellular adaptation
