= Reactive oxygen species =

Highly reactive molecules formed from diatomic oxygen (O2)

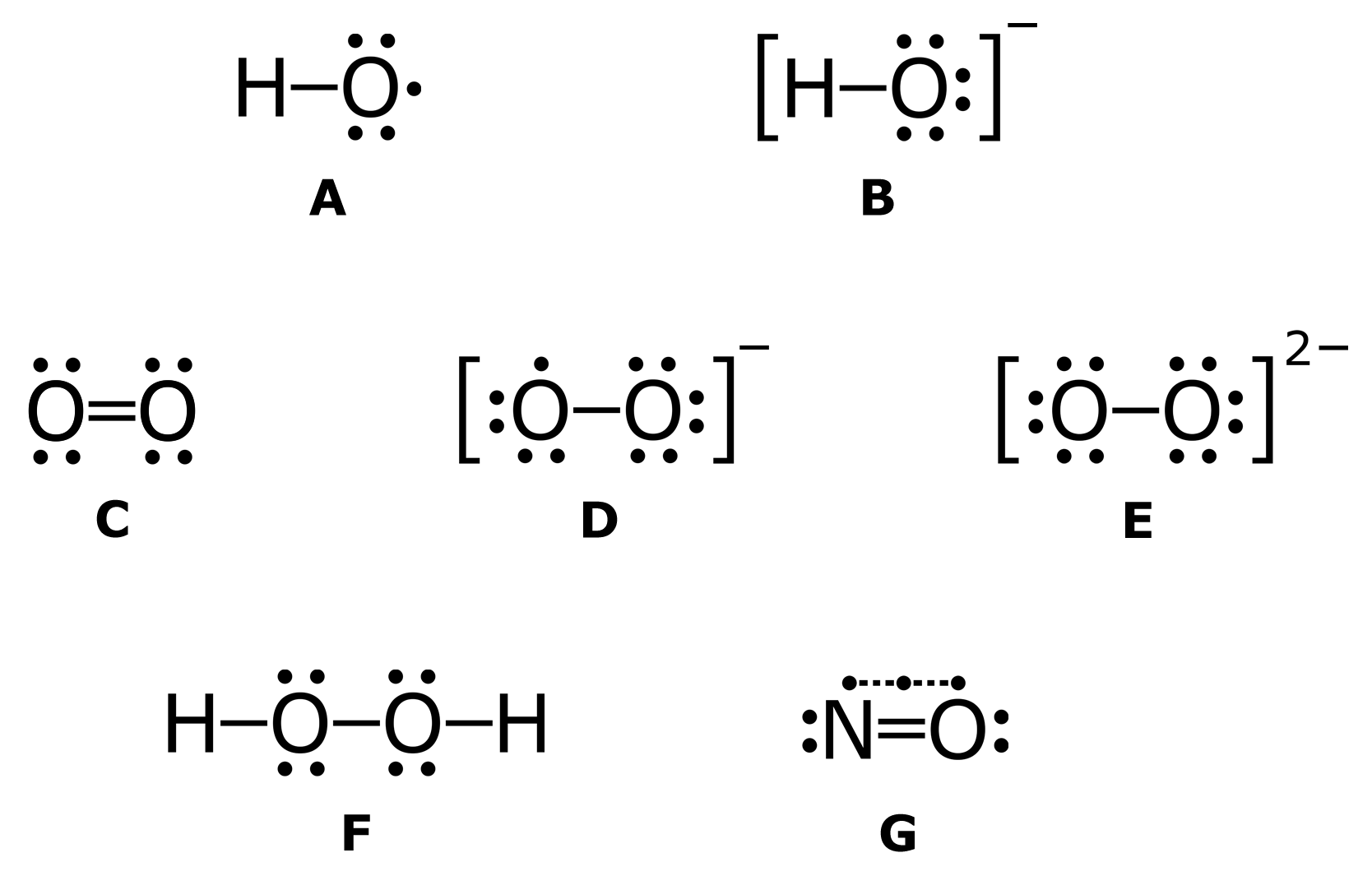
Lewis structure of some of the reactive oxygen species. A: hydroxyl radical (HO^{•}); B: hydroxide ion (HO^{−}); C: singlet oxygen (^{1}O_{2}); D: superoxide anion (O_{2}^{•−}); E: peroxide ion (O^{2−}_{2}); F: hydrogen peroxide (H_{2}O_{2}); G: nitric oxide (NO^{•})

Reactive oxygen species (ROS) are oxygen-derived molecules produced naturally by cells and by environmental factors. At controlled levels, they help regulate cell signaling and immune defenses; when they build up faster than antioxidant systems can remove them, they can damage DNA, proteins, and fats (lipid peroxidation)—a state called oxidative stress.

In chemistry and biology, ROS are highly reactive chemical species formed from diatomic oxygen (O_{2}), water radiolysis, and hydrogen peroxide (H_{2}O_{2}). Some prominent ROS are the hydroperoxide radical or hydroperoxyl (HO_{2}^{•}), its deprotonated form, the superoxide anion (O_{2}^{•−}), the hydroxyl radical (HO^{•}), and singlet oxygen (^{1}O_{2}). ROS are pervasive because they are readily produced from O_{2}, which is abundant in the Earth's atmosphere (21 vol%) and is present in the dissolved state in biological fluids (O_{2} solubility in water ~2×10^{–4} mol/L).

Biologically, ROS function as cell signals, are intermediates in the redox behavior of O_{2}, and impact the process of aging when insufficiently, or too slowly, scavenged by reducing agents such as glutathione.

== Definition ==
Reactive oxygen species (ROS) are not uniformly defined, but generally include superoxide, singlet oxygen, and hydroxyl radical. Hydrogen peroxide is not nearly as reactive as these species, but is readily activated and is thus included. Peroxynitrite and nitric oxide are also reactive oxygen-containing species.

- Hydroxyl radical (HO·) is generated by Fenton reaction of hydrogen peroxide with ferrous compounds and related reducing agents:

Fe(II) + H_{2}O_{2} → Fe(III)OH + HO·

In its fleeting existence, the hydroxyl radical reacts rapidly and irreversibly with all organic compounds.

- Superoxide (·O^{−}_{2}) is produced by reduction of O_{2}. Several grams are produced per day in the human body within the mitochondria:

O_{2} + e^{−} → ·O^{−}_{2}

Competing with its formation, superoxide is destroyed by the action of superoxide dismutases, enzymes that catalyze its disproportionation:

2 ·O^{−}_{2} + 2H^{+} → O_{2} + H_{2}O_{2}

- Hydrogen peroxide (H_{2}O_{2}) is also produced as a side product of respiration.
- Peroxynitrite (ONO^{−}_{2}) results from the reaction of superoxide and nitric oxide.
- Singlet oxygen (^{1}O_{2}) is sometimes included as an ROS. Photosensitizers such as chlorophyll may convert triplet (^{3}O_{2}) to singlet oxygen. Singlet oxygen is highly reactive with unsaturated organic compounds. Carotenoids, tocopherols, and plastoquinones contained in chloroplasts quench singlet oxygen and protect against its toxic effects. Oxidized products of β-carotene arising from the presence of singlet oxygen act as second messengers that can either protect against singlet oxygen-induced toxicity or initiate programmed cell death. Levels of jasmonate play a key role in the decision between cell acclimation and cell death in response to elevated levels of this reactive oxygen species.

== Function ==
In a biological context, ROS are byproducts of normal oxygen metabolism. ROS have roles in cell signaling and homeostasis. ROS are intrinsic to cellular functioning, and are present at low and stationary levels in normal cells. In plants, ROS are involved in metabolic processes related to photoprotection and tolerance to various types of stress. However, ROS can cause irreversible damage to DNA as they oxidize and modify some cellular components and prevent them from performing their original functions. This suggests that ROS has a dual role; whether they will act as harmful, protective or signaling factors depends on the balance between ROS production and disposal at the right time and place. In other words, oxygen toxicity can arise both from uncontrolled production and from the inefficient elimination of ROS by the antioxidant system. ROS are intermediates in the redox behavior of O_{2}, which is central to fuel cells.

During times of environmental stress (e.g., UV or heat exposure), ROS levels can increase dramatically. This may result in significant damage to cell structures. Cumulatively, this is known as oxidative stress. The production of ROS is strongly influenced by stress-factor responses in plants; factors that increase ROS production include drought, salinity, chilling, defense against pathogens, nutrient deficiency, metal toxicity, and UV-B radiation. ROS are also generated by exogenous sources such as ionizing radiation generating irreversible effects in the development of tissues in both animals and plants. ROS have been demonstrated to modify the visual appearance of fish. This potentially affects their behavior and ecology, such as their temperature control, their visual communication, their reproduction and survival.

ROS are central to the photodegradation of organic pollutants in the atmosphere (a.o., methane (CH_{4}), a powerful greenhouse gas, and hydrocarbons).

== Sources of ROS production ==
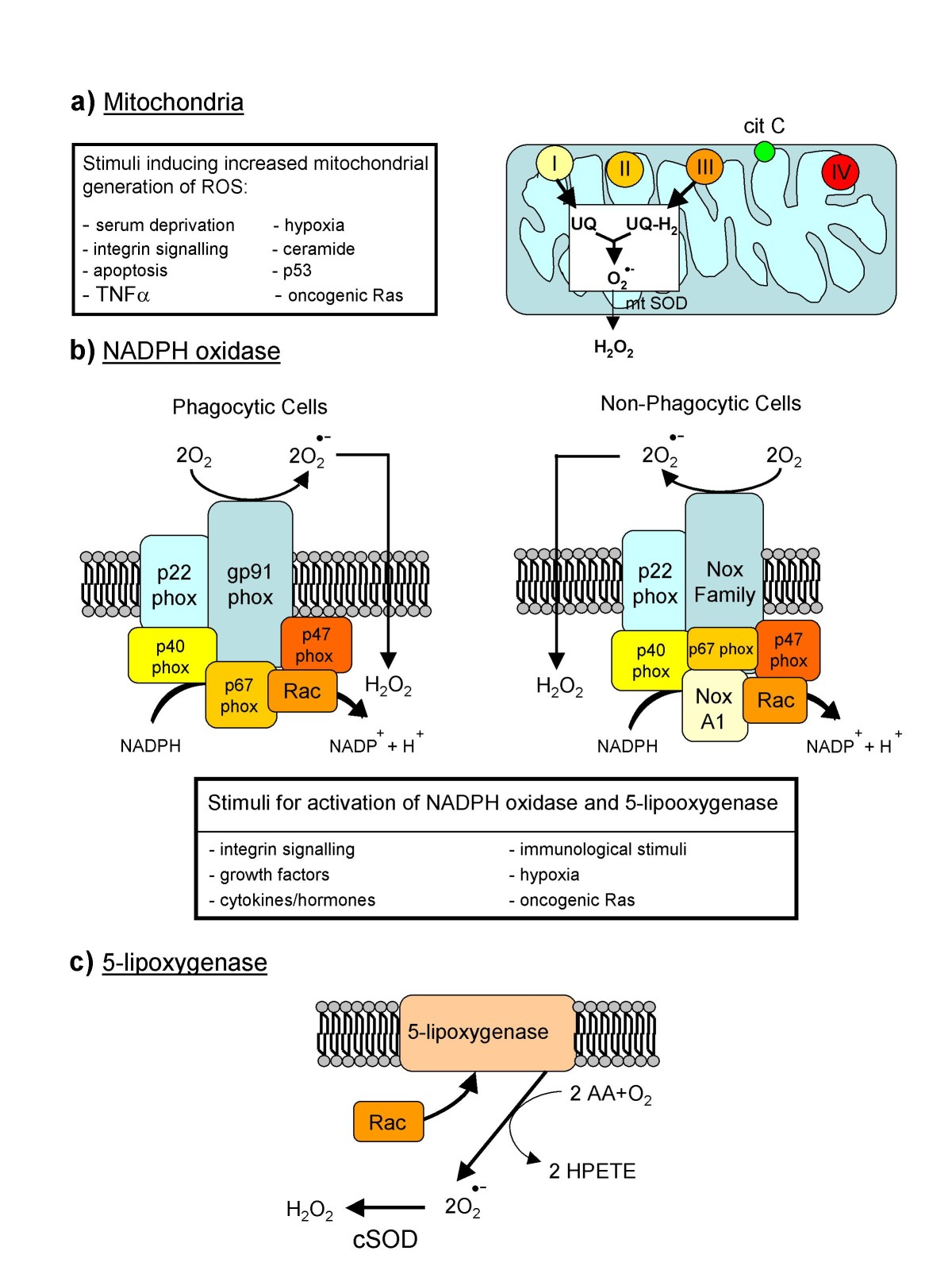
Major cellular sources of ROS in living non-photosynthetic cells. From a review by Novo and Parola, 2008.

=== Endogenous sources ===
ROS are produced during the processes of respiration and photosynthesis in organelles such as mitochondria, peroxisomes and chloroplasts. During the respiration process the mitochondria convert energy for the cell into a usable form, adenosine triphosphate (ATP). The process of ATP production in the mitochondria, called oxidative phosphorylation, involves the transport of protons (hydrogen ions) across the inner mitochondrial membrane via the electron transport chain. In the electron transport chain, electrons are passed through a series of proteins via oxidation-reduction reactions, with each acceptor protein along the chain having a greater reduction potential than the previous. The last destination for an electron along this chain is an oxygen molecule. In normal conditions, the oxygen is reduced to produce water; however, in about 0.1–2% of electrons passing through the chain (this number derives from studies in isolated mitochondria, though the exact rate in live organisms is yet to be fully agreed upon), oxygen is instead prematurely and incompletely reduced to give the superoxide radical (^{•}O^{−}_{2}), most well documented for Complex I and Complex III.

Another source of ROS production in animal cells is the electron transfer reactions catalyzed by the mitochondrial P450 systems in steroidogenic tissues. These P450 systems are dependent on the transfer of electrons from NADPH to P450. During this process, some electrons "leak" and react with O_{2}, producing superoxide. To cope with this natural source of ROS, the steroidogenic tissues, the ovary and testis, have high concentrations of antioxidants such as vitamin C (ascorbate) and β-carotene, as well as antioxidant enzymes.

If too much damage occurs in the mitochondria, a cell undergoes apoptosis, or programmed cell death.

In addition, ROS are produced in immune cell signaling via the NOX pathway. Phagocytic cells such as neutrophils, eosinophils, and mononuclear phagocytes produce ROS when stimulated.

In chloroplasts, the carboxylation and oxygenation reactions catalyzed by rubisco ensure that the functioning of the electron transport chain (ETC) occurs in an environment rich in O_{2}. Electron leakage in the ETC will inevitably produce ROS within chloroplasts. ETC in photosystem I (PSI) was once believed to be the only source of ROS in chloroplasts. The flow of electrons from the excited reaction centers is directed to the NADP and these are reduced to NADPH, and then they enter the Calvin cycle and reduce the final electron acceptor, CO_{2}. In cases where there is an ETC overload, part of the electron flow is diverted from ferredoxin to O_{2}, forming the superoxide free radical (by the Mehler reaction). In addition, electron leakage to O_{2} can also occur from the 2Fe-2S and 4Fe-4S clusters in the PSI ETC. However, PSII also provides electron leakage locations (QA, QB) for O_{2}-producing O_{2}-. Superoxide (O_{2}-) is generated from PSII, instead of PSI; QB is shown as the location for the generation of O_{2}•-.

=== Exogenous sources ===
The formation of ROS can be stimulated by a variety of agents such as pollutants, heavy metals, allergens, cigarette smoke, drugs, insecticides, ozone, pesticides, toxins, UV radiation. In plants, in addition to the action of dry abiotic factors, high temperature, interaction with other living beings can influence the production of ROS.

In a process termed radiolysis, through the interaction of water and ionizing radiation, damaging intermediates can be generated. In the process, a water molecule gets excited and subsequently dissociates into a hydrogen (^{•}H) and a hydroxyl radical (^{•}OH), which both are highly reactive. The radicals may attack cells and molecules on the cell surface, and through a chain reaction, dozens of molecules can be damaged by the homolysis of a single water molecule.

In plants, the production of ROS during abiotic stress events can reduce or interrupt metabolic activity. For example, increases in temperature and drought are factors that limit the availability of CO_{2} due to stomatal closure, increasing the production of ROS, such as O_{2}·- and ^{1}O_{2} in chloroplasts. The production of ^{1}O_{2} in chloroplasts can cause reprogramming of the expression of nucleus genes leading to chlorosis and programmed cell death. In cases of biotic stress, ROS initially form rapidly at low concentration levels, then become more sustained and persistent. The first phase of ROS accumulation is associated with plant infection and is probably independent of the synthesis of new ROS-generating enzymes. However, the second phase of ROS accumulation is associated only with infection by non-virulent pathogens and is an induced response dependent on increased transcription of mRNA encoding enzymes.

== Antioxidant enzymes ==
=== Superoxide dismutase ===
Superoxide dismutases (SOD) are a class of enzymes that catalyze the dismutation of superoxide into oxygen and hydrogen peroxide. As such, they are an important antioxidant defense in nearly all cells exposed to oxygen. In mammals and most chordates, three forms of superoxide dismutase are present. SOD1 is located primarily in the cytoplasm, SOD2 in the mitochondria, and SOD3 is extracellular. The first is a dimer (two subunits), while the others are tetramers (four subunits). SOD1 and SOD3 contain copper and zinc ions, while SOD2 has a manganese ion in its reactive centre. The genes are located on chromosomes 21, 6, and 4, respectively (21q22.1, 6q25.3 and 4p15.3-p15.1).

The SOD-catalysed dismutation of superoxide may be written with the following half-reactions:

$$\begin{align}
& \ce{M}^{(n+1)+}  + \ce{O2- ->[SOD]}\  \ce{M}^{n+} + \ce{O2} \\
& \ce{M}^{n+} + \ce{O2- + 2H+ ->[SOD]}\ \ce{M}^{(n+1)+} + \ce{H2O2}
\end{align}$$

where M = Cu (n = 1); Mn (n = 2); Fe (n = 2); Ni (n = 2).

In this reaction the oxidation state of the metal cation oscillates between n and n + 1.

Catalase, which is concentrated in peroxisomes located next to mitochondria, reacts with the hydrogen peroxide to catalyze the formation of water and oxygen. Glutathione peroxidase reduces hydrogen peroxide by transferring the energy of the reactive peroxides to a sulfur-containing tripeptide called glutathione. The sulfur contained in these enzymes acts as the reactive center, carrying reactive electrons from the peroxide to the glutathione. Peroxiredoxins also degrade H_{2}O_{2}, within the mitochondria, cytosol, and nucleus.

$$\begin{align}
& \ce{2 H2O2 ->[\text{catalase}] 2 H2O{} + O2} \\
& \ce{2GSH{} + H2O2 ->[\text{glutathione peroxidase}] GS-SG{} + 2H2O}
\end{align}$$

== Damaging effects ==
Potential free radical mechanisms in tissue injury

Effects of ROS on cell metabolism are well documented in a variety of species. These include not only roles in apoptosis (programmed cell death) but also positive effects such as the induction of host defence genes and mobilization of ion transporters. This implicates them in control of cellular function. In particular, platelets involved in wound repair and blood homeostasis release ROS to recruit additional platelets to sites of injury. These also provide a link to the adaptive immune system via the recruitment of leukocytes.

Reactive oxygen species are implicated in cellular activity in a variety of inflammatory responses, including cardiovascular disease. They may also be involved in hearing impairment via cochlear damage induced by elevated sound levels, in ototoxicity of drugs such as cisplatin, and in congenital deafness in both animals and humans. ROS are also implicated in mediation of apoptosis or programmed cell death and ischaemic injury. Specific examples include stroke and heart attack.

In general, the harmful effects of reactive oxygen species on the cell are the damage of DNA or RNA, oxidation of polyunsaturated fatty acids in lipids (lipid peroxidation), oxidation of amino acids in proteins, and oxidative deactivation of specific enzymes by oxidation of co-factors. They play a role in causing dangerous genetic mutations.

=== Pathogen response ===
When a plant recognizes an attacking pathogen, one of the first induced reactions is to rapidly produce superoxide (O^{−}_{2}) or hydrogen peroxide (H_{2}O_{2}) to strengthen the cell wall. This prevents the pathogen from spreading to other parts of the plant, essentially by forming a net that restricts its movement and reproduction.

In the mammalian host, ROS is induced as an antimicrobial defense. To highlight the importance of this defense, individuals with chronic granulomatous disease who have deficiencies in generating ROS are highly susceptible to infection by a broad range of microbes including Salmonella enterica, Staphylococcus aureus, Serratia marcescens, and Aspergillus spp.

Studies on the homeostasis of the Drosophila melanogasters intestines have shown the production of ROS as a key component of the immune response in the gut of the fly. ROS acts both as a bactericide, damaging the bacterial DNA, RNA and proteins, as well as a signalling molecule that induces repair mechanisms of the epithelium. The uracil released by microorganisms triggers the production and activity of DUOX, the ROS-producing enzyme in the intestine. DUOX activity is induced according to the level of uracil in the gut; under basal conditions, it is down-regulated by the protein kinase MkP3. The tight regulation of DUOX avoids excessive production of ROS. It facilitates differentiation between benign and damage-inducing microorganisms in the gut.

The manner in which ROS defends the host from invading microbes is not fully understood. One of the more likely modes of defense is damage to microbial DNA. Studies using Salmonella demonstrated that DNA repair mechanisms were required to resist killing by ROS. A role for ROS in antiviral defense mechanisms has been demonstrated by Rig-like helicase-1 and mitochondrial antiviral signaling protein. Increased levels of ROS potentiate signaling through this mitochondria-associated antiviral receptor activating interferon regulatory factor (IRF)-3, IRF-7, and nuclear factor kappa B (NF-κB), resulting in an antiviral state. Respiratory epithelial cells induce mitochondrial ROS in response to influenza infection. This ROS induction led to the induction of type III interferon and an antiviral state, limiting viral replication. In host defense against mycobacteria, ROS play a role, although direct killing is likely not the key mechanism; rather, ROS likely affect ROS-dependent signalling controls, such as cytokine production, autophagy, and granuloma formation.

Reactive oxygen species are also implicated in activation, anergy and apoptosis of T cells.

=== Oxidative damage ===
In aerobic organisms the energy needed to fuel biological functions is produced in the mitochondria via the electron transport chain. Reactive oxygen species (ROS) capable of causing cellular damage are produced during energy release. ROS can damage lipids, DNA, RNA, and proteins, which, in theory, contributes to the physiology of aging.

ROS are produced as a normal product of cellular metabolism. In particular, one major contributor to oxidative damage is hydrogen peroxide (H_{2}O_{2}), which is converted from superoxide that leaks from the mitochondria. Catalase and superoxide dismutase ameliorate the damaging effects of hydrogen peroxide and superoxide, respectively, by converting these compounds into oxygen and hydrogen peroxide (which is later converted to water), resulting in the production of benign molecules. However, this conversion is not 100% efficient, and residual peroxides persist in the cell. While ROS are produced as a product of normal cellular functioning, excessive amounts can cause deleterious effects.

=== Cell death ===
A cancer cell can die in three ways: apoptosis, necrosis, and autophagy. Excessive ROS can induce apoptosis through both the extrinsic and intrinsic pathways. In the extrinsic pathway of apoptosis, ROS are generated by Fas ligand as an upstream event for Fas activation via phosphorylation, which is necessary for subsequent recruitment of Fas-associated protein with death domain and caspase 8 as well as apoptosis induction. In the intrinsic pathway, ROS function to facilitate cytochrome c release by activating pore-stabilizing proteins (Bcl-2 and Bcl-xL) as well as inhibiting pore-destabilizing proteins (Bcl-2-associated X protein, Bcl-2 homologous antagonist/killer). The intrinsic pathway is also known as the caspase cascade and is induced through mitochondrial damage which triggers the release of cytochrome c. DNA damage, oxidative stress, and loss of mitochondrial membrane potential lead to the release of the pro-apoptotic proteins mentioned above, stimulating apoptosis. Mitochondrial damage is closely linked to apoptosis, and since mitochondria are easily targeted, there is potential for cancer therapy.

The cytotoxic nature of ROS is a driving force behind apoptosis. Still, in even higher amounts, ROS can result in both apoptosis and necrosis, a form of uncontrolled cell death, in cancer cells.

Numerous studies have shown the pathways and associations between ROS levels and apoptosis. Still, a newer line of study has connected ROS levels and autophagy. ROS can also induce cell death through autophagy, which is a self-catabolic process involving sequestration of cytoplasmic contents (exhausted or damaged organelles and protein aggregates) for degradation in lysosomes. Therefore, autophagy can also regulate the cell's health in times of oxidative stress. Autophagy can be induced by ROS levels through many pathways in the cell in an attempt to dispose of harmful organelles and prevent damage, such as carcinogens, without inducing apoptosis. Autophagic cell death can be prompted by the overexpression of autophagy, where the cell digests too much of itself in an attempt to minimize the damage and can no longer survive. When this type of cell death occurs, an increase or decrease in the control of autophagy-regulating genes is commonly observed. Thus, once a more in-depth understanding of autophagic cell death is attained. Its relation to ROS, this form of programmed cell death may serve as a future cancer therapy.

Autophagy and apoptosis are distinct mechanisms of cell death induced by high levels of ROS. Autophagy and apoptosis, however, rarely act through strictly independent pathways. There is a clear connection between ROS and autophagy, and excessive ROS levels are associated with apoptosis. The depolarization of the mitochondrial membrane is also characteristic of the initiation of autophagy. When mitochondria are damaged and begin releasing ROS, autophagy is initiated to dispose of the damaged organelle. If a drug targets mitochondria and generates ROS, autophagy may dispose of so many mitochondria and other damaged organelles that the cell becomes nonviable. The extensive amount of ROS and mitochondrial damage may also signal for apoptosis. The balance of autophagy within the cell and the crosstalk between autophagy and ROS-mediated apoptosis are crucial for a cell's survival. This crosstalk and connection between autophagy and apoptosis could be a mechanism targeted by cancer therapies or used in combination therapies for highly resistant cancers.

=== Cancer therapy ===
The scheme of fabrication process and therapeutic mechanism of thermo-responsive (MSNs@CaO2-ICG)@LA NPs for synergistic CDT/PDT with H2O2/O2 self-supply and GSH depletion

Both ROS-elevating and ROS-eliminating strategies have been developed, with the former being predominantly used. Cancer cells with elevated ROS levels depend heavily on the antioxidant defense system. ROS-elevating drugs further increase cellular ROS stress levels, either by direct ROS generation (e.g. motexafin gadolinium, elesclomol) or by agents that abrogate the inherent antioxidant system, such as SOD inhibitors (e.g. ATN-224, 2-methoxyestradiol) and GSH inhibitors (e.g. PEITC, buthionine sulfoximine (BSO)). The result is an overall increase in endogenous ROS, which, when above a cellular tolerability threshold, may induce cell death. On the other hand, normal cells appear to have, under lower basal stress and reserve, a higher capacity to cope with additional ROS-generating insults than cancer cells do. Therefore, the elevation of ROS in all cells can be used to achieve the selective killing of cancer cells.

James Watson and others have proposed that lack of intracellular ROS due to a lack of physical exercise may contribute to the malignant progression of cancer, because spikes of ROS are needed to correctly fold proteins in the endoplasmic reticulum and low ROS levels may thus aspecifically hamper the formation of tumor suppressor proteins. Since physical exercise induces temporary spikes of ROS, this may explain why physical exercise is beneficial for cancer patient prognosis. Moreover, high inducers of ROS such as 2-deoxy-D-glucose and carbohydrate-based inducers of cellular stress induce cancer cell death more potently because they exploit the cancer cell's high avidity for sugars.

== See also ==
- Oxygen solubility
- Oxygen toxicity
- Reactive nitrogen species
- Reactive sulfur species
- Reactive carbonyl species
- Reactive oxygen species production in marine microalgae
