= Reactive oxygen species production in marine microalgae =

All living cells produce reactive oxygen species (ROS) as a byproduct of metabolism. ROS are reduced oxygen intermediates that include the superoxide radical (O_{2}^{−}) and the hydroxyl radical (OH•), as well as the non-radical species hydrogen peroxide (H_{2}O_{2}). These ROS are important in the normal functioning of cells, playing a role in signal transduction and the expression of transcription factors. However, when present in excess, ROS can cause damage to proteins, lipids and DNA by reacting with these biomolecules to modify or destroy their intended function. As an example, the occurrence of ROS have been linked to the aging process in humans, as well as several other diseases including Alzheimer's, rheumatoid arthritis, Parkinson's, and some cancers. Their potential for damage also makes reactive oxygen species useful in direct protection from invading pathogens, as a defense response to physical injury, and as a mechanism for stopping the spread of bacteria and viruses by inducing programmed cell death.

Reactive oxygen species are present in low concentrations in seawater and are produced primarily through the photolysis of organic and inorganic matter. However, the biological production of ROS, generated through algal photosynthesis and subsequently 'leaked' to the environment, can contribute significantly to concentrations in the water column. Although there is very little information on the biological generation of ROS in marine surface waters, several species of marine phytoplankton have recently been shown to release significant amounts of ROS into the environment. This ROS has the potential to harm nearby organisms, and, in fact, has been implicated as the cause of massive fish, bacteria, and protist mortalities.

== Chemical background ==
In sea water, ROS can be generated through abiotic as well as biotic processes, among which are the radiolysis and photolysis of water molecules and cellular respiration. According to a model proposed by Fan for the prediction of ROS in surface waters, the biochemistry mediated by phytoplankton may be just as important for the production of ROS as photochemistry. Biological ROS is often synthesized in mitochondrial membranes, as well as the endoplasmic reticulum of animals, plants, and some bacteria. In addition, chloroplasts and the organelles peroxisomes and glyoxysomes are also sites for the generation of ROS. The ROS most likely released to the environment are those produced at the cell surface as electrons get "leaked" from the respiratory chain and react with molecular oxygen, O_{2}. The products of this subsequent reduction of molecular oxygen are what are referred to as reactive oxygen species. Thus, the production of ROS is in direct proportion to the concentration of O_{2} in the system, with increases of O_{2} leading to higher production of ROS. There are three main reactive oxygen species: the superoxide anion (O_{2}^{−}), hydrogen peroxide (H_{2}O_{2}), and the hydroxyl radical (OH•). The superoxide anion is formed directly from the one-electron reduction of molecular oxygen. Hydrogen peroxide is then formed from the disproportionation of the superoxide anion. This reaction occurs very quickly in seawater. Next, the reduction of hydrogen peroxide yields the hydroxyl radical, H_{2}O_{2}↔2OH•, which can then get reduced to the hydroxyl ion and water. However, the presence of reactive oxygen species in marine systems is hard to detect and measure accurately, for a number of reasons. First, ROS concentrations are generally low (nanomoles) in seawater. Second, they may react with other hard to identify molecules that occur in low quantities, resulting in unknown products. Finally, they are (for the most part) transient intermediates, having lifetimes as little as microseconds.

=== Superoxide production ===
According to Blough & Zepp, superoxide is one of the hardest reactive oxygen species to quantify because it is present in low concentrations: 2×10^{−12} M in the open ocean and up to 2×10^{−10}M in coastal areas. The main sources of biological superoxide in the ocean come from the reduction of oxygen at the cell surface and metabolites released into the water. In marine systems, superoxide most often acts as a one-electron reductant, but it can also serve as an oxidant and may increase the normally slow oxidation rates of environmental compounds. Superoxide is very unstable, with between 50 and 80% of its concentration of anions spontaneously disproportionating to hydrogen peroxide. At its peak, this reaction occurs with a rate constant on the order of 2.2×10^{4} – 4.5×10^{5} L mol^{−1}sec^{−1} in seawater. The dismutation of superoxide to hydrogen peroxide can also be catalyzed by the antioxidant enzyme superoxide dismutase with a rate constant on the order of 2×10^{9} L mol^{−1}sec^{−1}. As a result of these fast acting processes, the steady state concentration of superoxide is very small. Since superoxide is also moderately reactive towards trace metals and dissolved organic matter, any remaining superoxide is thought to be removed from the water column through reactions with these species. As a result, the presence of superoxide in surface waters has been known to result in an increase of reduced iron. This, in turn, serves to enhance the availability of iron to phytoplankton whose growth is often limited by this key nutrient. As a charged radical species, superoxide is unlikely to significantly affect an organism's cellular function since it is not able to easily diffuse through the cell membrane. Instead, its potential toxicity lies in its ability to react with extracellular surface proteins or carbohydrates to inactivate their functions. Although its lifetime is fairly short (about 50 microseconds), superoxide has the potential to reach cell surfaces since it has a diffusion distance of about 320 nm.

=== Hydrogen peroxide production ===
The reduction product of superoxide is hydrogen peroxide, one of the most studied reactive oxygen species because it occurs in relatively high concentrations, is relatively stable, and is fairly easy to measure. It is thought that algal photosynthesis is one of the major modes of hydrogen peroxide production, while the production of H_{2}O_{2} by stressed organisms is a secondary source. In marine systems, hydrogen peroxide (H_{2}O_{2}) exists at concentrations of 10^{−8}-10^{−9} M in the photic zone, but has been found in double those concentrations in parts of the Atlantic Ocean. Its lifetime, ranging from hours to days in coastal waters, can be as long as 15 days in Antarctic seawater. H_{2}O_{2} is important in aquatic environments because it can oxidize dissolved organic matter and affect the redox chemistry of iron, copper, and manganese. Since hydrogen peroxide, as an uncharged molecule, diffuses easily across biological membranes it can directly damage cellular constituents (DNA and enzymes) by reacting with them and deactivating their functions. In addition, hydrogen peroxide reduces to the hydroxyl radical, the most reactive radical and the one with the greatest possibility for damage.

=== Hydroxyl radical production ===
Even though the superoxide and the hydrogen peroxide radicals are toxic in their own right, they become potentially more toxic when they interact to form the hydroxyl radical (OH•). This proceeds through the iron and copper catalyzed Haber–Weiss reaction: O_{2}^{−} + Fe^{3+} ↔ O_{2} + Fe^{2+} H_{2}O_{2} + Fe^{2+} ↔ Fe^{3+} + OH• + OH^{−}

Since iron and copper are present in coastal waters, the hydroxyl radical could be formed by reactions with either of the, and, in fact, their oxidation does result in significant sources of hydroxyl radicals in the ocean. The hydroxyl radical is the most unstable of the ROS (lifetime of 10^{−7}seconds), reacting with many inorganic and organic species in the surrounding environment at rates near the diffusion limit (rate constants of 10^{8} -10^{10} L mol^{−1} sec^{−1}). In seawater, the radical is removed as a result of reactions with bromide ions, while in fresh water it reacts principally with bicarbonate and carbonate ions. Because it has such a high reactivity, day time concentrations in surface waters of the hydroxyl radical are generally very low (10^{−19} to 10^{−17} M). The hydroxyl radical can oxidize membrane lipids and cause nucleic acids and proteins to denature. However, because the radical is so reactive, there is likely not enough time for transport to the cell surface (mean diffusion distance of 4.5 nm). Thus, direct effects to organisms of externally generated hydroxyl radicals are expected to be minimal. Indirectly, the hydroxyl radical can result in significant biogeochemical changes in marine systems by influencing the cycling of dissolved organic matter and trace metal speciation. Both intracellular and extracellular reactive oxygen species can be removed from the environment by antioxidants produced biologically as a defense mechanism. Many phytoplankton, for instance, have been found to have numerous superoxide-scavenging (superoxide dismutase) and hydrogen peroxide-scavenging enzymes (catalase, ascorbate peroxidase, and glutathione peroxidase). The antioxidant superoxide dismutase catalyses the formation of hydrogen peroxide from the superoxide anion through the following reaction: 2 O_{2}^{−} + 2H^{+} ↔ O_{2} + H_{2}O_{2}. Similarly, catalase increases the formation of water from hydrogen peroxide by catalyzing the reaction: 2H_{2}O_{2}↔ O_{2} + 2H_{2}O. As a result of this reaction, the hydroxyl radical is prevented from forming. In addition, the presence of large quantities of humics in the water can also act as antioxidants of ROS. However, certain ROS can inactivate certain enzymes. For instance, the superoxide anion is known to temporarily inhibit the function of catalase at high concentrations.

== Controls of ROS production in algae ==
Many algal species have been shown to not only produce reactive oxygen species under normal conditions but to increase production of these compounds under stressful situations. In particular, ROS levels have been shown to be influenced by cell size, cell density, growth stage, light intensity, temperature, and nutrient availability.

=== Cell size ===
Oda et al. found that differences in the production of ROS were due to the size of the cell. By comparing four species of flagellates, they showed that the larger species Ichatonella produced the most superoxide and hydrogen peroxide per cell than Heterosigma akashiwo, Olisthodiscus luteus, and Fibrocapsa japonica. In a comparison of 37 species of marine microalgae, including dinoflagellates, rhaphidophytes, and chlorophytes, Marshall et al. also found a direct relationship between cell size and the amount of superoxide produced. The largest cells, Chattonella marina, produced up to 100 times more superoxide than most other marine algae (see figure in). The authors suggest that since ROS is produced as a byproduct of metabolism, and larger cells are more metabolically active than smaller cells, it follows that larger cells should produce more ROS. Similarly, since photosynthesis also produces ROS, larger cells likely have a greater volume of chloroplasts and would be expected to produce more ROS than smaller cells.

=== Algal density ===
The production of ROS has also been shown to be dependent on algal cell density. Marshall et al. found that for Chattonella marina, higher concentrations of cells produced less superoxide per cell than those with a lower density. This may explain why some raphydophyte blooms are toxic at low concentration and non-toxic in heavy blooms. Tang & Gobler also found that cell density was inversely related to ROS production for the alga Cochlodinium polykrikoides. They found, in addition, that increases of ROS production were also related to the growth phase of algae. In particular, algae in exponential growth were more toxic than those in the stationary or late exponential phase. Many other algal species (Heterosigma akashiwo, Chattonella marina, and Chattonella antiqua) have also been shown to produce the highest amounts of ROS during the exponential phase of growth. Oda et al. suggest this is due to actively growing cells having higher photosynthesis and metabolic rates. Resting stage cells of Chattonella antiqua have been shown to generate less superoxide than their motile counterparts.

=== Light levels ===
Since superoxide is produced through the auto-oxidation of an electron acceptor in photosystem I during photosynthesis, one would expect a positive relationship between light levels and algal ROS production. This is indeed what has been shown: in the diatom Thallasia weissflogii, an increase in light intensity caused an increase in the production of both superoxide and hydrogen peroxide. Similarly, in the flagellates Chattonella marina, Prorocentrum minimum, and Cochlodinium polykrikoides, decreases in light levels resulted in decreases in superoxide production, with higher levels produced during the day. However, because many studies have found ROS production to be relatively high even in the dark, metabolic pathways other than photosynthesis are likely more important for production. For instance, Liu et al. found that ROS production was regulated by iron concentration and pH. From this evidence they suggest that ROS production is most likely due to a plasma membrane enzyme system dependent on iron availability. Similarly, in Heterosigma akashiwo, the depletion of iron and an increase in temperature, not light intensity, resulted in enhanced production of ROS. Liu et al. found the same relationship with temperature.

== Functions of algal produced ROS ==
The active release of reactive oxygen species from cells has a variety of purposes, including a means to deter predators, or a chemical defense for the incapacitation of competitors. In addition, ROS may be involved in cell signaling, as well as the oxidation or reduction of necessary or toxic metals.

=== Chemical defense ===
It is not surprising that ROS production may be a form of chemical defense against predators, since at low levels it can damage DNA and at high levels lead to cell necrosis. One of the most common mechanisms of cellular injury is the reaction of ROS with lipids, which can disrupt enzyme activity and ATP production, and lead to apoptosis. Reactions of ROS with proteins can modify amino acids, fragment peptide chains, alter electrical charges, and ultimately inactivate an enzyme's function. In DNA, deletions, mutations, and other lethal genetic effects may result from reactions with ROS. Reactive oxygen species are especially inexpensive to produce as defense chemicals, simply because they are not composed of metabolically costly elements such as carbon, nitrogen, or phosphate. Reactive oxygen species produced by phytoplankton have been linked to deaths of fish, shellfish, and protists, as well as shown to reduce the viability and growth of bacteria. In addition, a study by Marshall et al. showed that four algal species used as bivalve feed produced significantly lower concentrations of superoxide, suggesting that ROS production by other algal species may be a way to decrease grazing by bivalves. The most direct evidence for ROS as a defense mechanism is the fact that many icthyotoxic algae produce greater concentrations of ROS than nonichthyotoxic strains.

=== Enhancement of toxic exudates ===
It is possible that ROS may not be the actual toxic substance, but may in fact work to make other exudates more toxic by oxidizing them. For instance, ROS from Chattonella marina have been shown to enhance the toxic effects of fatty acid eicosapentaenoic acid (EPA) on exposed fishes. Similarly, free-fatty acids released from diatom biofilms as products of ROS oxidation of EPA are known to be toxic to zooplankters. In addition, Fontana et al. suggested that the interaction of ROS and diatom exudates (such as fatty acid hydroperoxides) are responsible for inhibiting embryonic development and causing larval abnormalities in copepods. Finally, ROS oxidation of algal polyunsaturated fatty acids have also been shown to deter grazers.

=== Competitive advantage ===
In addition to impacting predator-prey interactions, the production of ROS may also help an alga get an advantage in the competition for resources against other algae, be a way to prevent fouling bacteria, and act as a signaling mechanism between cells. ROS can inhibit photosynthesis in algae Thus an alga that is more tolerant of ROS than another may produce and release it as a means of decreasing the other species competitive ability. In addition, Chattonella marina, the most well studied raphydophyte for ROS production, may produce a boundary of ROS that deters other marine microalgae from using nutrients in its vicinity. Similarly, this boundary could also be a way to discourage bacteria fouling, since the production of ROS is known to inhibit growth and bioluminescent ability in the bacteria Vibrio alginolyticus and Vibrio fischeri, respectively. Lastly, Marshall et al. showed that Chattonella marina cells were able to change their rate of superoxide production in as little as one hour when in different cell densities, increasing the rate from 1.4 to 7.8 times the original. They suggest that this quick response in altering rates of production may be a form of chemical signaling between cells that works to provide information about cell density.

=== Reduction of metals ===
ROS may be useful in the oxidation or reduction of necessary or toxic metals. Since iron is necessary for phytoplankton growth, the auto-reduction of reactive oxygen species may be a way for algae to get usable iron from free or organically bound ferric iron. For instance, Cakman et al. showed that ROS may increase the amount of iron available through extracellular ferric reduction. It is thought that the high reducing power of this reaction is maintained through the electron-rich superoxide ion. In several studies on the ROS production of Heterosigma akashiwo, hydrogen peroxide production was found to be inversely proportional to the concentration of iron available. In addition, Cornish and Page in 1998 found that phytoplankton produce more ROS when there are lower levels of extracellular iron. They suggested that when intracellular iron is limiting, the phytoplankton respond by producing more ROS as a way to increase the reducing potential around the cell and thus be better able to reduce that iron to a usable form. Similarly, lower ROS production would suggest that the intracellular iron is at sufficiently high levels for cellular function.
