= ETHE1 =

Protein-coding gene in the species Homo sapiens

Available structures
PDB	Ortholog search: PDBe RCSB
PDB	List of PDB id codes 4CHL

Identifiers
- Aliases: ETHE1, HSCO, YF13H12, persulfide dioxygenase, ETHE1 persulfide dioxygenase
- External IDs: OMIM: 608451; MGI: 1913321; HomoloGene: 8622; GeneCards: ETHE1; OMA:ETHE1 - orthologs

Gene location (Human)
Chr.	Chromosome 19 (human)
Band	19q13.31	Start	43,506,719 bp
Band	19q13.31	End	43,527,230 bp

Gene location (Mouse)
Chr.	Chromosome 7 (mouse)
Band	7|7 A3	Start	24,286,968 bp
Band	7|7 A3	End	24,308,350 bp
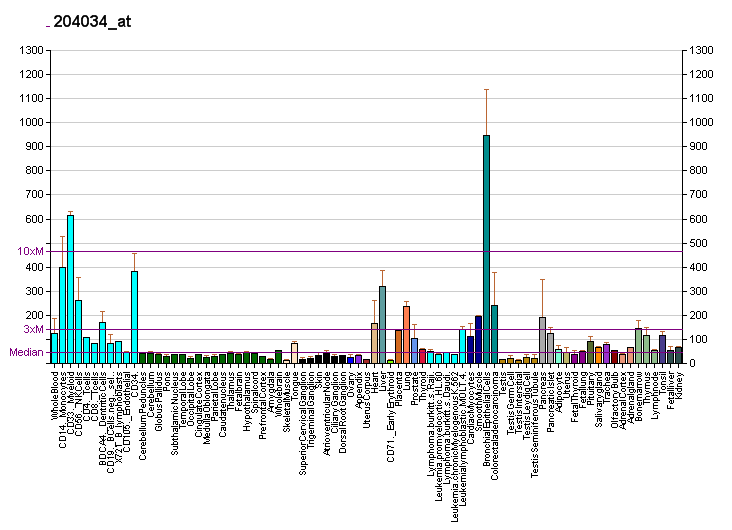
RNA expression pattern
Bgee	Human / Mouse (ortholog); Top expressed in: mucosa of transverse colon; mucosa of ileum; rectum; mucosa of sigmoid colon; stromal cell of endometrium; granulocyte; mucosa of pharynx; duodenum; minor salivary glands; body of stomach / Top expressed in: left colon; gastric mucosa; pyloric antrum; mucous cell of stomach; epithelium of stomach; right kidney; left lobe of liver; granulocyte; human kidney; proximal tubule; More reference expression data
BioGPS	More reference expression data
Gene ontology
Molecular function	iron ion binding; oxidoreductase activity; sulfur dioxygenase activity; dioxygenase activity; metal ion binding; hydrolase activity, acting on ester bonds
Cellular component	cytoplasm; mitochondrial matrix; mitochondrion; nucleus; nucleoplasm
Biological process	hydrogen sulfide metabolic process; sulfide oxidation, using sulfide:quinone oxidoreductase; glutathione metabolic process
Sources:Amigo / QuickGO
Orthologs
Species	Human	Mouse
Entrez	23474	66071
Ensembl	ENSG00000105755	ENSMUSG00000064254
UniProt	O95571	Q9DCM0
RefSeq (mRNA)	NM_014297; NM_001320867; NM_001320868; NM_001320869	NM_023154; NM_001364014
RefSeq (protein)	NP_001307796; NP_001307797; NP_001307798; NP_055112	NP_075643; NP_001350943
Location (UCSC)	Chr 19: 43.51 – 43.53 Mb	Chr 7: 24.29 – 24.31 Mb
PubMed search
- Wikidata
View/Edit Human	View/Edit Mouse

Protein ETHE1, mitochondrial, also known as "ethylmalonic encephalopathy 1 protein" and "persulfide dioxygenase", is a protein that in humans is encoded by the ETHE1 gene located on chromosome 19.

== Structure ==
The human ETHE1 gene consists of 7 exons and encodes for a protein that is approximately 27 kDa in size.

== Function ==
This gene encodes a protein that is expressed mainly in the gastrointestinal tract, but also in several other tissues such as the liver and the thyroid.

The ETHE1 protein is thought to localize primarily to the mitochondrial matrix and functions as a sulfur dioxygenase. Sulfur deoxygenates are proteins that function in sulfur metabolism. The ETHE1 protein is thought to catalyze the following reaction:

sulfur + O_{2} + H_{2}O $\rightleftharpoons$ sulfite + 2 H^{+} (overall reaction)
(1a) glutathione + sulfur $\rightleftharpoons$ S-sulfanylglutathione (glutathione hydropersulfide, spontaneous reaction)
(1b) S-sulfanylglutathione + O_{2} + H_{2}O $\rightleftharpoons$ glutathione + sulfite + 2 H^{+}

and requires iron and possibly glutathione as cofactors. The physiological substrate of ETHE1 is thought to be glutathione hydropersulfide, an intermediate metabolite involved in hydrogen sulfide degradation.

== Clinical significance ==
Mutations in ETHE1 gene are thought to cause ethylmalonic encephalopathy, a rare inborn error of metabolism. Patients carrying ETHE1 mutations have been found to exhibit lower activity of ETHE1 and affinity for the ETHE1 substrate. Mouse models of Ethe1 genetic ablation likewise exhibited reduced sulfide dioxygenase catabolism and cranial features of ethylmalonic encephalopathy. Decrease in sulfide dioxygenase activity results in abnormal catabolism of hydrogen sulfide, a gas-phase signaling molecule in the central nervous system, whose accumulation is thought to inhibit cytochrome c oxidase activity in the respiratory chain of the mitochondrion. However, other metabolic pathways may also be involved that could exert a modulatory effect on hydrogen sulfide toxicity.

== Interactions ==
ETHE1 has been shown to interact with RELA.
