= Alpha effect =

Effect in chemistry

Figure 1. Normal and α-nucleophiles

The alpha effect refers to the increased nucleophilicity of an atom due to the presence of an adjacent (alpha) atom with lone pair electrons. This first atom does not necessarily exhibit increased basicity compared with a similar atom without an adjacent electron-donating atom, resulting in a deviation from the classical Brønsted-type reactivity-basicity relationship. In other words, the alpha effect refers to nucleophiles presenting higher nucleophilicity than the predicted value obtained from the Brønsted basicity. The representative examples would be high nucleophilicities of hydroperoxide (HO_{2}^{−}) and hydrazine (N_{2}H_{4}). The effect is now well established with numerous examples and became an important concept in mechanistic chemistry and biochemistry. However, the origin of the effect is still controversial without a clear winner.

== Background ==
=== Experiment ===
The effect was first observed by Jencks and Carriuolo in 1960 in a series of chemical kinetics experiments involving the reaction of the ester p-nitrophenyl acetate with a range of nucleophiles. Regular nucleophiles such as the fluoride anion, aniline, pyridine, ethylene diamine and the phenolate ion were found to have pseudo first order reaction rates corresponding to their basicity as measured by their pK_{a}. Other nucleophiles however reacted much faster than expected based on this criterion alone. These include hydrazine, hydroxylamine, the hypochlorite ion and the hydroperoxide anion.

=== α-effect ===
In 1962, Edwards and Pearson (the latter of HSAB theory) introduced the phrase alpha effect for this anomaly. He offered the suggestion that the effect was caused by a transition state (TS) stabilization effect: on entering the TS the free electron pair on the nucleophile moves away from the nucleus, causing a partial positive charge which can be stabilized by an adjacent lone pair as for instance happens in any carbocation.

== Theory ==
Over the years, many additional theories have been put forward attempting to explain the effect.

=== Ground state destabilization ===
The ground state destabilization theory proposes that the electron-electron repulsion between the alpha lone-pair and nucleophilic electron pair destabilize each other by electronic repulsion (filled–filled orbital interaction) thereby decreasing the activation barrier by increasing the ground state energy and making it more reactive. This explains the higher reactivity of α-nucleophiles, however, this electronic mechanism should also increase the basicity and, therefore, cannot fully explain the α-effect.

=== Transition state stabilization ===
Many explanations fall into this category. First, the secondary orbital interactions theory emphasized that electron-donating heteroatom in the α-position could contribute to increased orbital interaction with the substrate, which stabilizes the transition state (TS) and gives greater reactivity. Second, the electron transfer (ET) mechanism presents that the heteroatom in the α position could stabilize the S_{N}2 transition state which has a single electron transfer (free radical) character. Other driving forces including the tighter transition state and higher polarizability of α-nucleophiles, involvement of intramolecular catalysis also plays a role. Another in silico study did find a correlation between the alpha effect and the so-called deformation energy, which is the electronic energy required to bring the two reactants together in the transition state.

=== Thermodynamic product stability ===
This explanation proposes that a stable product could contribute to the alpha effect, however, this factor could not be the sole factor.

=== Solvent-induced effects ===
The alpha effect is also dependent on solvent but not in a predictable way: it can increase or decrease with solvent mix composition or even go through a maximum. At least in some cases, the alpha effect has been observed to vanish if the reaction is conducted in the gas phase, leading some to conclude that it is primarily a solvation effect. However, this explanation has limitations since similar alpha effects could be found in different solvent systems and also because the solvation affects both the basicity and the nucleophilicity of the nucleophile.

=== Pauli repulsion and HOMO-LUMO overlap ===
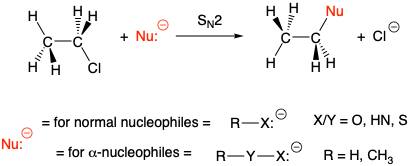
Figure 2. S_{N}2 reaction with the substrate, C_{2}H_{5}Cl

In the recent article published in 2021, Hansen and Vermeeren proposed the two requirements for an α-nucleophile to present the α-effect. The two proposed requirements were (1) minimization of steric Pauli repulsion via small HOMO lobes on the nucleophilic center and (2) small HOMO-LUMO orbital energy gap that ensures orbital overlap with the substrate. It was proposed that both of these two requirements should be fulfilled to have an α-effect, otherwise, the nucleophiles would show no or inverse α-effect (Figure 2). In this recent work, the six normal nucleophiles (HO^{−}, CH_{3}O^{−}, H_{2}N^{−}, CH_{3}HN^{−}, CH_{3}S^{−}, HS^{−}) followed the Brønsted-type correlation. α-nucleophiles with O, HN, and S in the α position were classified into three groups according to their degree and pattern of deviation from the Brønsted-type correlation in S_{N}2 reactions with the substrate, ethyl chloride (C_{2}H_{5}Cl) (Figure 3).

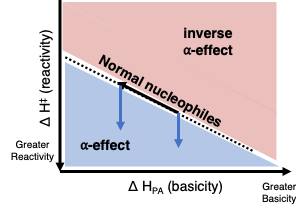
Figure 3. Plot of reactivity and basicity shows the (inverse)-α-effect

First, the α-nucleophiles with downward deviation, in other words, higher reactivity shown considering the basicity or lower basicity given the reactivity, were grouped as nucleophiles showing α-effect. The second group had nucleophiles with small or no deviation from the line plotted by six normal nucleophiles. Lastly, the third group had nucleophiles showing inverse α-effect, meaning that they are above the plotted line or have less reactivity considering their high basicity. Relative density functional theory, activation strain model, energy decomposition analysis, and Kohn-Sham molecular orbital analysis the three groups had a distinction in HOMO lobes and HOMO-LUMO gaps.

To elaborate on the first requirement, the electronegative heteroatom reduces the electron density of the atom that attacks the nucleophile making the HOMO lobe smaller. This minimizes the Pauli repulsion between the substrate and the nucleophile. Nonetheless, these small HOMO lobes don't mean less orbital interaction than the parent normal nucleophile. This is because α-nucleophiles showing the α-effect have smaller HOMO(nucleophile)-LUMO(substrate) gap, in other words, high HOMO energy level that allows more orbital interaction.

Examples of α-nucleophiles with α-effects are shown in Figure 4. The α-nucleophiles have smaller HOMO lobes than the parent normal nucleophile.

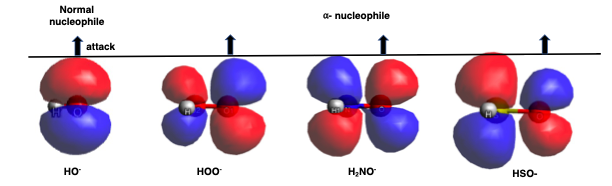
Figure 4. Normal and α-nucleophiles (smaller HOMO lobes)

Examples of α-nucleophiles with α-effect and inverse α-effect are shown in Figure 5.

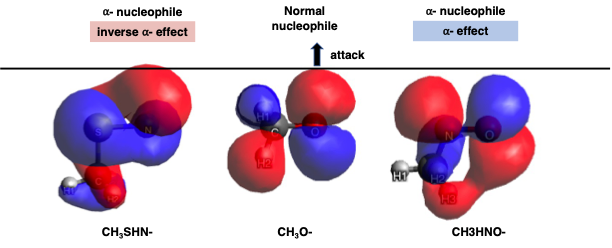
Figure 5. α-effect and inverse α-effect

== See also ==
- SN2 reaction
- Nucleophile
