= Reactivity (chemistry) =

Proclivity of a chemical substance to undergo a reaction

In chemistry, reactivity is the impulse for which a chemical substance undergoes a chemical reaction, either by itself or with other materials, with an overall release of energy.

Reactivity refers to:

- the chemical reactions of a single substance,
- the chemical reactions of two or more substances that interact with each other,
- the systematic study of sets of reactions of these two kinds,
- methodology that applies to the study of reactivity of chemicals of all kinds,
- experimental methods that are used to observe these processes, and
- theories to predict and to account for these processes.

The chemical reactivity of a single substance (reactant) covers its behavior in which it:

- decomposes,
- forms new substances by addition of atoms from another reactant or reactants, and
- interacts with two or more other reactants to form two or more products.

The chemical reactivity of a substance can refer to the variety of circumstances (conditions that include temperature, pressure, presence of catalysts) in which it reacts, in combination with the:

- variety of substances with which it reacts,
- equilibrium point of the reaction (i.e., the extent to which all of it reacts), and
- rate of the reaction.

The term reactivity is related to the concepts of chemical stability and chemical compatibility.

== An alternative point of view ==
'Reactivity' is a somewhat vague concept in chemistry. It appears to embody both thermodynamic factors and kinetic factors (i.e., whether or not a substance reacts, and how fast it reacts). Both factors are actually distinct, and both commonly depend on temperature. For example, it is commonly asserted that the reactivity of alkali metals (Na, K, etc.) increases down the group in the periodic table, or that hydrogen's reactivity is evidenced by its reaction with oxygen. In fact, the rate of reaction of alkali metals (as evidenced by their reaction with water for example) is a function not only of position within the group but also of particle size. Hydrogen does not react with oxygen—even though the equilibrium constant is very large—unless a flame initiates the radical reaction, which leads to an explosion.

Restriction of the term to refer to reaction rates leads to a more consistent view. Reactivity then refers to the rate at which a chemical substance tends to undergo a chemical reaction in time. In pure compounds, reactivity is regulated by the physical properties of the sample. For instance, grinding a sample to a higher specific surface area increases its reactivity. In impure compounds, the reactivity is also affected by the inclusion of contaminants. In crystalline compounds, the crystalline form can also affect reactivity. However, in all cases, reactivity is primarily due to the sub-atomic properties of the compound.

Although it is commonplace to make statements that "substance X is reactive," each substance reacts with its own set of reagents. For example, the statement that "sodium metal is reactive" suggests that sodium reacts with many common reagents (including pure oxygen, chlorine, hydrochloric acid, and water), either at room temperature or when using a Bunsen burner.

The concept of stability should not be confused with reactivity. For example, an isolated molecule of an electronically excited state of the oxygen molecule spontaneously emits light after a statistically defined period. The half-life of such a species is another manifestation of its stability, but its reactivity can only be ascertained via its reactions with other species.

== Causes of reactivity ==
The second meaning of reactivity (i.e., whether or not a substance reacts) can be rationalized at the atomic and molecular level using older and simpler valence bond theory and also atomic and molecular orbital theory. Thermodynamically, a chemical reaction occurs because the products (taken as a group) are at a lower free energy than the reactants; the lower energy state is referred to as the "more stable state." Quantum chemistry provides the most in-depth and exact understanding of the reason this occurs. Generally, electrons exist in orbitals that are the result of solving the Schrödinger equation for specific situations.

All things (values of the n and m_{l} quantum numbers) being equal, the order of stability of electrons in a system from least to greatest is;

- unpaired, and with no other electrons in similar orbitals,
- unpaired, and with all degenerate orbitals half-filled,
- (and the most stable is) a filled set of orbitals.

To achieve one of these orders of stability, an atom reacts with another atom to stabilize both. For example, a lone hydrogen atom has a single electron in its 1s orbital. It becomes significantly more stable (as much as 100 kilocalories per mole, or 420 kilojoules per mole) when reacting to form H_{2}.

It is for this same reason that carbon almost always forms four bonds. Its ground-state valence configuration is 2s^{2} 2p^{2}, half-filled. However, the activation energy to go from half-filled to fully-filled p orbitals is negligible, and as such, carbon forms them almost instantaneously. Meanwhile, the process releases a significant amount of energy (exothermic). This four equal bond configuration is called sp^{3} hybridization.

The above three paragraphs rationalize, albeit very generally, the reactions of some common species, particularly atoms. One approach to generalize the above is the activation strain model of chemical reactivity which provides a causal relationship between, the reactants' rigidity and their electronic structure, and the height of the reaction barrier.

The rate of any given reaction:

$$\ce{Reactants -> Products}$$

is governed by the rate law:

$$\text{Rate}=k\cdot [\ce A]$$

where the rate is the change in the molar concentration in one second in the rate-determining step of the reaction (the slowest step), [A] is the product of the molar concentration of all the reactants raised to the correct order (known as the reaction order), and k is the reaction constant, which is constant for one given set of circumstances (generally temperature and pressure) and independent of concentration. The reactivity of a compound is directly proportional to both the value of k and the rate. For instance, if

$$\ce{A + B -> C + D}$$,

then

$$\text{Rate}=k\cdot[\ce A]^n \cdot[\ce B]^m$$

where n is the reaction order of A, m is the reaction order of B, n + m is the reaction order of the full reaction, and k is the reaction constant.

== See also ==
- Thermodynamic activity
- Catalysis
- Reactivity series
- Michaelis–Menten kinetics
- Organic chemistry
- Chemical kinetics
- Transition state theory
- Marcus theory
- Klopman–Salem equation
