= Persulfide =

Class of chemical compounds

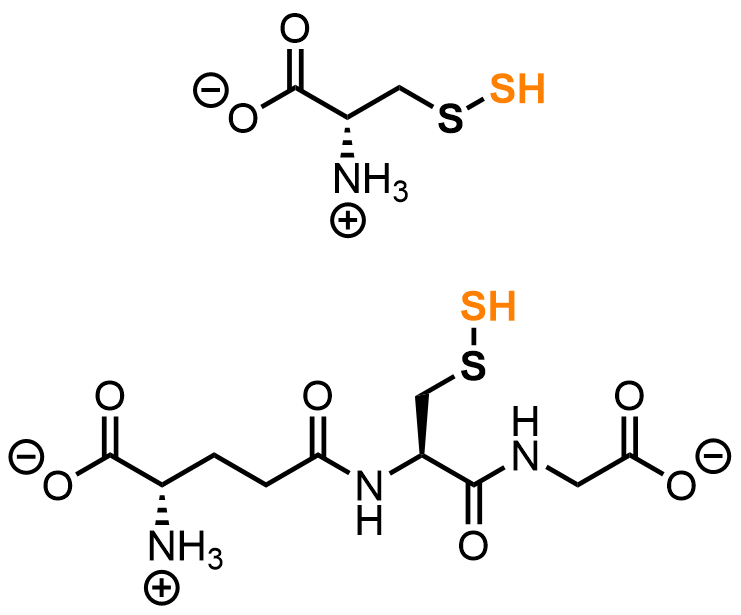
Cysteine hydropersulfide (top) and glutathione hydropersulfide (bottom), the two most physiologically relevant persulfide species. The additional sulfanyl group is marked in orange.

In chemistry, hydropersulfide refers to the functional group R-S-S-H. The anionic form of a hydropersulfide is a persulfide, analogous to the nomenclature for hydroperoxides. Persulfides are intermediates in the biosynthesis of iron-sulfur proteins and are invoked as precursors to hydrogen sulfide, a biological signaling molecule. Hydropersulfides are thought to mediate many of the antioxidant signaling functions once ascribed purely to hydrogen sulfide via modification of protein cysteine (Cys) residues in a process referred to as persulfidation. Hydropersulfides are prototypical reactive sulfur species.

== Nomenclature ==
The nomenclature used for organosulfur compounds is often non-systematic. The current literature (in English) has standardized the use of hydropersulfide and persulfide. Hydropersulfides may also be described as S-sulfanyl derivatives of their corresponding thiols (i.e. S-sulfanylcysteine for cysteine hydropersulfide). In older literature, persulfides are called hydrodisulfides or hydridodisulfides to further avoid confusion with disulfides with the grouping R-S-S-R, by emphasizing the presence of an H at one end of a disulfide bond. Older literature has also referred to hydropersulfides as "perthiols". Likewise, the formation of protein hydropersulfides from protein thiols in the context of signaling was once referred to as "S-sulfhydration", a term which is now deprecated in favor of "S-persulfidation" or "persulfidation" in the current literature.

== Chemical properties ==
Hydropersulfides, as with catenated sulfur species in general, are thermodynamically unstable with respect to loss of elemental sulfur:

RSSH → RSH + 1/8 S_{8}

The S-H bond is both more acidic and more fragile than in thiols. Hydropersulfides are on average between 1 and 3 pK_{a} units more acidic than their corresponding thiols, occupying a range of 4.6 to 6.3 for the biologically relevant thiols. Thus, persulfides exist predominantly in the ionized form at neutral pH. However, the self-reactivity of hydropersulfides makes reliabie quantification of their pK_{a} values difficult.

The bond dissociation energy of a typical hydropersulfide is 22 kcal/mol weaker than a typical thiol, and the lower pK_{a} of about 6.2 for persulfides compared to 7.5 for thiols. This effect is attributed to the stability of the RSS· radical.

== Structure and reactivity ==
The structure of trityl hydropersulfide has been determined by X-ray crystallography. The S-S bond length is 204 picometers and the C-S-S-H dihedral angle is 82°. These parameters are unexceptional. (C_{6}H_{5})_{3}CSSH behaves as a source of sulfur, illustrated by its reaction with triphenylphosphine to give triphenylphosphine sulfide and triphenylmethanethiol:

(C_{6}H_{5})_{3}CSSH + P(C_{6}H_{5})_{3} → (C_{6}H_{5})_{3}CSH + SP(C_{6}H_{5})_{3}

Regioselectivity for nucleophilic attack at the two sulfurs of a hydropersulfide depends on the substituents at sulfur. For the reaction of a thiol nucleophile with a hydropersulfide, attack at the terminal sulfur atom results in a net transfer of a sulfhydryl group from the hydropersulfide to the attacking thiol, a reaction known as transpersulfidation. Attack at the inner sulfur atom results in the release of hydrosulfide anion (in equilibrium at neutral pH with hydrogen sulfide) and formation of new disulfide.

R^{1}SSH + R^{2}SH $\rightleftharpoons$ R^{1}SH + R^{2}SSH transpersulfidation

R^{1}SSH + R^{2}SH $\rightleftharpoons$ R^{1}SSR^{2} + H_{2}S disulfide formation

Both processes are operative in solution. However, transpersulfidation is slightly kinetically favored due to a lower steric barrier. Electron-withdrawing groups on the hydropersulfide stabilize developing negative charge on the inner sulfur atom of the transpersulfidation transition state, further biasing reactivity towards transpersulfidation. The disulfide formation pathway is most competitive when the hydropersulfide is sterically unhindered.

Transpersulfidation from low-molecular weight hydropersulfides onto protein cysteine residues is thought to be the dominant mechanism by which proteins are persulfidated. The instability of hydropersulfides in solution has motivated the design of hydropersulfide donor molecules for biochemical research, which typically operate via transpersulfidation reactivity.

Owing to their increased acidity, hydropersulfides exist as persulfide anions at physiological pH moreso than the corresponding thiols exist as thiolates. The role of the α-effect on this nucleophilicity of persulfides is debated. Protonation of hydropersulfides enhances the electrophilicity of the S-S bond.

Under neutral to mildly acidic conditions, where both the electrophilic hydropersulfide and nucleophilic persulfide anion protonation states are present, hydropersulfides reversibly disproportionate to give a complex equilibrium of hydrogen sulfide, persulfides, trisulfides, tetrasulfides and higher-order polysulfides, and elemental sulfur:

R^{1}S^{–} + R^{2}SSSH $\rightleftharpoons$ R^{1}SSH + R^{2}SS^{–} $\rightleftharpoons$ R^{1}SSSR^{2} + HS^{–}

R^{1}SSSR^{2} + R^{3}SS^{–} $\rightleftharpoons$ R^{3}SSSSR^{2} + R^{1}S^{–} → → R^{x}S(S)_{n}SR^{y}

Note that the above equations do not encompass all possible sulfur exchange chemistry and recombination products that could be formed. Trisulfides represent a local thermodynamic minimum for persulfides in dilute solution but are subject to sulfur catenation reactivity. Hydropolysulfides [RS(S)_{n}SH] may also be formed and are expected to possess similar properties to hydropersulfides.

The unique instability of persulfides complicates their detection in biological samples, which is typically performed via alkylation of persulfides with electrophiles such as iodoacetamide derivatives and Michael acceptors such as N-ethylmaleimide.

Because of the stability of the perthiyl radical (RSS·), hydropersulfides have been found to be exceptional physiological hydrogen atom transfer reagents comparable to alpha-tocopherol, the canonical lipid membrane-soluble single-electron antioxidant. Hydropersulfides have been found to rapidly inhibit lipid peroxidation chain reactions via conversion of lipid peroxyl radicals to lipid hydroperoxides.

== Biosynthetic and physiological roles ==
Hydropersulfides may be synthesized directly from hydrogen sulfide via reaction with sulfenic acids, a biologically relevant but short-lived oxoform of cysteine:

RSOH + H_{2}S → RSSH + H_{2}O

Formation of biological hydropersulfide species from hydrogen sulfide and a thiol is a net oxidation process and thus must necessarily occur via some manner of oxidation, even if no obvious oxidizing agent is present.

Cysteine (Cys) hydropersulfide may be generated from cystine via the transsulfuration pathway enzymes cystathionine β-synthase (CBS) and cystathionine γ-lyase (CSE, also referred to as cystathionase). The mitochondrial cysteine aminoacyl-tRNA synthetase CARS2 synthesizes cysteine hydropersulfide from cysteine and allows for co-translational incorporation of hydropersulfides into nascent proteins. The enzyme 3-mercaptopyruvate sulfurtransferase catabolizes 3-mercaptopyruvate to produce an active site Cys hydropersulfide, which may undergo transpersulfidation reactions with thiols or be reduced to release H_{2}S. Sulfide:quinone oxidoreductase (SQOR) oxidizes H_{2}S to form hydropersulfides in the presence of a thiol acceptor such as glutathione. The thiosulfate sulfurtransferase rhodanese interconverts hydropersulfides and thiosulfate.

Cysteine desulfurases also generate active site Cys hydropersulfides, which are used as sulfur sources for the biosynthesis of sulfur-containing cofactors such as 4-thiouridine and thiamine, as well as iron-sulfur cluster assembly in both bacteria and mammalian cells. Mitochondrial iron-sulfur cluster assembly requires transpersulfidation from the Cys desulfurase NFS1 to the iron-sulfur cluster assembly protein ISCU, mediated by the accessory protein frataxin (FXN); loss of effective transpersulfidation from NFS1 via deleterious mutations in FXN results in Friedrich's ataxia.

Persulfides have been invoked as intermediates in the biodegradation of carbon disulfide.

Hydropersulfides are typically thought to be antioxidants due to activation of Nrf2 signaling via persulfidation of Keap1, the inhibitor protein of Nrf2. Hydropersulfides also inhibit ferroptosis via depletion of oxidizing radical species. Hydropersulfides have been shown to act as physiological protecting groups for protein Cys residues against overoxidation, as they may be sacrificially oxidized to thiosulfonic acids and then cleaved by thioredoxins to regenerate the original protein. However, persulfidation may also act in a pro-oxidant capacity by promoting disulfide formation, which is traditionally considered an oxidative modification in biology.

Persulfides are catabolized in the mitochondria as part of H_{2}S catabolism. Rhodanese may reversibly utilize GSSH as a sulfur source to produce thiosulfate. GSSH is irreversibly degraded by the persulfide dioxygenase ETHE1 to GSH and sulfite, which is further oxidized and excreted. Cysteine hydropersulfide may be directly effluxed from mammalian cells via the cystine/glutamate antiporter SLC7A11.

== See also ==
- Hydrogen persulfide – an inorganic hydropersulfide
- Polysulfane – a related class of inorganic catenated sulfur species
- Polysulfide
- Reactive sulfur species
