= Persulfidation =

Modifying a protein amino acid by adding sulfur

Persulfidation (referred to in older literature as sulfhydration) is a type of post-translational modification of proteins involving addition of a sulfur molecule onto a reactive thiol (-SH) group of a cysteine residue, forming a species known as a hydropersulfide (-SSH). Persulfidation occurs in plants, animals, and throughout all kingdoms. It is a redox mechanism that regulates diverse biological processes in hydrogen sulfide (H_{2}S) signaling by regulating protein functions and/or subcellular localizations. Protein persulfidation is thought to be major mechanism by which H_{2}S acts as an antioxidant, in addition to the bioorganic chemistry of persulfides themselves.

Hydropersulfides are unstable and react readily with thiols, making identification and quantification difficult. Typical chemistry for detecting protein persulfidation takes advantage of the nucleophilicity of the persulfide anion, which is the major protonation state at physiological pH: alkylating agents such as iodoacetamide derivatives and N-ethylmaleimide have traditionally been used to trap persulfides as disulfides for analysis. However, disulfides β to olefins and carbonyl groups, which may be formed by these trapping reagents, are also susceptible to elemental sulfur extrusion to form thioethers.

Selective detection of persulfides on proteins may be accomplished using a "tag-switch" protocol:

HS-Protein-S-S^{–} + 2 Tag1 → Tag1-S-Protein-S-S-Tag1

Tag1-S-Protein-S-S-Tag-1 + Tag2 → Tag1-S-Protein-S-Tag2 + Tag1-S^{–}

All of the nucleophilic cysteine modifications (cysteine, cysteine sulfenate, cysteine persulfide) are functionalized with an electrophilic "tag" (Tag1) while disulfides and higher oxidation states such as sulfinate and sulfonate are not modified. Only the reaction of a persulfide with an alkylating agent produces an electrophilic species (a disulfide), which can react with a weak nucleophile conjugated to a second tag (Tag2) to "switch" the tag on the trapped persulfide.

This modification can be reversed back into a thiol by exogenous chemical reducing agents such as dithiothreitol (DTT) or TCEP, biological reducing agents such as glutathione, and proteins such as thioredoxin or glutaredoxin.
