= Reactive carbonyl species =

Type of molecule

3-Deoxyglucosone, a common RCS, rapidly reacts with protein amino groups to form AGEs.

Reactive carbonyl species (RCS) are molecules with highly reactive carbonyl groups, and often known for their damaging effects on proteins, nucleic acids, and lipids. They are often generated as metabolic products. Important RCSs include 3-deoxyglucosone, glyoxal, and methylglyoxal. RCSs react with amines and thiol groups leading to advanced glycation endproducts (AGEs). AGEs are indicators of diabetes.

Reactive aldehyde species (RASP), such as malondialdehyde and 4-hydroxynonenal, are a subset of RCS that are implicated in a variety of human diseases.

RCSs are involved in many important reactions, including here lipid peroxidation and carbohydrate reduction. Their interaction with specific proteins by forming covalent adducts is critical in understanding the RCSs role in diabetes and cardiovascular diseases.

== Overview of reactive carbonyl species generation ==
Reactive carbonyl species (RCS) are molecules that can be derived both exogenously and endogenously. Exogenously RCSs can enter the cell through the exposure and products of industrial pollutants, food additives, and even cigarette smoke. This includes molecules such as glyoxal, formaldehyde, and acrolein. Endogenously, RCS is a byproduct of biochemical enzymatic and nonenzymatic reactions, such as lipid and amino acid oxidation.

In lipid peroxidation, it is the breakdown of the polyunsaturated fatty acids’ free radical chain that synthesizes many RCS molecules, such as malondialdehyde (MDA), which is a highly reactive molecule that marks oxidative stress. Low-density lipoproteins can be covalently modified by RCS, which results in their oxidized form. The modified LDL can be recognized by scavenger receptors and lead to the formation of foam cells.

RCSs are involved in the reduction of carbohydrates. For example, carbohydrates, such as MGO and 3-DG are noted as side products of some enzymatic pathways, such as glycolysis. Methylglyoxal (MGO) is a highly reactive compound falling under the reactive carbonyl species category. Glycolysis results in production of MGO. As part of a reaction of the triosephosphate isomerase enzyme, enediol phosphate can decompose in Pi (inorganic phosphate) and MGO.

== RCS reactions with proteins ==
Through Schiff base formations and Michael addition reactions, carbonyl containing compounds form covalent adducts with proteins. The RCS carbonyl electrophile targets a nucleophilic group present in amino acid residues. In the case of Schiff base reactions, the reaction occurs between the carbonyl and the primary amine group through a dehydration reaction. This results in secondary reactions that proceed in producing further arrangements, structures, to cross-link proteins and form complex structures. In Michael addition, the α,β-unsaturated RCS carbonyl group reacts with nucleophilic thiol sulfur, amino, and imidazole nitrogen. These reactions result in the stable covalent adducts that have a role in protein stability, structure, and function. The specificity of these modifications differs greatly on different kinds of RCS and proteins. Factors that are accounted for are the carbon chain length, degree of unsaturation, polarity, solubility, and reactivity of target amino acid residues.

== Disease relevance – cardiovascular disease and neurotoxicity ==
RCS's role as highly reactive intermediates results in damaging and disrupting normal cellular function as researched in diseases such as diabetes, cardiovascular disease, and neurodegeneration. Control and diabetic rats' hearts were used to assess the relative amount of adducts formed by RCS with key calcium-handling proteins in heart muscle, such as RyR2 and SERCA2a. These proteins are key to proper heart function. From the RCS tested, MGO, GO, 4-HNE, and MDA, RyR2 had 2x more MGO and GO adducts. SERCA2a had 2x more MGO adducts. No 4-HNE or MDA adducts were detected. The findings suggest that MGO and GO are part of the RCS that contribute to key modification in diabetic conditions’ cardiac proteins.

Conjugated α,β-unsaturated carbonyl RCS adduct formation mechanism has been linked to neurotoxicity. RCS form covalent adducts with neuronal proteins. This depends on the reactivity of the RCS electrophile to the thiol groups found in neurons. Type-2 alkenes, classified as soft electrophiles, undergo Michael addition reactions with the thiol group of cysteine residues in proteins. When the cysteine residues are modified due to RCS activity, there is a disruption of the normal cellular function. Cysteine residues are found in ion channels and synaptic proteins. Their modification can result in disruptions of the synaptic signaling and neurotransmitter release. These disturbances are directly related to the development of neurotoxicity.

== See also ==
- Reactive oxygen species
- Reactive sulfur species
- Reactive nitrogen species
