= Activation strain model =

Mathematical model for modelling chemical reactions

The activation strain model, also referred to as the distortion/interaction model, is a computational tool for modeling and understanding the potential energy curves of a chemical reaction as a function of reaction coordinate (ζ), as portrayed in reaction coordinate diagrams. The activation strain model decomposes these energy curves into 2 terms: the strain of the reactant molecules as they undergo a distortion and the interaction between these reactant molecules. An important aspect of this type of analysis compared to others is that it describes the energetics of the reaction in terms of the original reactant molecules, and describes their distortion and interaction using intuitive models such as molecular orbital theory, which are capable of using most quantum chemical programs. Such a model allows for the calculation of transition state energies, and hence the activation energy, of a particular reaction mechanism, allowing the model to be used as a predictive tool for describing competitive mechanisms and relative preference for certain pathways. In chemistry literature, the activation strain model has been used for modeling bimolecular reactions like S_{N}2 and E2 reactions, transition metal mediated C-H bond activation, 1,3-dipolar cycloaddition reactions, among others.

== Theory ==
The activation strain model was originally proposed and has been extensively developed by Bickelhaupt and coworkers. This model breaks the potential energy curve as a function of reaction coordinate, $\zeta$, of a reaction into 2 components as shown in equation 1: the energy due to straining the original reactant molecules ($\Delta E _\mathrm{strain}$) and the energy due to interaction between reactant molecules ($\Delta E _\mathrm{int}$). The strain term $\Delta E _\mathrm{strain}$ is usually destabilizing as it represents the distortion of a molecule from the equilibrium geometry. The interaction term, $\Delta E _\mathrm{int}$, is generally stabilizing as it represents the electronic interactions of reactants that typically drive the reaction. The interaction energy is further decomposed based on an energy decomposition scheme from an approach by Morokuma and the Transition State Method from by Ziegler and Rauk. This decomposition breaks the interaction energy into terms that are easily processed within the framework of Kohn-Sham molecular orbital model. These terms relate to the electrostatic interactions, steric repulsion, orbital interactions, and dispersion forces as shown in equation 2.

$\mathrm{Equation\ 1} \colon\ \Delta E(\zeta)=\Delta E_\mathrm{strain}+ \Delta E_\mathrm{int}$

$\mathrm{Equation\ 2} \colon\ \Delta E_\mathrm{int}=\Delta V_\mathrm{elst.}+\Delta E_\mathrm{pauli}+\Delta E_\mathrm{oi}+\Delta E_\mathrm{disp}$

The electrostatic interaction, $\Delta V _\mathrm{elst.}$, is the classical repulsion and attraction between the nuclei and electron densities of the approaching reactant molecules. The Pauli repulsion term, $\Delta E _\mathrm{pauli}$, relates to the interaction between the filled orbitals of reactant molecules. In other words, it describes steric repulsion between approaching reactants. The orbital interaction, $\Delta E _\mathrm{oi}$, describes bond formation, HOMO-LUMO interactions, and polarization. Further, this term is well complimented by group theory and MO theory as a way to describe interaction between orbitals of the correct symmetry. The last term, $\Delta E _\mathrm{disp}$, relates to dispersion forces between the reactants.

The transition states, defined as local maxima of potential energy surface, are found where equation 3 is satisfied. At this point along the reaction coordinate, as long as the strain and interaction energies at ζ = 0 is set to zero, the transition state energy ($\Delta E (\zeta_\mathrm{TS})$) is the activation energy ($\Delta E ^\ddagger$) of the reaction. The activation energy can then be defined as the sum of the activation strain ($\Delta E ^\ddagger_\mathrm{strain}$) and the TS interaction energy ($\Delta E ^\ddagger _\mathrm{int}$) as shown in equation 4.

$\mathrm{Equation \ 3}\colon \ {d \Delta E (\zeta) \over d \zeta}={d \Delta E_\mathrm{strain} (\zeta) \over d \zeta} + {d \Delta E_\mathrm{int} (\zeta) \over d \zeta} = 0$

$\mathrm{Equation \ 4}\colon \ \Delta E ^\ddagger = \Delta E _\mathrm{strain} ^\ddagger + \Delta E _\mathrm{int} ^ \ddagger$

== Select applications ==
The bimolecular elimination (E2) and substitution (S_{N}2) reactions are often in competition with each other because of mechanistic similarities, mainly that both benefit from a good leaving group and that the E2 reaction uses strong bases, which are often good nucleophiles for an S_{N}2 reaction. Bickelhaupt et al. used the activation strain model to analyze this competition between the two reactions in acidic and basic media using the 4 representative reactions below. Reactions [1] and [2] represent the E2 and S_{N}2 reactions, respectively, in basic conditions while reactions [3] and [4] represent the E2 and S_{N}2 reactions in acidic conditions.

$\ce{[1] \ OH^- \ +\ CH_3CH_2OH\ -> H_2O\ {+}\ CH_2CH_2\ {+} \ OH^-}$

$\ce{[2] \ OH^- \ +\ CH_3CH_2OH\ -> CH_3CH_2OH \ + \ OH^-}$

$\ce{[3] \ H_2O \ + \ CH3CH2OH_2+ -> H_3O+\ +\ CH2CH2 \ + \ H2O}$

$\ce{[4] \ H2O \ + \ CH3CH2OH2+-> CH3CH2OH2+ \ + \ H2O}$

Initial calculations show that, in basic media, the transition state energy ΔE^{‡} of the E2 pathway is lower while acidic conditions favor the S_{N}2. Closer observation of the interaction and strain energies show that, for the E2 mechanism, upon shifting from acidic to basic media, the strain energy becomes more destabilizing, yet the interaction energy becomes more even more stabilizing, making it the driving force for the preference of the E2 pathway in basic conditions.

To rationalize this increase in stabilizing interaction upon shifting to basic conditions, it is useful to represent the interaction energy in terms of molecular orbital theory. The figure below shows the lowest unoccupied molecular orbitals (LUMO)s of ethanol (basic conditions) and protonated ethanol (acidic conditions), which can be visualized as a combinations of the fragment $\ce{*CH_3}$ radical and either the $\ce{*CH2OH}$ (basic conditions) or the $\ce{*CH2OH2+}$ (acidic conditions) radical. Upon protonation of the $\ce{*CH2OH}$ fragment, these orbitals are lowered in energy, resulting in the overall LUMO for each molecule having different parentage. This change in parentage in the linear combination of atomic orbitals results in the LUMO of $\ce{CH3CH2OH2+}$ having bonding character between β-carbon and the hydrogen atom abstracted in the E2 pathway while the LUMO of $\ce{CH3CH2OH}$ has antibonding character along this bond.

In either the S_{N}2 or the E2 pathway, the HOMO of the nucleophile/base will be donating electron density into this LUMO. As the LUMO for $\ce{CH3CH2OH2+}$ has bonding character along the C(β)-H bond, putting electrons into this orbital should result in strengthening of this bond, dissuading its abstraction as necessary in the E2 reaction. The opposite goes for the LUMO of $\ce{CH3CH2OH}$, as donation into the orbital that is antibonding with respect to this bond will weaken the C(β)-H bond and allow it abstraction in the E2 reaction. This relatively intuitive comparison within MO theory shows how the increase in stabilizing interaction for the E2 mechanism arises when switching from acidic to basic conditions.

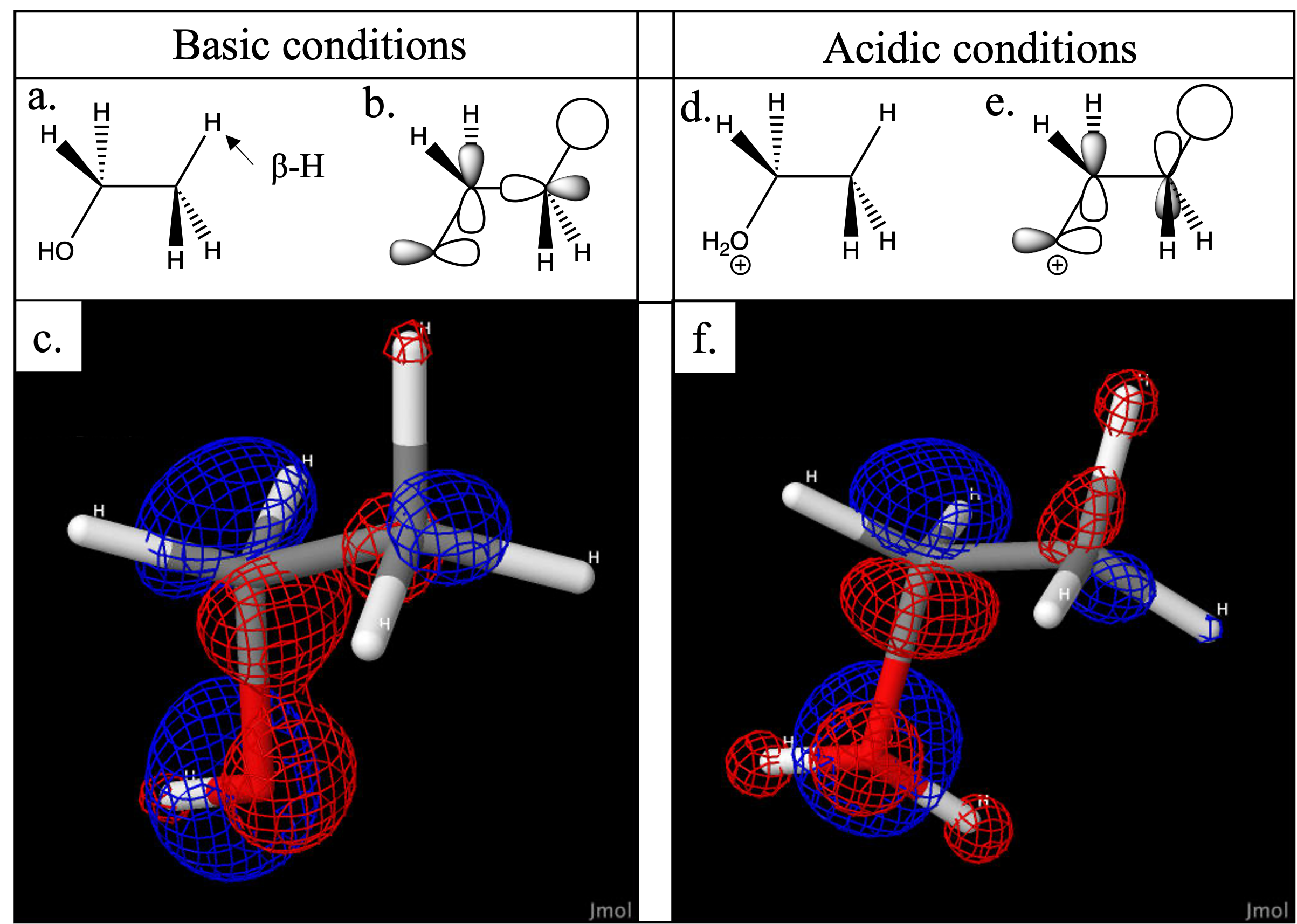
The lowest unoccupied molecular orbitals (LUMOs) of ethanol (basic conditions) and protonated ethanol (acidic conditions). (a.) and (d.) show the structure of the molecules. (b.) and (e.) show the major contributions from the linear combination of atomic orbitals. (c.) and (f.) show the LUMOs as determined by DFT calculations of the geometry optimized structures. Figure re-created from literature.

== Single point calculations ==
An issue in the interpretation of interaction (∆E_{int}) and strain (∆E_{strain}) curves arises when only single points along the reaction coordinate are considered. Such issues become apparent when two model reactions are considered, which have identical strain energy ∆E_{strain} curves that become more destabilizing along the reaction coordinate but have different interaction energy curves. If one of the reactions has a more stabilizing interaction energy curve with greater curvature, the transition state will be reached sooner along the reaction coordinate in order to satisfy the condition in equation 3, while a reaction with a less stabilizing interaction curve will reach the transition state later in the reaction coordinate with a higher transition state energy.

If only the transition states are observed, it would appear that the transition state of the second representative reaction would have a higher energy due to the higher strain energy at the respective transition states. However, if one considers the entire curves for both of the reactions, it would become clear that the higher transition state energy of the second reaction is due to the less stabilizing interaction energy at all points along the reaction coordinate, while they have identical strain energy curves.
