= Peroxynitrite =

Ion

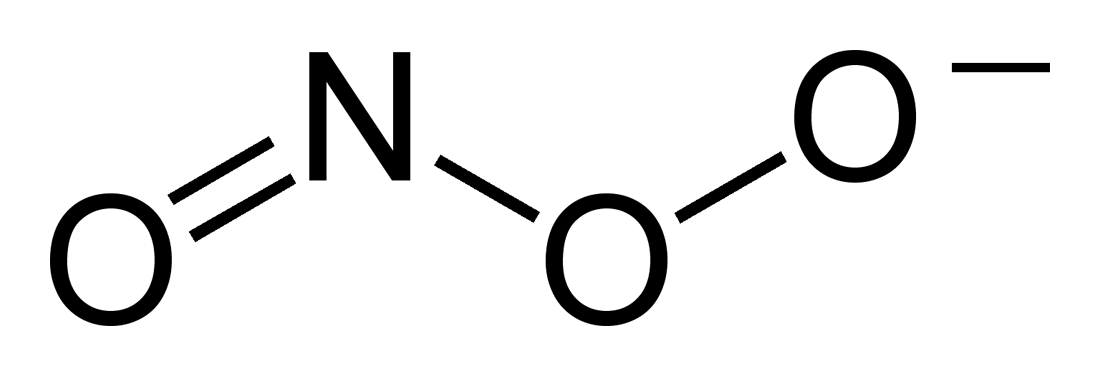
- Chemical structure of the peroxynitrite anion

Names
- IUPAC name Oxido nitrite

Identifiers
CAS Number	19059-14-4
3D model (JSmol)	Interactive image
ChEBI	CHEBI:25941
ChemSpider	94607
Gmelin Reference	674445
KEGG	C16845
PubChem CID	104806
UNII	UR67NH4U77
CompTox Dashboard (EPA)	DTXSID10172540
- InChI: InChI=1S/HNO3/c2-1-4-3/h3H/p-1 Key: CMFNMSMUKZHDEY-UHFFFAOYSA-M
- SMILES: N(=O)O[O-]

Properties
Chemical formula	NO_{3}^{−}
Molar mass	62.005 g·mol^{−1}
- Except where otherwise noted, data are given for materials in their standard state (at 25 °C [77 °F], 100 kPa). Infobox references

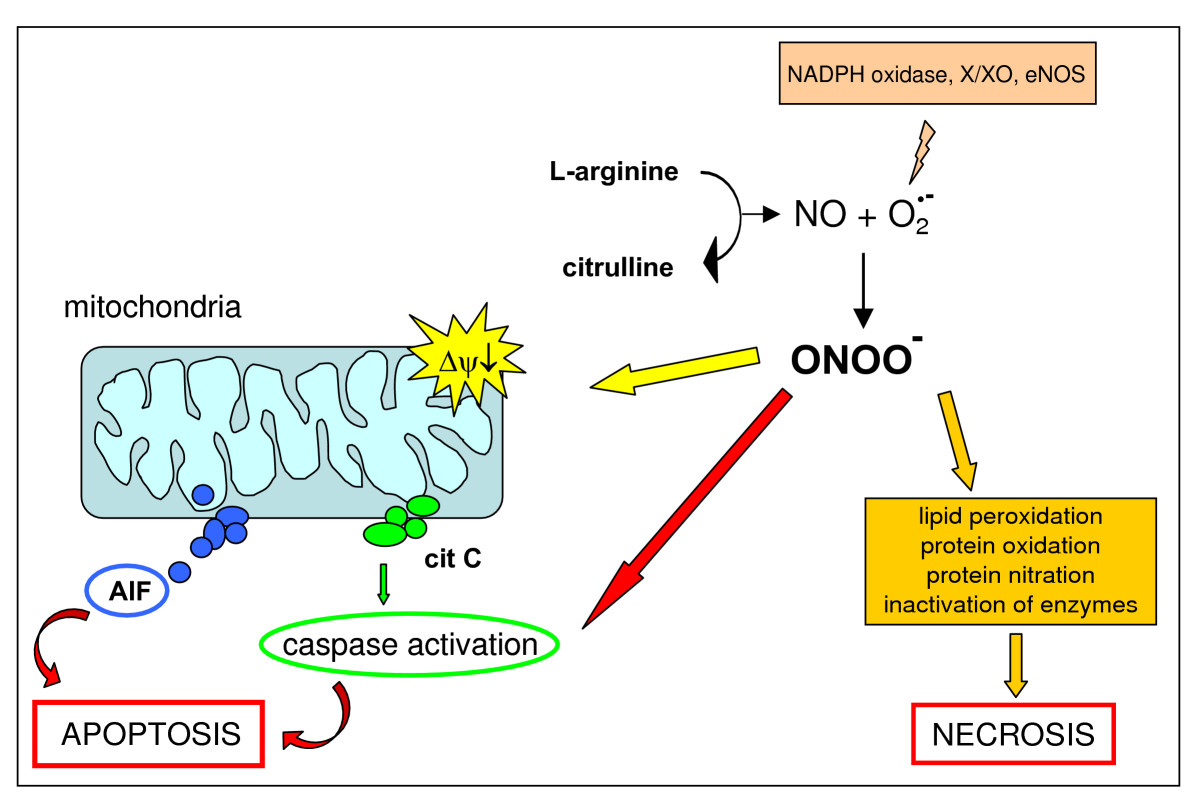
Reactions of peroxynitrite leading to either apoptotic or necrotic cell death

Peroxynitrite (sometimes called peroxonitrite) is an ion with the formula ONOO^{−}. It is a structural isomer of nitrate, NO^{−}_{3}. Peroxynitrite is a potent reactive nitrogen species and is highly cytotoxic.

== Preparation ==
Peroxynitrite can be prepared by the reaction of superoxide with nitric oxide:

NO + O^{−}_{2} → NO(O_{2})^{−}

It is prepared by the reaction of hydrogen peroxide with nitrite:

H_{2}O_{2} + NO^{−}_{2} → ONOO^{−} + H_{2}O

Its presence is indicated by the absorbance at 302 nm (pH 12, ε_{302} = 1670 M^{−1} cm^{−1}).

== Reactions ==
Peroxynitrite is weakly basic with a pK_{a} of ~6.8.

It is reactive toward DNA and proteins.

ONOO^{−} reacts nucleophilically with carbon dioxide. In vivo, the concentration of carbon dioxide is about 1 mM, and its reaction with ONOO^{−} occurs quickly. Thus, under physiological conditions, the reaction of ONOO^{−} with carbon dioxide to form nitrosoperoxycarbonate (ONOOCO^{−}_{2}) is by far the predominant pathway for ONOO^{−}. ONOOCO^{−}_{2} homolyzes to form carbonate radical and nitrogen dioxide, again as a pair of caged radicals. Approximately 66% of the time, these two radicals recombine to form carbon dioxide and nitrate. The other 33% of the time, these two radicals escape the solvent cage and become free radicals. It is these radicals (carbonate radical and nitrogen dioxide) that are believed to cause peroxynitrite-related cellular damage.

== Peroxynitrous acid ==
Its conjugate acid is peroxynitrous acid, which is highly reactive; by contrast, peroxynitrite is stable in basic solutions.

== See also ==
- Nitrotyrosine
- Reactive nitrogen species
