= Iron(II) sulfide =

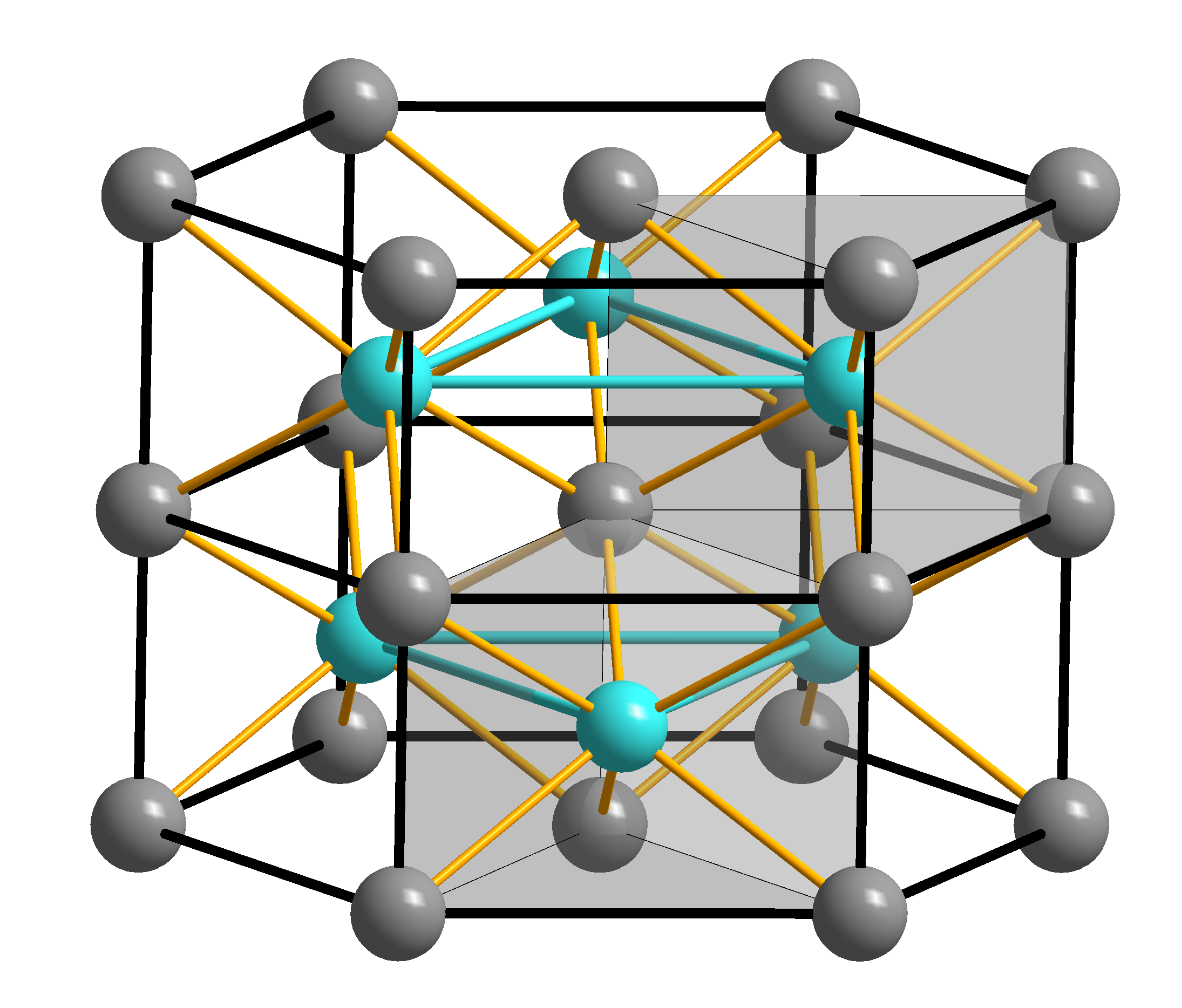

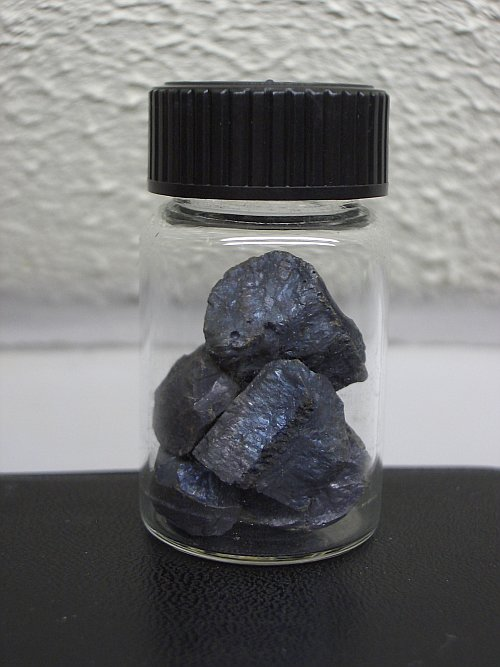
- Sample of iron(II) sulfide

Names
- Other names Iron sulfide, ferrous sulfide, black iron sulfide, protosulphuret of iron

Identifiers
CAS Number	1317-37-9
3D model (JSmol)	Interactive image
ChemSpider	8466211
ECHA InfoCard	100.013.881
PubChem CID	10290742
UNII	TH5J4TUX6S
CompTox Dashboard (EPA)	DTXSID5061665
- InChI: InChI=1S/Fe.S/q+2;-2 Key: GNVXPFBEZCSHQZ-UHFFFAOYSA-N; InChI=1/Fe.S/q+2;-2 Key: GNVXPFBEZCSHQZ-UHFFFAOYAC
- SMILES: [Fe+2].[S-2]

Properties
Chemical formula	FeS
Molar mass	87.910 g/mol
Appearance	Grey, sometimes in lumps or powder
Density	4.84 g/cm^{3}
Melting point	1,194 °C (2,181 °F; 1,467 K)
Solubility in water	negligible (insoluble)
Solubility	reacts in acid
Magnetic susceptibility (χ)	+1074·10^{−6} cm^{3}/mol

Hazards
- Occupational safety and health (OHS/OSH)
Main hazards	Source of hydrogen sulfide, can be pyrophoric
NFPA 704 (fire diamond)	1 2 2
Autoignition temperature	variable

Related compounds
Other anions	Iron(II) oxide Iron(II) selenide Iron(II) telluride
Other cations	Manganese(II) sulfide Cobalt(II) sulfide
Related Iron sulfides	Iron(III) sulfide
- Except where otherwise noted, data are given for materials in their standard state (at 25 °C [77 °F], 100 kPa). verify (what is ?) Infobox references

Iron(II) sulfide or ferrous sulfide (Br.E. sulphide) is one of a family of chemical compounds and minerals with the approximate formula FeS. Iron sulfides are often iron-deficient non-stoichiometric. All are black, water-insoluble solids.

== Preparation and structure ==
FeS can be obtained by the heating of iron and sulfur:

Fe + S → FeS

FeS adopts the nickel arsenide structure, featuring octahedral Fe centers and trigonal prismatic sulfide sites.

== Reactions ==
Iron sulfide reacts with hydrochloric acid, releasing hydrogen sulfide:

FeS + 2 HCl → FeCl_{2} + H_{2}S

FeS + H_{2}SO_{4} → FeSO_{4} + H_{2}S

In moist air, iron sulfides oxidize to hydrated ferrous sulfate.

== Biology and biogeochemistry ==
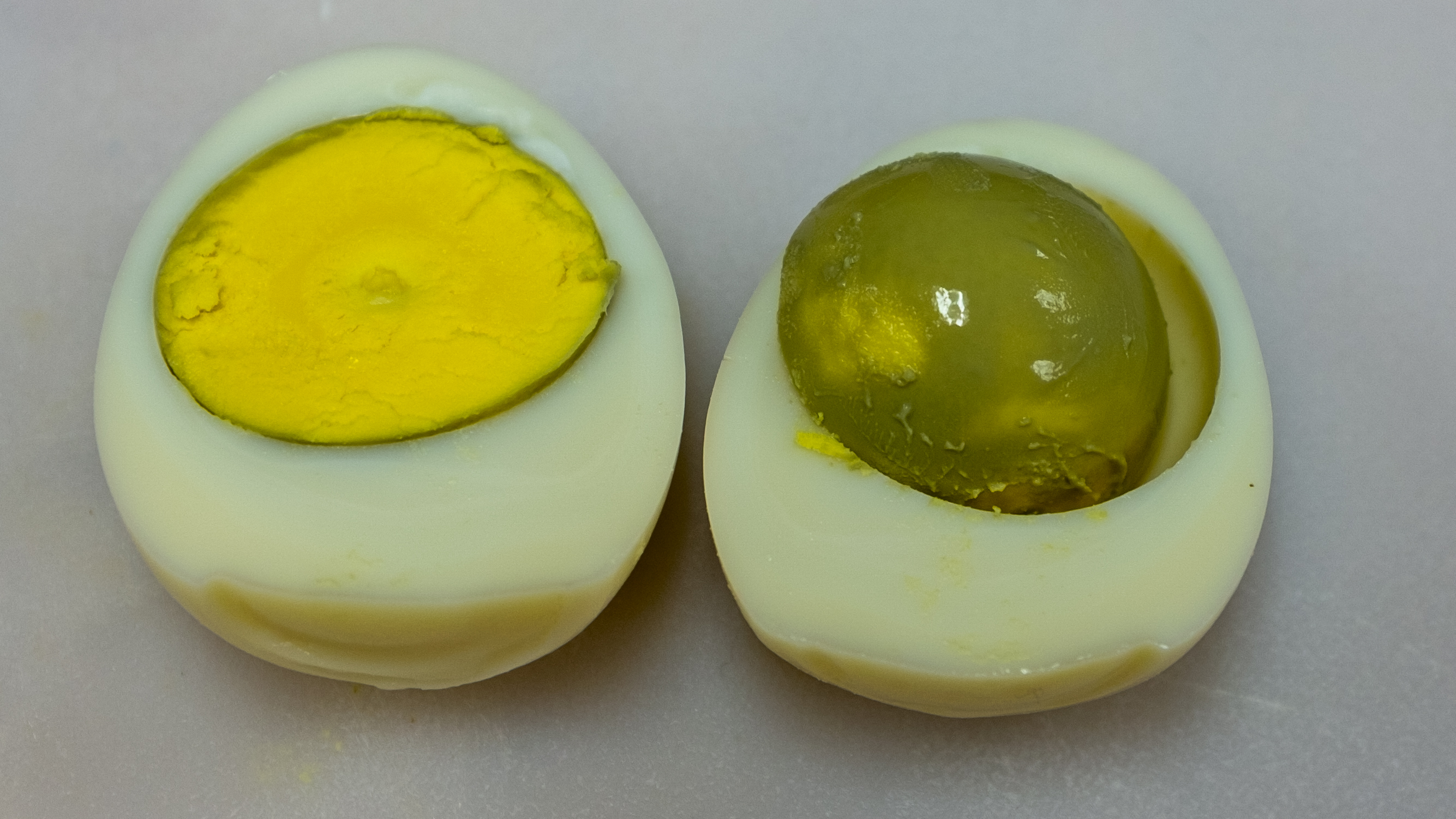
An overcooked hard-boiled egg, showing the distinctive green coating on the yolk caused by the presence of iron(II) sulfide

Iron sulfides occur widely in nature in the form of iron–sulfur proteins.

As organic matter decays under low-oxygen (or hypoxic) conditions such as in swamps or dead zones of lakes and oceans, sulfate-reducing bacteria reduce various sulfates present in the water, producing hydrogen sulfide. Some of the hydrogen sulfide will react with metal ions in the water or solid to produce iron or metal sulfides, which are not water-soluble. These metal sulfides, such as iron(II) sulfide, are often black or brown, leading to the color of sludge.

Pyrrhotite is a waste product of the Desulfovibrio bacteria, a sulfate reducing bacteria.

When eggs are cooked for a long time, the yolk's surface may turn green. This color change is due to iron(II) sulfide, which forms as iron from the yolk reacts with hydrogen sulfide released from the egg white by the heat. This reaction occurs more rapidly in older eggs as the whites are more alkaline.

The presence of ferrous sulfide as a visible black precipitate in the growth medium peptone iron agar can be used to distinguish between microorganisms that produce the cysteine metabolizing enzyme cysteine desulfhydrase and those that do not. Peptone iron agar contains the amino acid cysteine and a chemical indicator, ferric citrate. The degradation of cysteine releases hydrogen sulfide gas that reacts with the ferric citrate to produce ferrous sulfide.

== See also ==
- Iron sulfide
- Troilite
- Pyrite
- Iron-sulfur world theory
