= Polyketide synthase =

Family of multi-domain enzymes that produce polyketides

Polyketide synthases (PKSs) are a family of multi-domain enzymes or enzyme complexes that produce polyketides, a large class of secondary metabolites, in bacteria, fungi, plants, and a few animal lineages. The biosyntheses of polyketides share striking similarities with fatty acid biosynthesis.

The PKS genes for a certain polyketide are usually organized in one operon or in gene clusters. Type I and type II PKSs form either large modular protein complexes or dissociable molecular assemblies; type III PKSs exist as smaller homodimeric proteins.

== Classification ==
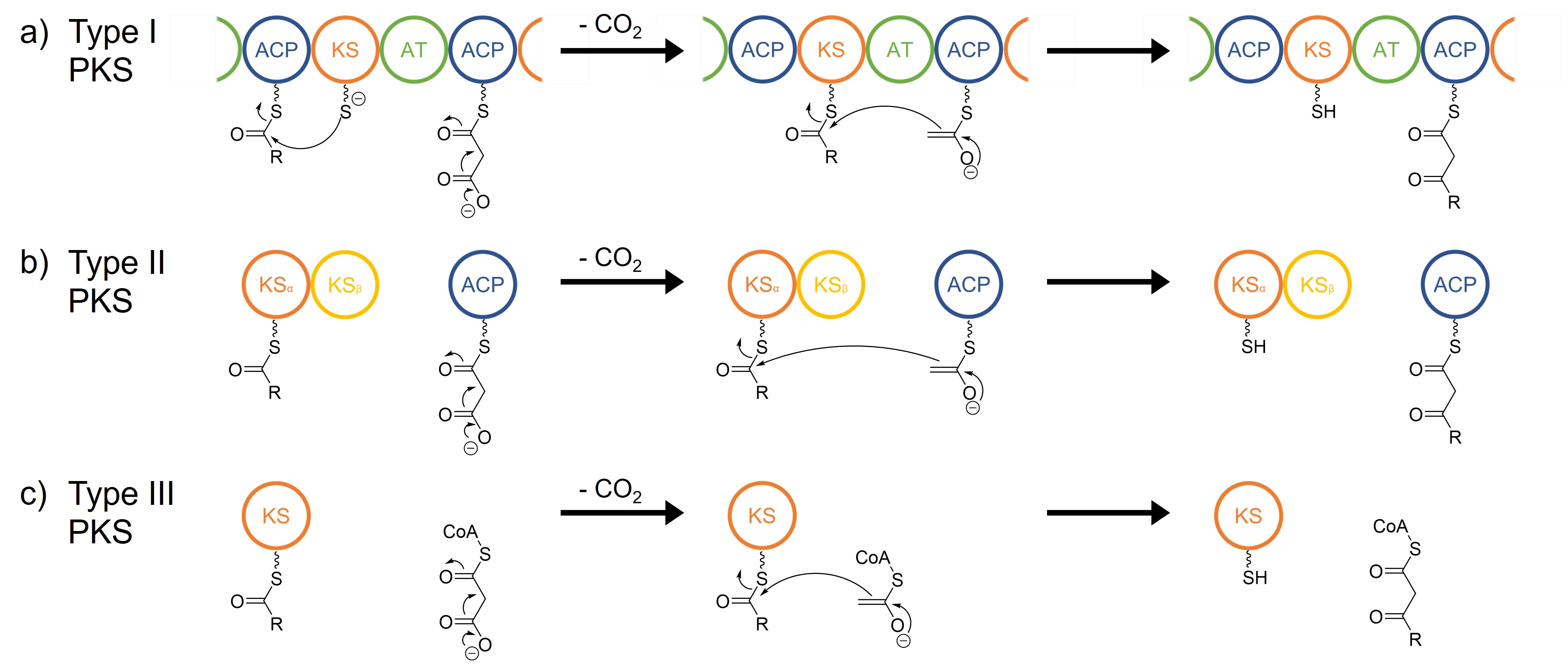
Reaction mechanisms of type I, II and III PKSs. Decarboxylation of malonyl unit followed by thio-Claisen condensation. a) (cis-AT) type I PKS with acyl carrier protein (ACP), keto synthase (KS) and acyl transferase (AT) domains covalently bound to another . b) Type II PKS with KSα-KSβ heterodimer and ACP as separate proteins. c) ACP-independent Type III PKS.

PKSs can be classified into three types:

Type I PKSs
Large, complex protein structures with multiple modules which in turn consist of several domains that are usually covalently connected to each other and fulfill different catalytic steps. The minimal composition of a type I PKS module consists of an acyltransferase (AT) domain, which is responsible for choosing the building block to be used, a keto synthase (KS) domain, which catalyzes the C-C bond formation and an acyl carrier protein (ACP) domain, also known as thiolation domain. The latter contains a conserved Ser residue, post-translationally modified with a phosphopantetheine at the end of which the polyketide chain is covalently bound during biosynthesis as a thioester. Moreover, multiple other optional domains can also exist within a module like ketoreductase or dehydratase domains which alter the default 1,3-dicarbonyl functionality of the installed ketide by sequential reduction to an alcohol and double bond, respectively. These domains work together like an assembly line. This type of type I PKSs is also referred to as cis-acyltransferase polyketide synthases (cis-AT PKSs). In contrast to that, so called trans-AT PKSs evolved independently and lack AT domains in their modules. This activity is provided by free-standing AT domains instead. Moreover, they often contain uncommon domains with unique catalytic activities.
Type II PKSs
Behave very similarly to type I PKS but with one key difference: Instead of one large megaenzyme, type II PKSs are separate, monofunctional enzymes. The smallest possible type II PKS consists of an ACP, as well as two heterodimeric KS units (KSα, which catalyzes the C-C bond formation and KSβ, also known as 'chain length factor' — CLF, since it can determine the carbon chain length), which fulfill a similar function as the AT, KS and ACP domains in type I PKSs, even though type II PKSs are lacking a separate AT domain. Additionally, type II PKSs often work iteratively where multiple chain elongation steps are carried out by the same enzyme, similar to type III PKSs.
Type III PKSs
Small homodimers of 40 kDa proteins that combine all the activities from the essential type I and II PKS domains. However, in contrast to type I and II PKSs they do not require an ACP-bound substrate. Instead, they can use a free acyl-CoA substrate for chain elongation. Moreover, type III PKSs contain a Cys-His-Asn catalytic triad in their active center, with the cysteine residue acting as the attacking nucleophile, whereas type I and II PKSs are characterized by a Cys-His-His catalytic triad. Typical products of type III PKSs include phenolic lipids like alkylresorcinols.

In addition to these three types of PKSs, they can be further classified as iterative or noniterative. Iterative Type II PKSs reuse domains in a cyclic fashion.

Other classifications include the degree of reduction performed during the synthesis of the growing polyketide chain.

- NR-PKSs — non-reducing PKSs, the products of which are true polyketides
- PR-PKSs — partially reducing PKSs
- FR-PKSs — fully reducing PKSs, the products of which are fatty acid derivatives

== Modules and domains ==
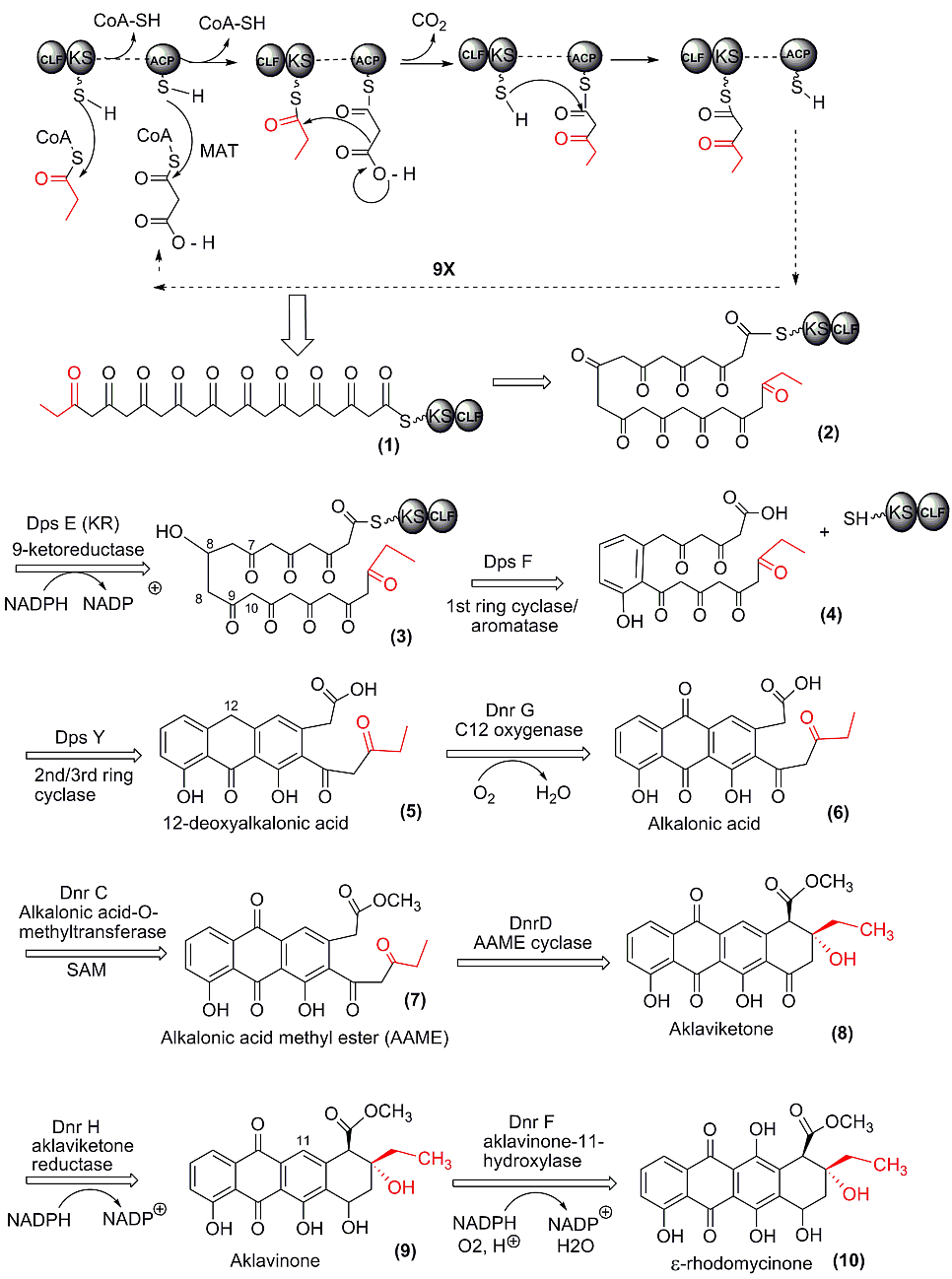
Biosynthesis of the doxorubicin precursor, є-rhodomycinone. The polyketide synthase reactions are shown on top.

Each type I polyketide-synthase module consists of several domains with defined functions, separated by short spacer regions. The order of modules and domains of a complete polyketide-synthase is as follows (in the order N-terminus to C-terminus):

- Starting or loading module: AT-ACP-
- Elongation or extending modules: -KS-AT-[DH-ER-KR]-ACP-
- Termination or releasing domain: -TE

Domains:

- AT: Acyltransferase
- ACP: Acyl carrier protein with an SH group on the cofactor, a serine-attached 4'-phosphopantetheine
- KS: Keto-synthase with an SH group on a cysteine side-chain
- KR: Ketoreductase
- DH: Dehydratase
- ER: Enoylreductase
- MT: Methyltransferase O- or C- (α or β)
- SH: PLP-dependent cysteine lyase
- TE: Thioesterase

The polyketide chain and the starter groups are bound with their carboxy functional group to the SH groups of the ACP and the KS domain through a thioester linkage: R-C(=O)OH + HS-protein <=> R-C(=O)S-protein + H_{2}O.

The ACP carrier domains are similar to the PCP carrier domains of nonribosomal peptide synthetases, and some proteins combine both types of modules.

== Pharmacological relevance ==
Polyketide synthases are an important source of naturally occurring small molecules used for chemotherapy. For example, many of the commonly used antibiotics, such as tetracycline and macrolides, are produced by polyketide synthases. Other industrially important polyketides are sirolimus (immunosuppressant), erythromycin (antibiotic), lovastatin (anticholesterol drug), and epothilone B (anticancer drug).

Polyketides are a large family of natural products widely used as drugs, pesticides, herbicides, and biological probes.

And are researched for the synthesis of biofuels and industrial chemicals.

== Ecological significance ==
Only about 1% of all known molecules are natural products, yet it has been recognized that almost two thirds of all drugs currently in use are at least in part derived from a natural source. This bias is commonly explained with the argument that natural products have co-evolved in the environment for long time periods and have therefore been pre-selected for active structures. Polyketide synthase products include lipids with antibiotic, antifungal, antitumor, and predator-defense properties; however, many of the polyketide synthase pathways that bacteria, fungi and plants commonly use have not yet been characterized. Methods for the detection of novel polyketide synthase pathways in the environment have therefore been developed. Molecular evidence supports the notion that many novel polyketides remain to be discovered from bacterial sources.

== See also ==
- Colibactin
- Doxorubicin
