= Serine O-acetyltransferase =

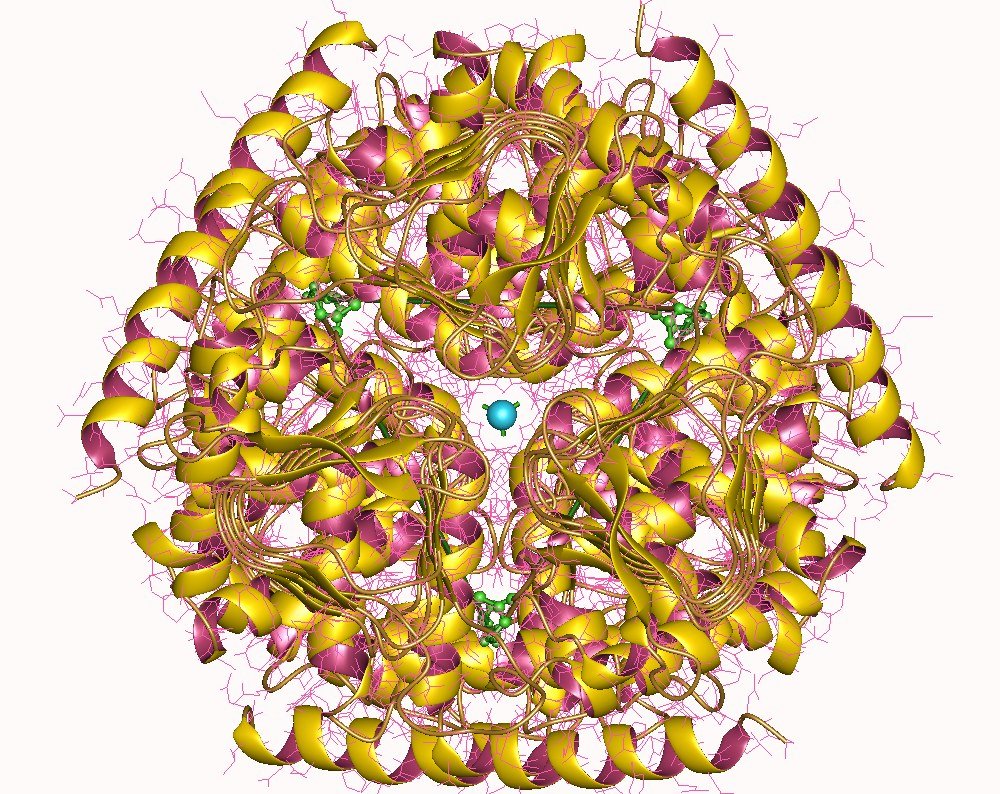
- Serine acetyltransferase hexamer, Haemophilus influenzae

Identifiers
- EC no.: 2.3.1.30
- CAS no.: 9023-16-9

Databases
- IntEnz: IntEnz view
- BRENDA: BRENDA entry
- ExPASy: NiceZyme view
- KEGG: KEGG entry
- MetaCyc: metabolic pathway
- PRIAM: profile
- PDB structures: RCSB PDB PDBe PDBsum
- Gene Ontology: AmiGO / QuickGO
Search
- PMC: articles
- PubMed: articles
- NCBI: proteins

Serine O-acetyltransferase (EC 2.3.1.30) is an enzyme that catalyzes the chemical reaction

acetyl-CoA + L-serine $\rightleftharpoons$ CoA + O-acetyl-L-serine

The two substrates of this enzyme are L-serine and acetyl-CoA. Its products are O-acetyl-L-serine and CoA.

This enzyme belongs to the family of transferases, specifically those acyltransferases transferring groups other than aminoacyl groups. The systematic name of this enzyme class is acetyl-CoA:L-serine O-acetyltransferase. Other names in common use include SATase, L-serine acetyltransferase, serine acetyltransferase, and serine transacetylase. This enzyme participates in cysteine metabolism and sulfur metabolism.

== Structural studies ==
As of late 2007, 7 structures have been solved for this class of enzymes, with PDB accession codes 1S80, 1SSM, 1SSQ, 1SST, 1T3D, 1Y7L, and 2ISQ.

== N terminal protein domain ==
SATase N terminal domain
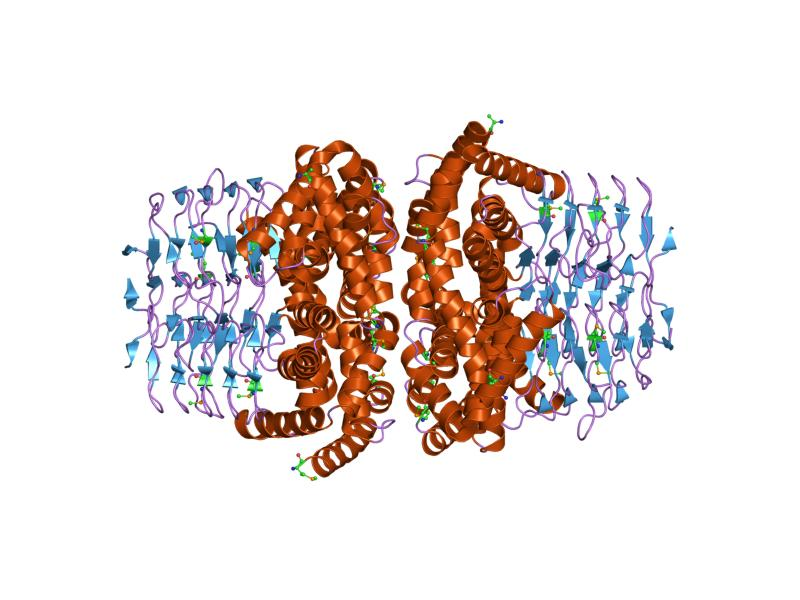
- The structure of the enzyme serine acetyltransferase- apoenzyme (truncated)

Identifiers
- Symbol: SATase_N
- Pfam: PF06426
- InterPro: IPR010493
Available protein structures:
- PDB: IPR010493 PF06426 (ECOD; PDBsum)
- AlphaFold: IPR010493; PF06426

In molecular biology, the protein domain SATase is short for Serine acetyltransferase and refers to an enzyme that catalyses the conversion of L-serine to L-cysteine in Escherichia coli. Its role is to catalyse the activation of L-serine by acetyl-CoA. This entry refers to the N-terminus of the protein which has a sequence that is conserved in plants and bacteria.

== Function ==
The N-terminal domain of the protein Serine O-acetyltransferase catalyses the O-acetylation of the amino acid and has been characterised in Escherichia coli, Salmonella typhimurium. and Phaseolus vulgaris.

Serine
+
Acetyl-CoA
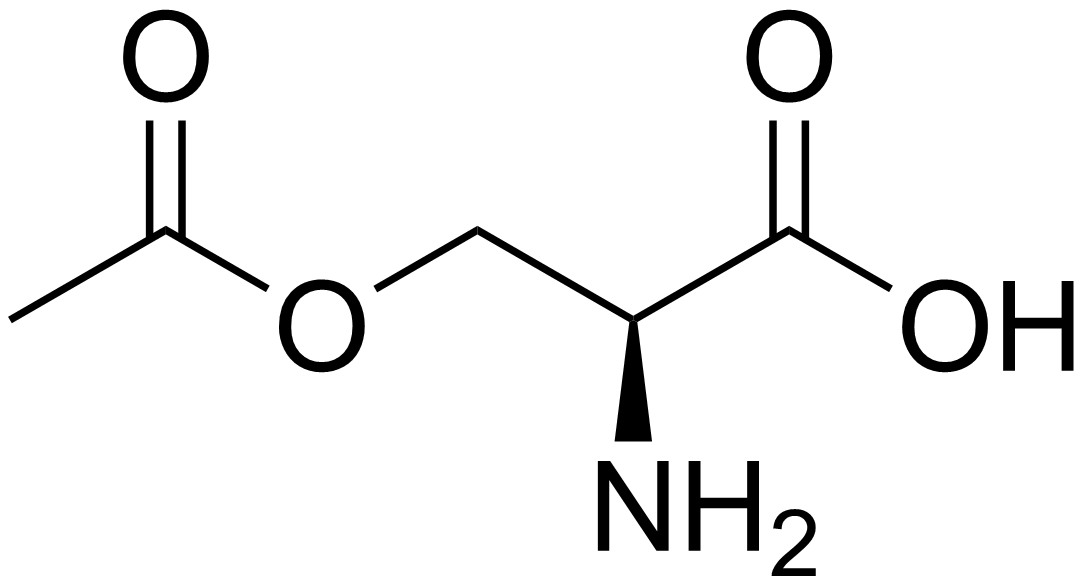
O-Acetylserine
+ Coenzyme A

The enzyme acts together with cysteine synthase to convert serine into cysteine, a precursor to the essential amino acid, methionine. Serine acetyltransferase has been overexpressed in transgenic plants. These should contain more essential sulphur amino acids meaning a healthier diet for humans and animals.

== Structure ==
The amino-terminal alpha-helical domain particularly the amino acid residues His158 (histidine in position 158) and Asp143 (aspartic acid in position 143) form a catalytic triad with the substrate for acetyl transfer. There are eight alpha helices that form the N-terminal domain.
