= CoA-glutathione reductase =

Enzyme

Identifiers
- EC no.: 1.8.1.10
- CAS no.: 37256-33-0

Databases
- BRENDA: enzyme data
- ExPASy: NiceZyme view
- KEGG: enzyme entry
- MetaCyc: metabolic pathway
- Rhea: reactions
- PDB structures: RCSB PDB PDBe PDBsum
- Gene Ontology: AmiGO / QuickGO
Search
- PMC: articles
- PubMed: articles
- NCBI: proteins

In enzymology, a CoA-glutathione reductase (EC 1.8.1.10) is an enzyme that catalyzes the chemical reaction

CoA + glutathione + NADP^{+} $\rightleftharpoons$ CoA-glutathione + NADPH + H^{+}

The 3 substrates of this enzyme are CoA, glutathione, and NADP^{+}, whereas its 3 products are CoA-glutathione, NADPH, and H^{+}.

This enzyme belongs to the family of oxidoreductases, specifically those acting on a sulfur group of donors with NAD+ or NADP+ as acceptor. The systematic name of this enzyme class is glutathione:NADP+ oxidoreductase (CoA-acylating). Other names in common use include coenzyme A glutathione disulfide reductase, NADPH-dependent coenzyme A-SS-glutathione reductase, coenzyme A disulfide-glutathione reductase, and NADPH:CoA-glutathione oxidoreductase. This enzyme participates in cysteine metabolism. It employs one cofactor, FAD.
