= Cysteine transaminase =

Identifiers
- EC no.: 2.6.1.3
- CAS no.: 9030-32-4

Databases
- IntEnz: IntEnz view
- BRENDA: BRENDA entry
- ExPASy: NiceZyme view
- KEGG: KEGG entry
- MetaCyc: metabolic pathway
- PRIAM: profile
- PDB structures: RCSB PDB PDBe PDBsum
- Gene Ontology: AmiGO / QuickGO
Search
- PMC: articles
- PubMed: articles
- NCBI: proteins

Cysteine transaminase (EC 2.6.1.3) is an enzyme characterised from rat liver that catalyzes a reversible chemical reaction that interconverts L-cysteine and α-ketoglutaric acid with 3-mercaptopyruvic acid and L-glutamic acid:

cysteine
+
α-ketoglutaric acid
3-mercapto
pyruvic acid
+
glutamic acid

This enzyme is a transferase, specifically the transaminases, which transfer nitrogenous groups. The systematic name of this enzyme class is L-cysteine:2-oxoglutarate aminotransferase. Other names in common use include cysteine aminotransferase, L-cysteine aminotransferase, and CGT. This enzyme participates in cysteine metabolism. It employs one cofactor, pyridoxal phosphate.
