= Glutathione—cystine transhydrogenase =

Identifiers
- EC no.: 1.8.4.4
- CAS no.: 37256-49-8

Databases
- IntEnz: IntEnz view
- BRENDA: BRENDA entry
- ExPASy: NiceZyme view
- KEGG: KEGG entry
- MetaCyc: metabolic pathway
- PRIAM: profile
- PDB structures: RCSB PDB PDBe PDBsum
- Gene Ontology: AmiGO / QuickGO
Search
- PMC: articles
- PubMed: articles
- NCBI: proteins

Glutathione—cystine transhydrogenase (EC 1.8.4.4) is an enzyme that catalyzes the chemical reaction

cystine
+ 2
glutathione
glutathione disulfide
+ 2
cysteine

The substrates of this enzyme are glutathione and cystine. Its products are glutathione disulfide and cysteine.

This enzyme belongs to the family of oxidoreductases, specifically those acting on a sulfur group of donors with a disulfide as acceptor. The systematic name of this enzyme class is glutathione:cystine oxidoreductase. Other names in common use include GSH-cystine transhydrogenase, and NADPH-dependent GSH-cystine transhydrogenase. This enzyme participates in cysteine metabolism and glutathione metabolism.
