= Thiazolidine =

Names
- Preferred IUPAC name 1,3-Thiazolidine

Identifiers
CAS Number	504-78-9
3D model (JSmol)	Interactive image
Beilstein Reference	102469
ChEBI	CHEBI:50120
ChEMBL	ChEMBL1916078
ChemSpider	10013
ECHA InfoCard	100.007.275
EC Number	208-002-5
Gmelin Reference	2171
PubChem CID	10444
UNII	I320806BKW
CompTox Dashboard (EPA)	DTXSID10198447
- InChI: InChI=1S/C3H7NS/c1-2-5-3-4-1/h4H,1-3H2 Key: OGYGFUAIIOPWQD-UHFFFAOYSA-N
- SMILES: C1CSCN1

Properties
Chemical formula	C_{3}H_{7}NS
Molar mass	89.16 g·mol^{−1}
Density	1.131 g/cm^{3}
Boiling point	72 to 75 °C (162 to 167 °F; 345 to 348 K) at 25 torr
- Except where otherwise noted, data are given for materials in their standard state (at 25 °C [77 °F], 100 kPa). verify (what is ?) Infobox references

Thiazolidine is a heterocyclic organic compound with the formula (CH_{2})_{3}(NH)S. It is a 5-membered saturated ring with a thioether group and an amine group in the 1 and 3 positions. It is a sulfur analog of oxazolidine. Thiazolidine is a colorless liquid. Although the parent thiazolidine is only of academic interest, some derivatives, i.e., the thiazolidines, are important, such as the antibiotic penicillin.

== Preparation ==
Thiazolidine is prepared by the condensation of cysteamine and formaldehyde. Other thiazolidines may be synthesized by similar condensations. A notable derivative is 4-carboxythiazolidine (thioproline), derived from formaldehyde and cysteine. The 2-oxo-thiazolidine procysteine is produced from phosgenation of cysteine.

== Derivatives ==
The penicillins are elaborate thiazolidine.

Useful thiazolidines include the drug pioglitazone, the antibiotic penicillin, and N-methyl-2-thiazolidinethione, an accelerator for the vulcanization of chloroprene rubbers.

Thiazolidines functionalized with carbonyls at the 2 and 4 positions, the thiazolidinediones, are drugs used in the treatment of diabetes mellitus type 2. Rhodanine is a related bioactive species, featuring one carbonyl and one thiocarbonyl.

Many thiazolidines are prepared by condensation of aldehydes with cysteine (and related aminothiols). Perhaps best known is the ring formed from cysteine and formaldehyde. Reduction of this species with sodium/ammonia cleaves one C-S bond, giving N-methylcysteine.

=== Ring-chain equilibria ===
Cysteine condenses readily with p-aminocinnamaldehyde to give the thiazolidine. Homocysteine on the other hand, condenses to give the imino-thiol but ring closure does not occur. This dichotomy has been proposed as an analytical tool.

The corresponding oxazolidines also fail to form as readily as the thiazolidines. Instead, the acyclic imino alcohol is favored.

== See also ==
- Thiazole
- Thiazoline
