= Peptidyl-Asp metalloendopeptidase =

Identifiers
- EC no.: 3.4.24.33
- CAS no.: 55576-49-3

Databases
- IntEnz: IntEnz view
- BRENDA: BRENDA entry
- ExPASy: NiceZyme view
- KEGG: KEGG entry
- MetaCyc: metabolic pathway
- PRIAM: profile
- PDB structures: RCSB PDB PDBe PDBsum
Search
- PMC: articles
- PubMed: articles
- NCBI: proteins

Peptidyl-Asp metalloendopeptidase (EC 3.4.24.33, endoproteinase Asp-N, peptidyl-Asp metalloproteinase) is an enzyme. This enzyme catalyses the following chemical reaction

Cleavage of Xaa-Asp, Xaa-Glu and Xaa- cysteic acid bonds

== History ==
Peptidyl-Asp metalloendopeptidase was first discovered when it was isolated from the supernatant of Pseudomonas fragi. Originally, it was thought that this bacteria produced only a single proteinase, but later it was discovered that P. fragi can produce more than one proteinase species. This is of interest due to the fact that one of the mutants identified has a cleavage specificity that was previously unknown and can be used in protein sequencing. This enzyme became commercialized as endoproteinase (Asp-N).

== Overview ==
The structure consists of a single chain protein with a molecular mass of 24,440 kDa when analyzed with a mass spectrometer. In an SDS gel, the band lies within the 27,000 kDa region. The protein sequence contains a HEXXH pattern which can be utilized as a zinc binding site. It belongs to the M72 family MEROPS. This enzyme is useful because it cleaves specific peptide bonds in aspartic acid (Xaa-Cya) and cysteic acid (Xaa-Cya) residues at the N-terminus however this enzyme is unable to cleave isoaspartic acid. Typically cleavage of glutamic acid requires specific conditions, but is much slower than the aspartyl peptides. This cleavage can be controlled by reducing the concentration of enzymes in the digestion process and cutting down the incubation time. There are a few ways to determine the activity of this enzyme. This can be accomplished by performing a proteinase assay using proteins as substrates, using a fluorescence assay looking for self quenching detrimeric peptide.

Succinimide is an intermediate that is formed when the alpha carbon on Asp or Asn is lost, this is a very specific event which occurs in Asp 58 and Asn 151 of alpha crystalline. This is common among beta amyloids that are received from the elderly, thus leading to believe that there is involvement with this mutation and aging. Isoaspartic acid (isoAsp) has also been shown to have involvement with aging, autoimmune disorders, cancer and neurodegeneration. This acid is created when asparagine undergoes deamination or isomerization of aspartic acid occurs. This is concerning for the pharmaceutical industry because it can cause aggregation or even disrupt enzyme activity. However, it is difficult to conduct further research because of the similarity in mass and chemical properties of isoAsp and Asp.
