= Cysteine–tRNA ligase =

Enzyme family

Identifiers
- EC no.: 6.1.1.16
- CAS no.: 37318-56-2

Databases
- BRENDA: enzyme data
- ExPASy: NiceZyme view
- KEGG: enzyme entry
- MetaCyc: metabolic pathway
- Rhea: reactions
- PDB structures: RCSB PDB PDBe PDBsum
- Gene Ontology: AmiGO / QuickGO
Search
- PMC: articles
- PubMed: articles
- NCBI: proteins

In enzymology, a cysteine–tRNA ligase (EC 6.1.1.16) is an enzyme that catalyzes the chemical reaction:

ATP + L-cysteine + tRNA^{Cys} $\rightleftharpoons$ AMP + diphosphate + L-cysteinyl-tRNA^{Cys}

The three substrates of this enzyme are ATP, L-cysteine, and tRNA^{Cys}, whereas its three products are AMP, diphosphate, and L-cysteinyl-tRNA^{Cys}.

There are two isozymes in humans, encoded by the genes CARS1 (cytoplasmic) and CARS2 (mitochondrial). This enzyme belongs to the family of ligases, specifically those forming carbon–oxygen bonds in aminoacyl-tRNA and related compounds. The systematic name of this enzyme class is L-cysteine:tRNA^{Cys} ligase (AMP-forming). Other names in common use include cysteinyl-tRNA synthetase, cysteinyl-transferRNA synthetase, cysteinyl-transfer ribonucleate synthetase, and cysteine translase. This enzyme participates in cysteine metabolism and aminoacyl-tRNA biosynthesis.

== Structural studies ==
As of late 2007, three structures have been solved for this class of enzymes, with PDB accession codes PDB: 1LI5, PDB: 1LI7, and PDB: 1U0B.
