= Cysteine–tRNA ligase, cytoplasmic =

Enzyme found in humans

CARS1

Identifiers
- Aliases: CARS1, cysteinyl-tRNA synthetase 1, CYSRS, cysteinyl-tRNA synthetase, MDBH, CARS, MCDDBH, MGC:11246
- External IDs: OMIM: 123859; MGI: 1351477; GeneCards: CARS1
Enzyme activity
EC #	BRENDA	ExPASy	KEGG	MetaCyc
6.1.1.16	↗	↗	↗	↗

Gene location (Human)
Chr.	Chromosome 11 (human)
Band	11p15.4	Start	3,000,922 bp
Band	11p15.4	End	3,057,613 bp

Gene location (Mouse)
Chr.	Chromosome 7 (mouse)
Band	7 F5|7 88.25 cM	Start	143,110,967 bp
Band	7 F5|7 88.25 cM	End	143,153,827 bp
RNA expression pattern
Bgee	Human / Mouse (ortholog); Top expressed in: olfactory zone of nasal mucosa; blood; stromal cell of endometrium; left lobe of thyroid gland; granulocyte; skin of leg; prefrontal cortex; right lobe of thyroid gland; anterior pituitary; hypothalamus / Top expressed in: neural layer of retina; esophagus; muscle of thigh; yolk sac; gastrula; tail of embryo; ventricular zone; lip; parotid gland; lens; More reference expression data
BioGPS	n/a
Gene ontology
Molecular function	aminoacyl-tRNA ligase activity; tRNA binding; cysteine-tRNA ligase activity; nucleotide binding; ligase activity; protein binding; ATP binding; protein homodimerization activity; metal ion binding
Cellular component	cytoplasm; cytosol
Biological process	tRNA aminoacylation for protein translation; cysteinyl-tRNA aminoacylation; protein biosynthesis
Sources:Amigo / QuickGO
Orthologs
Databases	NCBI: entry; OMA: entry
Species	Human	Mouse
Entrez	833	27267
Ensembl	ENSG00000110619; ENSG00000278191	ENSMUSG00000010755
UniProt	P49589	Q9ER72
RefSeq (mRNA)	NM_001014437; NM_001014438; NM_001194997; NM_001751; NM_139273 NM_001378136; NM_001378137; NM_001378138; NM_001378139; NM_001378140	NM_001252593; NM_013742
RefSeq (protein)	NP_001014437; NP_001181926; NP_001742; NP_644802; NP_001365065 NP_001365066; NP_001365067; NP_001365068; NP_001365069	NP_001239522; NP_038770
Location (UCSC)	Chr 11: 3 – 3.06 Mb	Chr 7: 143.11 – 143.15 Mb
PubMed search
- Wikidata
View/Edit Human	View/Edit Mouse

Cysteine–tRNA ligase, cytoplasmic, also called Cysteinyl-tRNA synthetase 1, is an enzyme (EC 6.1.1.16) that in humans is encoded by the CARS1 gene. It is a cysteine–tRNA ligase (a type of aminoacyl tRNA synthetase) that attaches the cysteine amino acid onto its corresponding transfer RNA (tRNA). Cysteinyl tRNA in turn is used by the ribosome to transfer cysteine onto a growing peptide chain during protein synthesis, according to the genetic code.

== Clinical significance ==
=== Trichothiodystrophy ===
Bi-allelic mutations in CARS1 have been identified to cause the non-photosensitive form of trichothiodystrophy (TTD-NPS). This disorder is characterized by neurodevelopmental problems, sulfur-deficient brittle hair and nails, ichthyosis, and growth retardation. In contrast to the photosensitive version of TTD (PS-TTD), which has the characteristics of progressive neuropathy and accelerated aging, NPS-TTD is not linked with premature aging.

According to one study, individuals who present with bi-allelic CARS loss-of-function mutations are unique in presenting with a brittle-hair-and-nail phenotype, which could be related to the high cysteine content in human keratins.
