= Uracilylalanine synthase =

Class of enzymes

Identifiers
- EC no.: 2.5.1.53
- CAS no.: 113573-73-2

Databases
- IntEnz: IntEnz view
- BRENDA: BRENDA entry
- ExPASy: NiceZyme view
- KEGG: KEGG entry
- MetaCyc: metabolic pathway
- PRIAM: profile
- PDB structures: RCSB PDB PDBe PDBsum
- Gene Ontology: AmiGO / QuickGO
Search
- PMC: articles
- PubMed: articles
- NCBI: proteins

Uracilylalanine synthase (EC 2.5.1.53) is an enzyme that catalyzes the chemical reaction

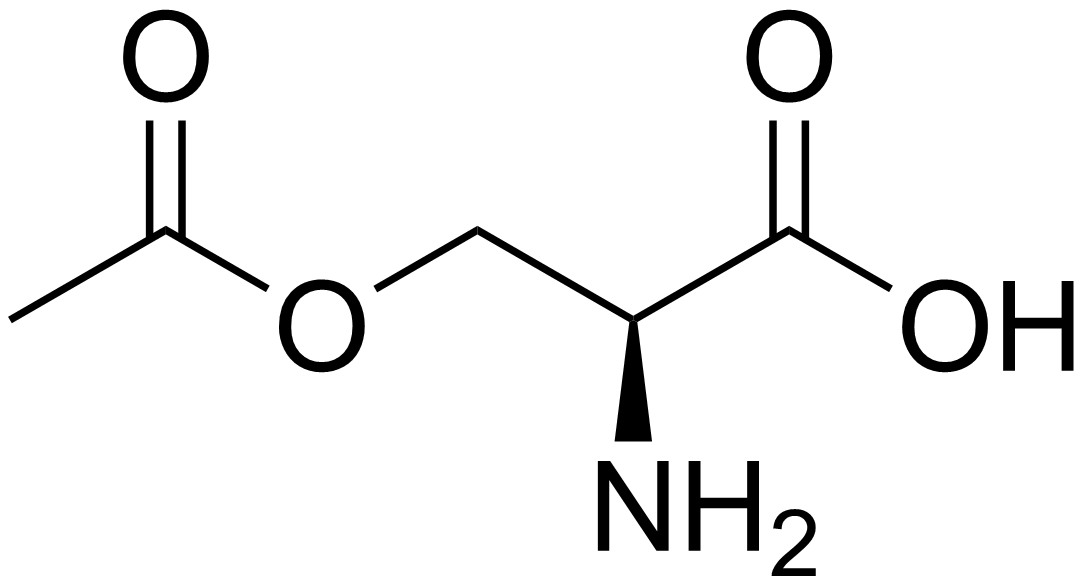
O-acetylserine
+
uracil
acetic acid
+
willardiine

The two substrates of this plant enzyme are O-acetylserine and uracil. Its products are acetic acid and willardine. The enzyme has been characterised from pea. Although it transfers a 2-amino-2-carboxyethyl group from O-acetylserine, it has been shown not to be the same protein as cysteine synthase.

This enzyme is a transferases, specifically those transferring aryl or alkyl groups other than methyl groups. The systematic name of this enzyme class is O3-acetyl-L-serine:uracil 1-(2-amino-2-carboxyethyl)transferase. Other names in common use include O3-acetyl-L-serine acetate-lyase (adding uracil), isowillardiine synthase, willardiine synthase, and 3-O-acetyl-L-serine:uracil 1-(2-amino-2-carboxyethyl)transferase.
