= Cystine reductase =

Class of enzymes

Identifiers
- EC no.: 1.8.1.6
- CAS no.: 9029-18-9

Databases
- IntEnz: IntEnz view
- BRENDA: BRENDA entry
- ExPASy: NiceZyme view
- KEGG: KEGG entry
- MetaCyc: metabolic pathway
- PRIAM: profile
- PDB structures: RCSB PDB PDBe PDBsum
- Gene Ontology: AmiGO / QuickGO
Search
- PMC: articles
- PubMed: articles
- NCBI: proteins

Cystine reductase (EC 1.8.1.6) is an enzyme that catalyzes the chemical reaction

cystine
+ NADPH
H^{+}
H^{+}
2
cysteine
+ NAD^{+}

The three substrates of this enzyme are L-cystine, reduced nicotinamide adenine dinucleotide (NADH) and a proton. Its products are L-cysteine and oxidised NAD^{+}.

This enzyme belongs to the family of oxidoreductases, specifically those acting on a sulfur group of donors with NAD+ or NADP+ as acceptor. The systematic name of this enzyme class is L-cysteine:NAD+ oxidoreductase. Other names in common use include cystine reductase (NADH), NADH-dependent cystine reductase, cystine reductase (NADH2), and NADH2:L-cystine oxidoreductase. This enzyme participates in cysteine metabolism.
