= Thioproline =

Names
- Other names (R)-1,3-Thiazolidin-3-ium-4-carboxylate, Timonacic.

Identifiers
CAS Number	444-27-9; L: 34592-47-7
3D model (JSmol)	L: Interactive image; zitteranion: Interactive image
Abbreviations	H-Thz-OH
ChEBI	L: CHEBI:45171
ChEMBL	L: ChEMBL1235440
ChemSpider	L: 84120
DrugBank	DB02846
ECHA InfoCard	100.006.498
EC Number	L: 256-240-3
PubChem CID	L: 93176; zitteranion: 6973609
UNII	L: KL096K0KXL
CompTox Dashboard (EPA)	DTXSID9023675
- InChI: L: InChI=1S/C4H7NO2S/c6-4(7)3-1-8-2-5-3/h3,5H,1-2H2,(H,6,7)/t3-/m0/s1 Key: DZLNHFMRPBPULJ-VKHMYHEASA-N
- SMILES: L: C1[C@H](NCS1)C(=O)O; zitteranion: C1[C@H]([NH2+]CS1)C(=O)[O-]

Properties
Chemical formula	C_{4}H_{7}NO_{2}S
Molar mass	133.17 g·mol^{−1}
Appearance	white solid
Density	1.578 g/cm^{3}
Melting point	196.5 °C (385.7 °F; 469.6 K)

Hazards
- GHS labelling
Pictograms	(GHS06: Toxic) (GHS07: Exclamation mark)
Signal word	Danger
Hazard statements	H301, H312, H315, H319, H332, H335
Precautionary statements	P261, P264, P264+P265, P270, P271, P280, P301+P316, P302+P352, P304+P340, P305+P351+P338, P317, P319, P321, P330, P332+P317, P337+P317, P362+P364, P403+P233, P405, P501
- Except where otherwise noted, data are given for materials in their standard state (at 25 °C [77 °F], 100 kPa). Infobox references

Thioproline is a nonproteinogenic amino acid with the formula (CH_{2}SCH_{2}NHCH)CO_{2}H, although it crystallizes as the zwitterion (CH_{2}SCH_{2}NH^{+}_{2}CH)CO^{−}_{2}. It consists of a 1,3-thiazolidine ring ( (CH_{2}SCH_{2}NHCH_{2})) substituted with a carboxylic acid. It is synthesized by reaction of formaldehyde and cysteine. It occurs in nature, but rarely. It forms a coordination complex with cobalt.

An important use of timonacic is in the synthesis of timofibrate.
