= Iron sulfide =

Index of minerals and related terms with the same name

Iron sulfide or iron sulphide can refer to range of chemical compounds composed of iron and sulfur.

== Minerals ==
By increasing order of stability:

- Iron(II) sulfide, FeS
- Greigite, Fe_{3}S_{4} (cubic)
- Pyrrhotite, Fe_{1−x}S (where x = 0 to 0.2) (monoclinic or hexagonal)
- Troilite, FeS, the endmember of pyrrhotite (hexagonal)
- Mackinawite, Fe_{1+x}S (where x = 0 to 0.1) (tetragonal)
- Marcasite, orthorhombic FeS_{2}
- Pyrite, cubic FeS_{2} (fool's gold)
- Arsenopyrite (mispickel), FeAsS, or Fe(As-S), Fe(III) mixed arseno-sulfide (monoclinic)

== Synthetic ==
- Iron(III) sulfide, Fe_{2}S_{3}
- Iron-sulfur clusters, includes both synthetic and biological

== Biological ==
- Iron–sulfur protein
