= Colibactin =

Names
- IUPAC name 2-[6-[(2S)-2-methyl-3,4-dihydro-2H-pyrrol-5-yl]-5-oxo-4-azaspiro[2.4]hept-6-en-7-yl]-N-[[4-[2-[4-[2-[[2-[6-[(2S)-2-methyl-3,4-dihydro-2H-pyrrol-5-yl]-5-oxo-4-azaspiro[2.4]hept-6-en-7-yl]acetyl]amino]acetyl]-1,3-thiazol-2-yl]-2-oxoacetyl]-1,3-thiazol-2-yl]methyl]acetamide

Identifiers
3D model (JSmol)	Interactive image
ChEBI	CHEBI:156303
ChemSpider	115010508
KEGG	C22668
PubChem CID	138805674
CompTox Dashboard (EPA)	DTXSID501336855
- InChI: InChI=1S/C37H38N8O7S2/c1-17-3-5-21(40-17)29-19(36(7-8-36)44-33(29)51)11-26(47)38-13-25(46)23-15-54-35(43-23)32(50)31(49)24-16-53-28(42-24)14-39-27(48)12-20-30(22-6-4-18(2)41-22)34(52)45-37(20)9-10-37/h15-18H,3-14H2,1-2H3,(H,38,47)(H,39,48)(H,44,51)(H,45,52)/t17-,18-/m0/s1 Key: ZWKHDAZPVITMAI-ROUUACIJSA-N
- SMILES: C[C@H]1CCC(=N1)C2=C(C3(CC3)NC2=O)CC(=O)NCC4=NC(=CS4)C(=O)C(=O)C5=NC(=CS5)C(=O)CNC(=O)CC6=C(C(=O)NC67CC7)C8=N[C@H](CC8)C

Properties
Chemical formula	C_{37}H_{38}N_{8}O_{7}S_{2}
Molar mass	770.88 g·mol^{−1}
- Except where otherwise noted, data are given for materials in their standard state (at 25 °C [77 °F], 100 kPa). Infobox references

Colibactin is a genotoxic metabolite produced by Escherichia coli and other Enterobacteriaceae. Colibactin is a polyketide peptide that can form inter-strand crosslinks in DNA. Colibactin forms DNA inter-strand cross-links by alkylation of adenine moieties on opposing DNA strands. It induces lytic development in certain bacteria that contain prophages. Colibactin is only produced by bacterial strains containing a polyketide synthase genomic island (pks) or clb biosynthetic gene cluster. About 20% of humans in high-income countries are colonized with E. coli that harbor the pks island.

== Role in cancer ==
Colibactin is believed to cause mutations leading to colorectal cancer and the progression of colorectal cancer, especially in early-onset colorectal cancers. Colibactin has been previously demonstrated to have a characteristic mutational signature due to its distinct mechanism. The same mutational signature has been discovered in several cohorts of colon cancer patients, and in smaller numbers of patients with urogenital and head and neck cancers. In urogenital cancers, colibactin exposure has been shown to increase mutational burden in benign cells. Colibactin exposure has been further linked to a proportion of adenomatous polyposis coli (APC) driver insertion-deletions (indels).
