= Iron(III) sulfide =

Unstable artificial chemical compound

Names
- IUPAC name Iron(III) sulfide
- Other names Iron sesquisulfide Ferric sulfide Diiron trisulfide

Identifiers
CAS Number	12063-27-3
3D model (JSmol)	Interactive image
ChEBI	CHEBI:75899
ChemSpider	141408
EC Number	234-367-5
PubChem CID	160957
UNII	003Q5FW7CS
CompTox Dashboard (EPA)	DTXSID30872530
- InChI: InChI=1S/2Fe.3S/q2*+3;3*-2 Key: KAEAMHPPLLJBKF-UHFFFAOYSA-N
- SMILES: [S-2].[S-2].[S-2].[Fe+3].[Fe+3]

Properties
Chemical formula	Fe_{2}S_{3}
Molar mass	207.90 g/mol
Appearance	yellow-green
Density	4.3 g/cm^{3}
Melting point	decomposition
Solubility in water	0.0062 g/L
- Except where otherwise noted, data are given for materials in their standard state (at 25 °C [77 °F], 100 kPa). verify (what is ?) Infobox references

Iron(III) sulfide, also known as ferric sulfide or sesquisulfide (Fe_{2}S_{3}), is one of the several binary iron sulfides. It is a solid, black powder that degrades at ambient temperature.

== Reactions ==
Fe_{2}S_{3} precipitates from solutions containing its respective ions:

2Fe^{3+} + 3S^{2−} → Fe_{2}S_{3}

The resulting solid decays at a temperature over 20 °C into iron(II) sulfide (FeS) and elemental sulfur: The same products also form when Fe^{3+} reacts with sulfide ions in alkaline solutions.

Fe_{2}S_{3} → 2 FeS + S

With hydrochloric acid it decays according to the following reaction equation:

Fe_{2}S_{3} + 4 HCl → 2 FeCl_{2}+ 2 H_{2}S + S

== Greigite ==
Greigite, with the chemical formula Fe^{2+}Fe^{3+}_{2}S_{4}, is a mixed valence compound containing both Fe(III) and Fe(II). It is the sulfur equivalent of the iron oxide magnetite (Fe_{3}O_{4}). As established by X-ray crystallography, the S anions form a cubic close-packed lattice, and the Fe cations occupy both tetrahedral and octahedral sites.
