= Cysteic acid =

l-Cysteic acid
- L-Cysteic acid

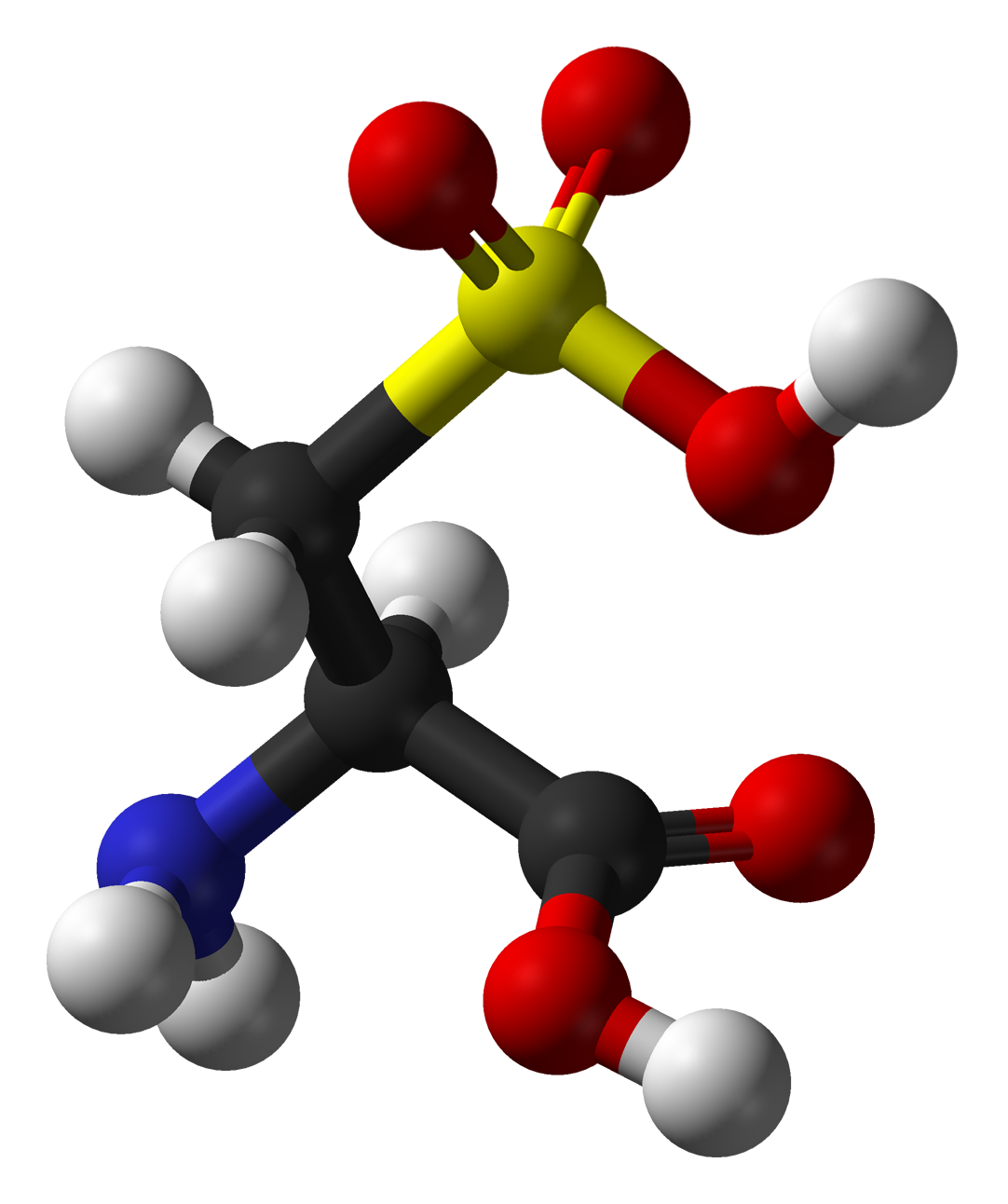
- Ball-and-stick model

Names
- IUPAC name (R)-2-Amino-3-sulfopropanoic acid
- Other names 3-Sulfo-l-alanine

Identifiers
CAS Number	13100-82-8 (D/L); 35554-98-4 (D); 498-40-8 (L)
3D model (JSmol)	Interactive image
ChEBI	CHEBI:17285
ChemSpider	65718
DrugBank	DB03661
ECHA InfoCard	100.265.539
EC Number	207-861-3
MeSH	Cysteic+acid
PubChem CID	25701
UNII	A3OGP4C37W (D/L); YWB11Z1XEI (D); M6W2DJ6N5K (L)
CompTox Dashboard (EPA)	DTXSID40862048
- InChI: InChI=1S/C3H7NO5S/c4-2(3(5)6)1-10(7,8)9/h2H,1,4H2,(H,5,6)(H,7,8,9)/t2-/m0/s1 Key: XVOYSCVBGLVSOL-REOHCLBHSA-N; InChI=1/C3H7NO5S/c4-2(3(5)6)1-10(7,8)9/h2H,1,4H2,(H,5,6)(H,7,8,9)/t2-/m0/s1
- SMILES: C(C(C(=O)O)N)S(=O)(=O)O

Properties
Chemical formula	C_{3}H_{7}NO_{5}S
Molar mass	169.15 g·mol^{−1}
Appearance	White crystals or powder
Melting point	Decomposes around 272 °C
Solubility in water	Soluble
- Except where otherwise noted, data are given for materials in their standard state (at 25 °C [77 °F], 100 kPa). verify (what is ?) Infobox references

Cysteic acid also known as 3-sulfo-l-alanine is the organic compound with the formula HO_{3}SCH_{2}CH(NH_{2})CO_{2}H. It is often referred to as cysteate, which near neutral pH takes the form ^{−}O_{3}SCH_{2}CH(NH_{3}^{+})CO_{2}^{−}.

It is an amino acid generated by oxidation of cysteine, whereby a thiol group is fully oxidized to a sulfonic acid/sulfonate group. It is further metabolized via 3-sulfolactate, which converts to pyruvate and sulfite/bisulfite. The enzyme L-cysteate sulfo-lyase catalyzes this conversion. Cysteate is a biosynthetic precursor to taurine in microalgae. By contrast, most taurine in animals is made from cysteine sulfinate.
