= D-Ribose-L-cysteine =

Clinical data
- Trade names: RiboCeine
- Other names: RibCys; Ribose-cysteine

Identifiers
- IUPAC name: (4R)-2-[(1R,2R,3R)-1,2,3,4-Tetrahydroxybutyl]-1,3-thiazolidine-4-carboxylic acid
- CAS Number: 232617-15-1
- PubChem CID: 11608533
- ChemSpider: 9783288
- UNII: 4PS0070ASU
- ChEBI: CHEBI:233278
- CompTox Dashboard (EPA): DTXSID50858376

Chemical and physical data
- Formula: C_{8}H_{15}NO_{6}S
- Molar mass: 253.27 g·mol^{−1}
- 3D model (JSmol): Interactive image
- SMILES: C1[C@H](NC(S1)[C@@H]([C@@H]([C@@H](CO)O)O)O)C(=O)O
- InChI: InChI=1S/C8H15NO6S/c10-1-4(11)5(12)6(13)7-9-3(2-16-7)8(14)15/h3-7,9-13H,1-2H2,(H,14,15)/t3-,4+,5+,6+,7?/m0/s1; Key:AGZXTDUDXXPCMJ-HZYAIORGSA-N

D-Ribose-L-cysteine (RiboCeine) is a chemical compound developed as a cysteine prodrug intended to increase endogenous production of glutathione, a naturally occurring intracellular antioxidant. Structurally, it consists of D-ribose, a pentose sugar involved in cellular energy metabolism, chemically bound to L-cysteine, an amino acid required for glutathione biosynthesis.

== Background ==
Glutathione plays a central role in cellular redox balance, detoxification, and immune regulation. Its synthesis depends on the availability of several amino acid substrates, of which cysteine is typically the rate-limiting precursor under physiological conditions.

Free L-cysteine is chemically unstable and readily oxidized in the gastrointestinal tract, which can limit its effectiveness when administered directly as a supplement. For this reason, a variety of cysteine-delivery strategies have been explored, including N-acetylcysteine (NAC) and other cysteine prodrugs.

D-Ribose-L-cysteine was developed as an alternative cysteine-delivery compound intended to improve cysteine stability and intracellular availability for glutathione synthesis.

== Development and patents ==
D-Ribose-L-cysteine was developed by Herbert T. Nagasawa, a medicinal chemist formerly affiliated with the United States Department of Veterans Affairs and the University of Minnesota, whose research focused on sulfur amino acid metabolism and hepatic toxicology.

The compound and its use as a glutathione-enhancing agent are protected by multiple patents, including United States Patent US 9,173,917 B2, assigned to Max International and the U.S. Department of Veterans Affairs.

D-Ribose-L-cysteine has since been incorporated into dietary supplement formulations marketed by Max International, Inc. and LiveMax, LLC.

== Preclinical research ==
=== Animal studies ===
Multiple animal studies have investigated the biological activity of D-ribose-L-cysteine in models of oxidative stress and metabolic injury. These studies have reported that D-ribose-L-cysteine supplementation increases intracellular and tissue glutathione levels, improves antioxidant enzyme activity, and reduces markers of oxidative damage in rodents.

In several experimental models, D-ribose-L-cysteine demonstrated equal or greater glutathione-enhancing effects compared with N-acetylcysteine, though these findings are limited to preclinical settings.

=== In vitro studies ===
Cell culture studies have reported that D-ribose-L-cysteine increases glutathione levels and modulates oxidative stress responses in normal cell lines exposed to cytotoxic agents.

== Human research ==
As of 2025, only limited human clinical data on D-ribose-L-cysteine have been published.

A small randomized, placebo-controlled pilot trial conducted in 2023 evaluated the effect of a D-ribose-L-cysteine-containing supplement on serum glutathione levels in healthy adults over a 28-day period. According to results released by the study sponsor, participants receiving D-ribose-L-cysteine experienced a statistically significant increase in serum glutathione relative to baseline, with larger increases observed in older participants.

The trial has not yet been independently replicated, and full peer-reviewed publication of the data has not been confirmed. Accordingly, the clinical significance of these findings remains preliminary.

== Mechanism of action ==
D-Ribose-L-cysteine functions as a cysteine prodrug, delivering cysteine in a chemically protected form that may resist premature oxidation. After cellular uptake, enzymatic cleavage releases free L-cysteine, which can then enter the γ-glutamyl cycle for glutathione synthesis.

This mechanism differs from N-acetylcysteine, which relies on de-acetylation and exhibits different absorption and metabolic characteristics. While both compounds ultimately increase cysteine availability, direct comparative data in humans remain limited.

== Regulatory status ==
D-Ribose-L-cysteine is regulated in the United States as a dietary supplement ingredient, not as a pharmaceutical drug. Products containing D-ribose-L-cysteine are subject to dietary supplement regulations under the Dietary Supplement Health and Education Act of 1994 (DSHEA), which prohibit claims that a product can diagnose, treat, cure, or prevent disease.

No pharmaceutical drug approvals or therapeutic indications have been granted for D-ribose-L-cysteine by the U.S. Food and Drug Administration.

== Commercial use ==
D-Ribose-L-cysteine is used as an ingredient in several commercially marketed dietary supplements, particularly products promoted for general antioxidant support and cellular health. The primary commercial producers and distributors include Max International, Inc. and LiveMax, LLC.

== Reception and scientific commentary ==
Proponents of D-ribose-L-cysteine reference its patented chemical structure and the results of laboratory and animal investigations demonstrating increased glutathione production under experimental conditions.

However, independent medical experts generally emphasize that evidence of clinical benefit in humans remains insufficient, noting the absence of large-scale randomized trials or systematic reviews establishing long-term health outcomes of glutathione-related supplementation in healthy populations.
