= Cysteine (data page) =

Chemical data page

The complete data for Cysteine
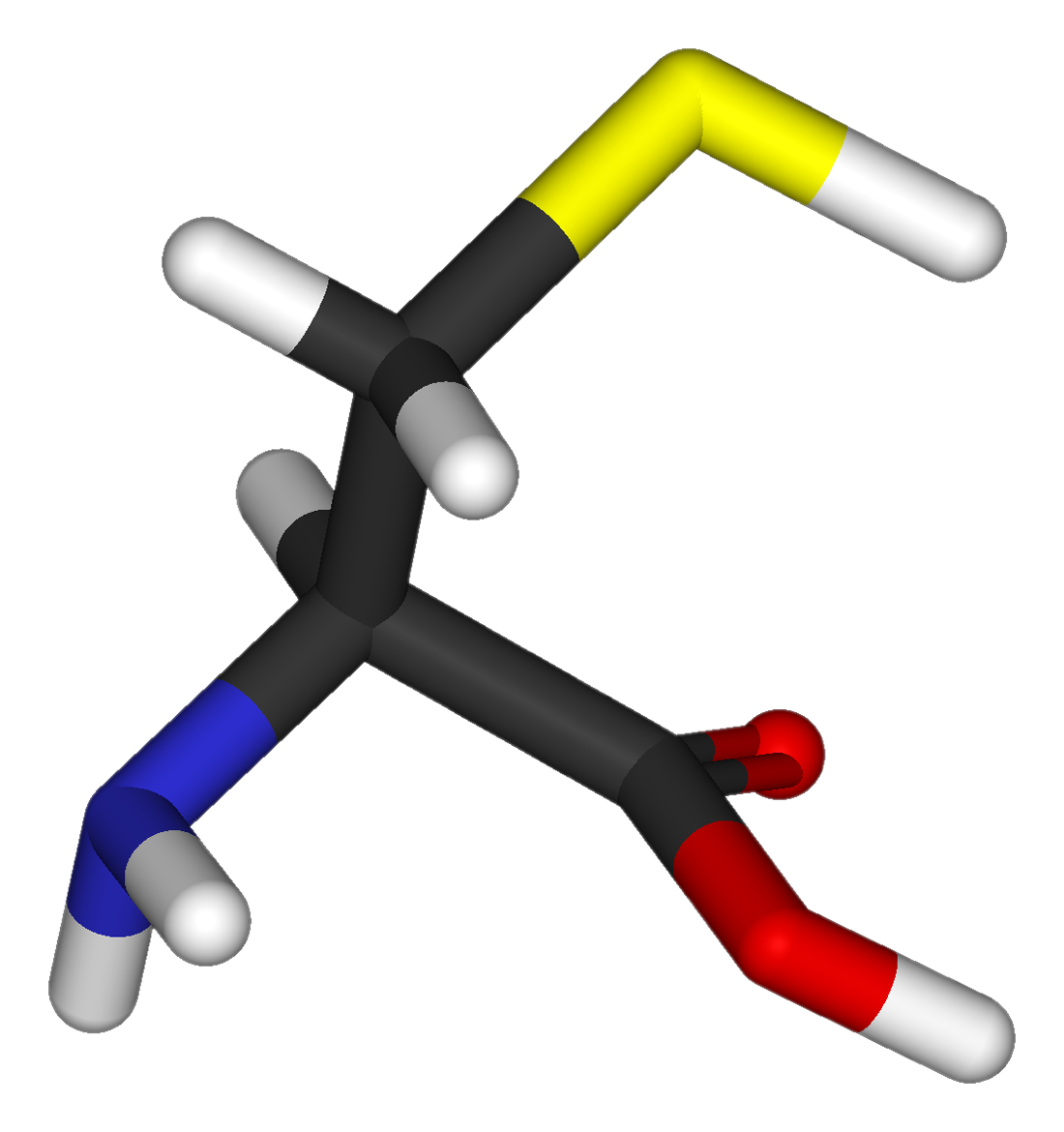
General information
Chemical formula: C_{3}H_{7}NO_{2}S
Molar mass: 121.16 g·mol^{−1}
Systematic name:
(2R)-2-amino-3-sulfanyl-propanoic acid
Abbreviations: C, Cys
Synonyms:
2-amino-3-mercaptopropanoic acid
2-amino-3-mercaptopropionic acid
2-amino-3-sulfanylpropanoic acid
3-mercaptoalanine
AIDS{-}160777
CHEBI:15356
CHEMBANK2703
NSC 63864
NSC647530
NSC8746
Zystein
Database data
SMILES: SCC(N)C(=O)O
InChI=1/C3H7NO2S/c4-2(1-7)3(5)6/h2,7H,1,4H2,(H,5,6)/f/h5H

ATC: N/A	CAS: [52-90-4]	DrugBank: N/A	EINECS: 200-158-2	PubChem: 5862

Physical properties

Structure	Crystal data	Spectral data: UV-Vis / IR / NMR / MS

Phase behavior	Solid properties T_{m}: 240 °C	Liquid properties	Gas properties

Hazard properties

MSDS N/A	Main hazards: N/A	NFPA 704	Flash point: N/A	RTECS number: N/A

Chemical properties

XLogP: -2.988	pI: 5.07	pK_{a}: 1.91; 8.14; 10.28	Tautomers:	Hydrogen bond: donor - 2; acceptor - 3

Pharmacological properties

This box:
- Except where noted otherwise, data relate to Standard temperature and pressure.
- Reliability of data general note.
