= L-cysteate sulfo-lyase =

Enzyme that lyses L-cysteate into pyruvate

Identifiers
- EC no.: 4.4.1.25

Databases
- IntEnz: IntEnz view
- BRENDA: BRENDA entry
- ExPASy: NiceZyme view
- KEGG: KEGG entry
- MetaCyc: metabolic pathway
- PRIAM: profile
- PDB structures: RCSB PDB PDBe PDBsum
Search
- PMC: articles
- PubMed: articles
- NCBI: proteins

The enzyme L-cysteate sulfo-lyase (EC 4.4.1.25) catalyzes the reaction

L-cysteate + H_{2}O = hydrogensulfite + pyruvate + NH_{3} (overall reaction)

(1a) L-cysteate = hydrogensulfite + 2-aminoprop-2-enoate
(1b) 2-aminoprop-2-enoate = 2-iminopropanoate (spontaneous)
(1c) 2-iminopropanoate + H_{2}O = pyruvate + NH_{3} (spontaneous)

This enzyme belongs to the family of lyases, specifically the class of carbon-sulfur lyases. The systematic name of this enzyme class is L-cysteate bisulfite-lyase (deaminating; pyruvate-forming). Other names in common use include L-cysteate sulfo-lyase (deaminating), and CuyA.
