= Procysteine =

Names
- Other names 2-oxo-4-thiazolidinecarboxylic acid, OTC

Identifiers
CAS Number	19771-63-2 R enantiomer
3D model (JSmol)	Interactive image
ChEBI	CHEBI:125673
ChEMBL	ChEMBL442218
ChemSpider	65323
DrugBank	DB12224
ECHA InfoCard	100.127.075
EC Number	606-375-2
PubChem CID	72390
UNII	X7063P804E
CompTox Dashboard (EPA)	DTXSID501318247
- InChI: InChI=1S/C4H5NO3S/c6-3(7)2-1-9-4(8)5-2/h2H,1H2,(H,5,8)(H,6,7)/t2-/m0/s1 Key: BMLMGCPTLHPWPY-REOHCLBHSA-N
- SMILES: C1[C@H](NC(=O)S1)C(=O)O

Properties
Chemical formula	C_{4}H_{5}NO_{3}S
Molar mass	147.15 g·mol^{−1}
Appearance	white solid
Density	1.709 g/cm^{3}
Melting point	168–170 °C (334–338 °F; 441–443 K)

Hazards
- GHS labelling
Pictograms	(GHS07: Exclamation mark)
Signal word	Warning
Hazard statements	H315, H319, H335
Precautionary statements	P261, P264, P264+P265, P271, P280, P302+P352, P304+P340, P305+P351+P338, P319, P321, P332+P317, P337+P317, P362+P364, P403+P233, P405, P501
- Except where otherwise noted, data are given for materials in their standard state (at 25 °C [77 °F], 100 kPa). Infobox references

Procysteine is an organic compound with the formula CH_{2}NHC(O)SCHCO_{2}H. It is a colorless solid. The compound is classified as a derivative of the heterocycle 2-oxo-1,3-thiazoline. Such rings are prepared by the action of phosgene (or related dehydration reagents on 2-aminoethanethiols, in this case cysteine:

HSCH_{2}CH(NH_{2})CO_{2}H + COCl_{2} → CH_{2}NHC(O)SCHCO_{2}H + 2 HCl

The compound hydrolyzes to cysteine. The hydrolysis is catalyzed by 5-oxoprolinase.
