= Cysteine synthase =

Class of enzymes

Identifiers
- EC no.: 2.5.1.47
- CAS no.: 37290-89-4

Databases
- IntEnz: IntEnz view
- BRENDA: BRENDA entry
- ExPASy: NiceZyme view
- KEGG: KEGG entry
- MetaCyc: metabolic pathway
- PRIAM: profile
- PDB structures: RCSB PDB PDBe PDBsum
- Gene Ontology: AmiGO / QuickGO
Search
- PMC: articles
- PubMed: articles
- NCBI: proteins

Cysteine synthase (EC 2.5.1.47) is an enzyme that catalyzes the chemical reaction

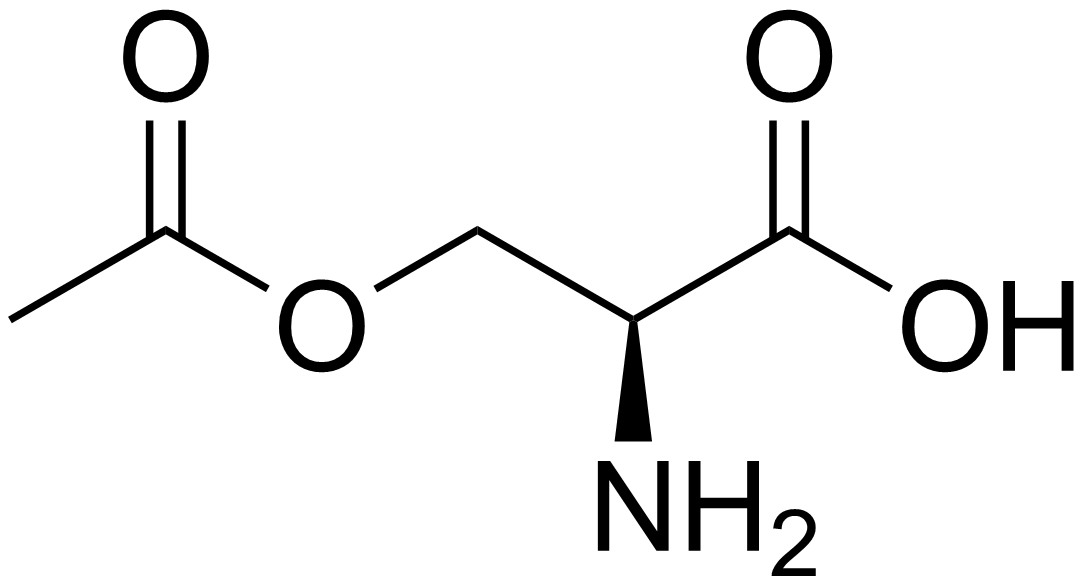
O-acetylserine
H_{2}S
acetic acid
+
cysteine

The two substrates of this enzyme first characterised from Salmonella typhimurium are O-acetylserine and hydrogen sulfide (H_{2}S). Its products are acetic acid and cysteine.

Quisqualic acid

The enzyme can transfer the 2-amino-2-carboxyethyl group to other nucleophiles. For example, it has been found to be involved in the final step of the biosynthesis of quisqualic acid in the vine Quisqualis indica. However, it has different selectivity to the enzyme uracilylalanine synthase, which also converts O-acetylserine to amino acid derivatives. It uses pyridoxal phosphate as a cofactor. Chloride and sulfate ions can act as inhibitors of the enzyme by binding at an allosteric site.

This enzyme is a transferase, specifically those transferring aryl or alkyl groups other than methyl groups. The systematic name of this enzyme class is O3-acetyl-L-serine:hydrogen-sulfide 2-amino-2-carboxyethyltransferase. Other names in common use include O-acetyl-L-serine sulfhydrylase, O-acetyl-L-serine sulfohydrolase, O-acetylserine (thiol)-lyase, O-acetylserine (thiol)-lyase A, O-acetylserine sulfhydrylase, O3-acetyl-L-serine acetate-lyase (adding hydrogen-sulfide), acetylserine sulfhydrylase, cysteine synthetase, S-sulfocysteine synthase, 3-O-acetyl-L-serine:hydrogen-sulfide, and 2-amino-2-carboxyethyltransferase. This enzyme participates in 3 metabolic pathways: cysteine metabolism, selenoamino acid metabolism, and sulfur metabolism.

== Structural studies ==
As of late 2007, 12 structures have been solved for this class of enzymes, with PDB accession codes 1O58, 1VE1, 1Y7L, 1Z7W, 1Z7Y, 2BHS, 2BHT, 2EGU, 2ISQ, 2Q3B, 2Q3C, and 2Q3D.
