= D-cysteine desulfhydrase =

Identifiers
- EC no.: 4.4.1.15
- CAS no.: 84012-74-8

Databases
- IntEnz: IntEnz view
- BRENDA: BRENDA entry
- ExPASy: NiceZyme view
- KEGG: KEGG entry
- MetaCyc: metabolic pathway
- PRIAM: profile
- PDB structures: RCSB PDB PDBe PDBsum
- Gene Ontology: AmiGO / QuickGO
Search
- PMC: articles
- PubMed: articles
- NCBI: proteins

The enzyme D-cysteine desulfhydrase (EC 4.4.1.15) catalyzes the chemical reaction

D-cysteine + H_{2}O $\rightleftharpoons$ sulfide + NH_{3} + pyruvate

This enzyme belongs to the family of lyases, specifically the class of carbon-sulfur lyases. The systematic name of this enzyme class is D-cysteine sulfide-lyase (deaminating; pyruvate-forming). Other names in common use include D-cysteine lyase, and D-cysteine sulfide-lyase (deaminating). This enzyme participates in cysteine metabolism.
