= Cysteine lyase =

cysteine lyase

Identifiers
- EC no.: 4.4.1.10
- CAS no.: 9079-86-1

Databases
- IntEnz: IntEnz view
- BRENDA: BRENDA entry
- ExPASy: NiceZyme view
- KEGG: KEGG entry
- MetaCyc: metabolic pathway
- PRIAM: profile
- PDB structures: RCSB PDB PDBe PDBsum
- Gene Ontology: AmiGO / QuickGO
Search
- PMC: articles
- PubMed: articles
- NCBI: proteins

The enzyme cysteine lyase (EC 4.4.1.10) catalyzes the chemical reaction

L-cysteine + sulfite $\rightleftharpoons$ L-cysteate + hydrogen sulfide

This enzyme belongs to the family of lyases, specifically the class of carbon-sulfur lyases. The systematic name of this enzyme class is L-cysteine hydrogen-sulfide-lyase (adding sulfite; L-cysteate-forming). Other names in common use include cysteine (sulfite) lyase, and L-cysteine hydrogen-sulfide-lyase (adding sulfite). This enzyme participates in cysteine and taurine metabolism. It employs one cofactor, pyridoxal phosphate.

== Evolution ==
Genes encoding cysteine lyase (CL) originated around 300 million years ago by a tandem gene duplication and neofunctionalization of cystathionine β-lyase (CBS) shortly after the split of mammalian and reptilian lineages. CL genes are found only in Sauropsida where they are involved in a metabolic pathway for sulfur metabolism in the chicken egg.
