= Cysteine metabolism =

Cysteine metabolism refers to the biological pathways that consume or create cysteine. The pathways of different amino acids and other metabolites interweave and overlap to creating complex systems.

== Human cysteine metabolism ==
In human cysteine metabolism, L-cysteine is consumed in several ways as shown below. L-Cysteine is also consumed in pantothenate/coenzyme A biosynthesis.

L-Cysteine consumption pathways
Enzyme	→	Products	Cofactor/Additional Reactant
cysteine dioxygenase	→	cysteine sulfinic acid	iron
serine racemase	→	D-cysteine	pyridoxal phosphate
cysteine lyase	→	L-cysteate/hydrogen sulfide	pyridoxal phosphate/sulfite
cystathionine γ-lyase	→	pyruvate/NH_{3}/H_{2}S	pyridoxal phosphate
cysteine—tRNA ligase	→	L-cysteinyl-tRNA^{Cys}	
cystine reductase	→	L-cystine/NADH and H+	NAD+
cysteine transaminase	→	3-mercapto-pyruvate/L-glutamate	pyridoxal phosphate/alpha-ketoglutaric acid
glutamate–cysteine ligase	→	γ-glutamyl cysteine/ADP and P_{i}	ATP

L-Cysteine is the product of several processes as well. In addition to the reactions below, L-cysteine is also a product of glycine, serine, and threonine metabolism.

L-cysteine production pathways
Reactants	→	Enzyme	Cofactors	Notes
O-acetyl-L-serine/hydrogen sulfide	→	cysteine synthase	pyridoxal phosphate	not present in humans
L-cystine/2 glutathione	→	glutathione-cystine transhydrogenase		
cystathionine	→	cystathionine γ-lyase	pyridoxal phosphate	
3-mercapto-pyruvate	→	cysteine transaminase	pyridoxal phosphate	

== See also ==
- D-cysteine desulfhydrase
- Sulfur metabolism
