= O-Acetylserine =

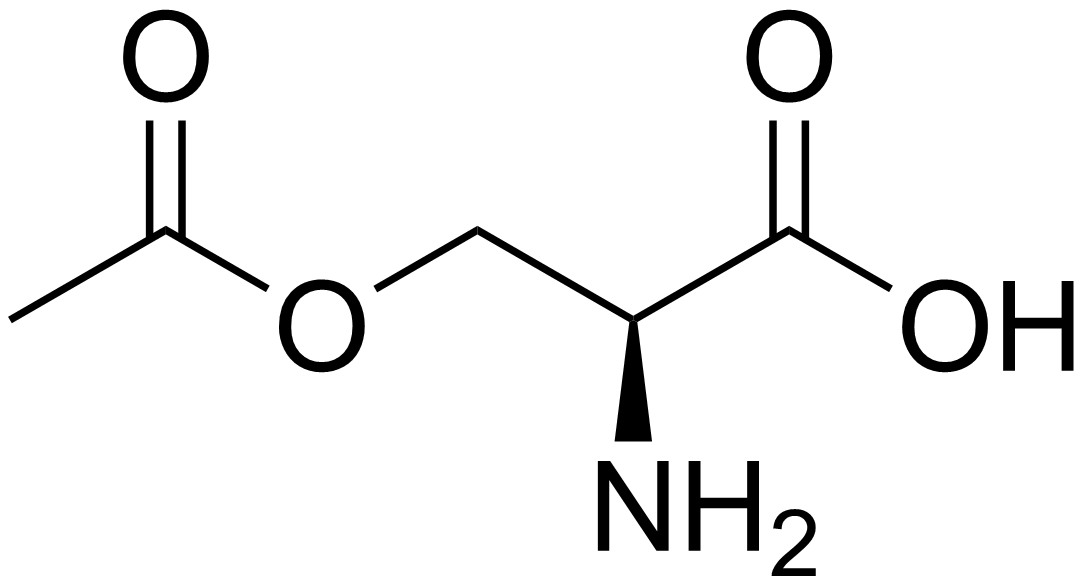

Names
- IUPAC name O-Acetyl-L-serine
- Systematic IUPAC name (2S)-3-(Acetyloxy)-2-aminopropanoic acid

Identifiers
CAS Number	5147-00-2; 66638-22-0 (HCl)
3D model (JSmol)	Interactive image
ChEBI	CHEBI:17981
ChemSpider	184
DrugBank	DB01837
PubChem CID	189
UNII	G05L7T7ZEQ
CompTox Dashboard (EPA)	DTXSID20904718
- InChI: InChI=1S/C5H9NO4/c1-3(7)10-2-4(6)5(8)9/h4H,2,6H2,1H3,(H,8,9) Key: VZXPDPZARILFQX-UHFFFAOYSA-N; InChI=1/C5H9NO4/c1-3(7)10-2-4(6)5(8)9/h4H,2,6H2,1H3,(H,8,9) Key: VZXPDPZARILFQX-UHFFFAOYAG
- SMILES: O=C(OCC(N)C(=O)O)C

Properties
Chemical formula	C_{5}H_{9}NO_{4}
Molar mass	147.13
- Except where otherwise noted, data are given for materials in their standard state (at 25 °C [77 °F], 100 kPa). verify (what is ?) Infobox references

O-Acetylserine is an α-amino acid with the chemical formula HO_{2}CCH(NH_{2})CH_{2}OC(O)CH_{3}. It is an intermediate in the biosynthesis of the common amino acid cysteine in bacteria and plants. O-Acetylserine is biosynthesized by acetylation of the serine by the enzyme serine transacetylase. The enzyme O-acetylserine (thiol)-lyase, using sulfide sources, converts this ester into cysteine, releasing acetate:

HO_{2}CCH(NH_{2})CH_{2}OH → HO_{2}CCH(NH_{2})CH_{2}OC(O)CH_{3}
HO_{2}CCH(NH_{2})CH_{2}OC(O)CH_{3} → HO_{2}CCH(NH_{2})CH_{2}SH
