= Cysteine =

Proteinogenic amino acid

l-Cysteine
- Skeletal formula of L-cysteine

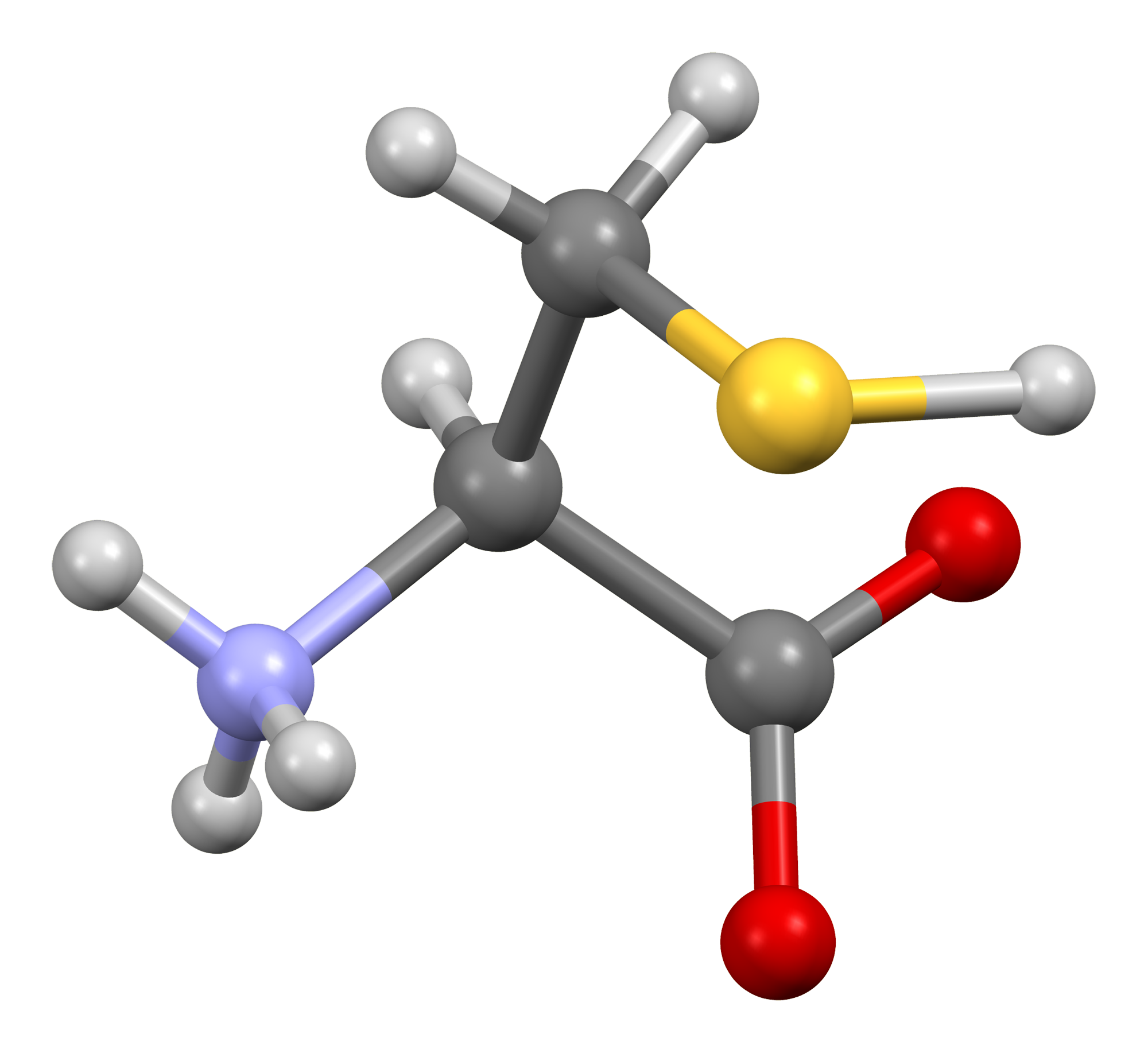
Ball-and-stick model
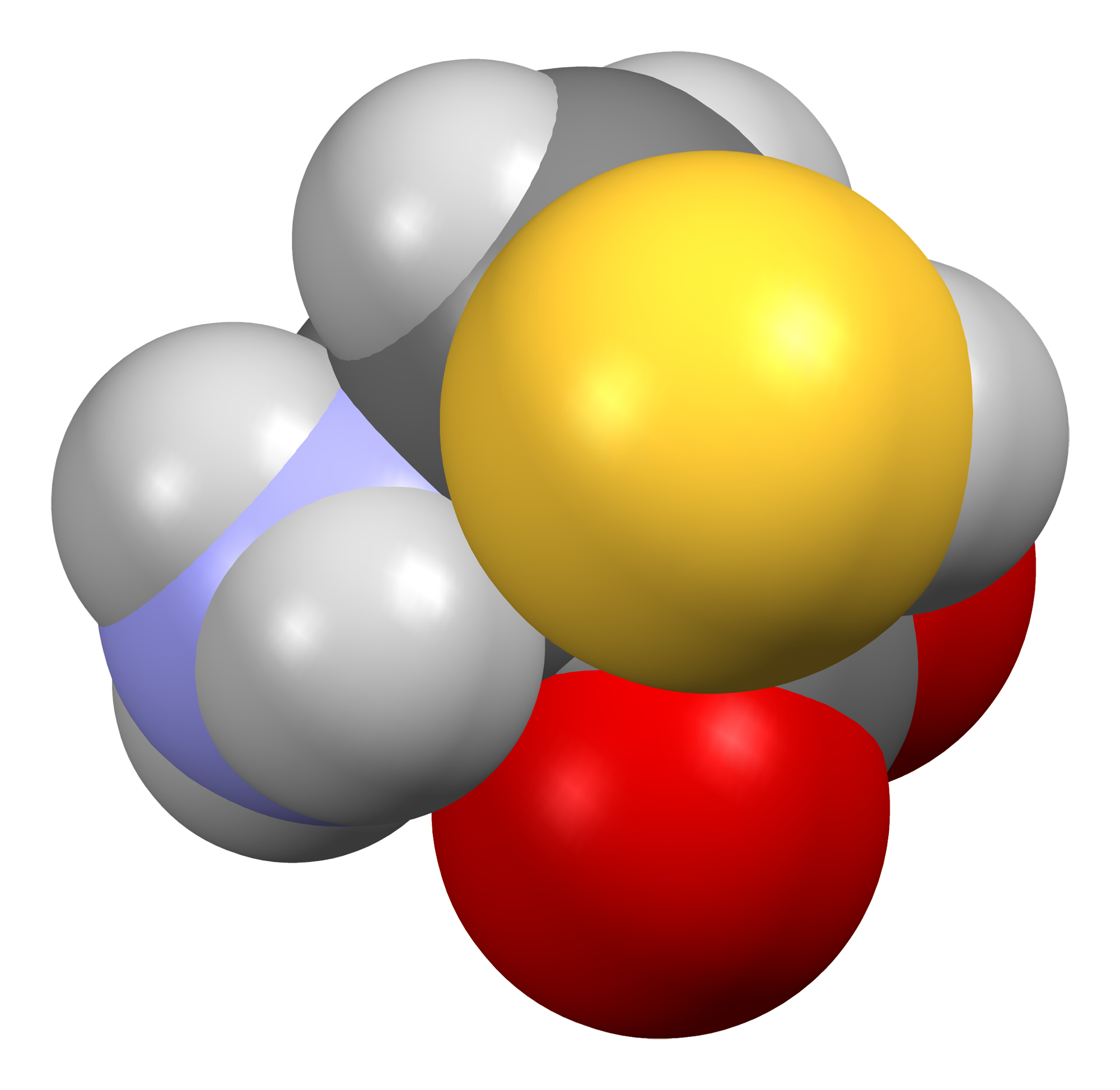
Space-filling model

Names
- IUPAC name Cysteine
- Systematic IUPAC name 2-Amino-3-sulfanylpropanoic acid
- Other names: 2-Amino-3-sulfhydrylpropanoic acid; 2-Amino-3-mercaptopropanoic acid

Identifiers
CAS Number	52-90-4; 52-89-1 (hydrochloride); 921-01-7 D-cysteine
3D model (JSmol)	Interactive image; Zwitterion: Interactive image
Abbreviations	Cys, C
ChEBI	CHEBI:15356
ChEMBL	ChEMBL54943
ChemSpider	574 (Racemic); 5653 (L-form)
ECHA InfoCard	100.000.145
EC Number	200-158-2
E number	E920 (glazing agents, ...)
IUPHAR/BPS	4782
KEGG	D00026
PubChem CID	5862
UNII	K848JZ4886; A9U1687S1S (hydrochloride)
CompTox Dashboard (EPA)	DTXSID8022876
- InChI: InChI=1S/C3H7NO2S/c4-2(1-7)3(5)6/h2,7H,1,4H2,(H,5,6) Key: XUJNEKJLAYXESH-UHFFFAOYSA-N; InChI=1/C3H7NO2S/c4-2(1-7)3(5)6/h2,7H,1,4H2,(H,5,6)/t2-/m0/s1 Key: XUJNEKJLAYXESH-REOHCLBHBU; InChI=1/C3H7NO2S/c4-2(1-7)3(5)6/h2,7H,1,4H2,(H,5,6) Key: XUJNEKJLAYXESH-UHFFFAOYAC
- SMILES: C([C@@H](C(=O)O)N)S; Zwitterion: C([C@@H](C(=O)[O-])[NH3+])S

Properties
Chemical formula	C_{3}H_{7}NO_{2}S
Molar mass	121.15 g·mol^{−1}
Appearance	white crystals or powder
Melting point	240 °C (464 °F; 513 K) decomposes
Solubility in water	277g/L (at 25 °C)
Solubility	1.5g/100g ethanol 19 °C
Acidity (pK_{a})	1.71 (conjugate acid), 8.33 (thiol), 10.78
Chiral rotation ([α]_{D})	+9.4° (H_{2}O, c = 1.3)

Supplementary data page
- Cysteine (data page)
- Except where otherwise noted, data are given for materials in their standard state (at 25 °C [77 °F], 100 kPa). verify (what is ?) Infobox references

L-Cysteine ball and stick model spinning

Cysteine (/ˈsɪstɪiːn/; symbol Cys or C) is a semiessential proteinogenic amino acid with the formula HS−CH_{2}−CH(NH_{2})−COOH. The thiol side chain in cysteine enables the formation of disulfide bonds, and often participates in enzymatic reactions as a nucleophile. Cysteine is chiral, but both D- and L-cysteine are found in nature. L‑Cysteine is a protein monomer in all biota, and D-cysteine acts as a signaling molecule in mammalian nervous systems. Cysteine is named after its discovery in urine, which comes from the urinary bladder or cyst, from Greek κύστις kýstis, "bladder".

The thiol is susceptible to oxidation to give the disulfide derivative cystine, which serves an important structural role in many proteins. In this case, the symbol Cyx is sometimes used. The deprotonated form can generally be described by the symbol Cym as well.

When used as a food additive, cysteine has the E number E920.

Cysteine is encoded by the codons UGU and UGC.

== Structure ==
Like other amino acids (not as a residue of a protein), cysteine exists as a zwitterion. Cysteine has l chirality in the older d/l notation based on homology to d- and l-glyceraldehyde. In the newer R/S system of designating chirality, based on the atomic numbers of atoms near the asymmetric carbon, cysteine (and selenocysteine) have R chirality, because of the presence of sulfur (or selenium) as a second neighbor to the asymmetric carbon atom. The remaining chiral amino acids, having lighter atoms in that position, have S chirality. Replacing sulfur with selenium gives selenocysteine.

(R)-Cysteine (left) and (S)-Cysteine (right) in zwitterionic form at neutral pH

== Dietary sources ==
Some foods considered rich in cysteine include poultry, eggs, beef, and whole grains. In high-protein diets, cysteine may be partially responsible for reduced blood pressure and stroke risk. Although classified as a nonessential amino acid, in rare cases, cysteine may be essential for infants, the elderly, and individuals with certain metabolic diseases or who suffer from malabsorption syndromes. Cysteine can usually be synthesized by the human body under normal physiological conditions if a sufficient quantity of methionine is available through the transsulfuration pathway.

== Industrial sources ==
The majority of l-cysteine is obtained industrially by hydrolysis of animal materials, such as poultry feathers or hog hair. Despite widespread rumor, human hair is rarely a source material. Indeed, food additive or cosmetic product manufactures may not legally source from human hair in the European Union.

Some animal-originating sources of l-cysteine as a food additive contravene kosher, halal, vegan, or vegetarian diets. To avoid this problem, synthetic l-cysteine, compliant with Jewish kosher and Muslim halal laws, is also available, albeit at a higher price. The typical synthetic route involves fermentation with an artificial E. coli strain.

Alternatively, Evonik (formerly Degussa) introduced a route from substituted thiazolines. Pseudomonas thiazolinophilum hydrolyzes racemic 2‑amino-Δ^{2}‑thiazoline-4‑carboxylic acid to l‑cysteine.

== Biosynthesis ==
Cysteine synthesis: Cystathionine beta synthase catalyzes the upper reaction and cystathionine gamma-lyase catalyzes the lower reaction.

In animals, biosynthesis begins with the amino acid serine. The sulfur is derived from methionine, which is converted to homocysteine through the intermediate S-adenosylmethionine. Cystathionine beta-synthase then combines homocysteine and serine to form the asymmetrical thioether cystathionine. The enzyme cystathionine gamma-lyase converts the cystathionine into cysteine and alpha-ketobutyrate. This pathway is called the transsulfuration pathway. In plants and bacteria, cysteine biosynthesis also starts from serine, which is converted to O-acetylserine by the enzyme serine transacetylase. The enzyme cysteine synthase, using sulfide sources, converts this ester into cysteine, releasing acetate.

== Biological functions ==
The cysteine thiol group is nucleophilic and easily oxidized. The reactivity is enhanced when the thiol is ionized, and cysteine residues in proteins have pK_{a} values close to neutrality, so are often in their reactive thiolate form in the cell. Because of its high reactivity, the thiol group of cysteine has numerous biological functions.

The thiol group in proteins can usually be oxidized in the following ways, where GSH is glutathione, GSSG is glutathione disulfide, RSH is a protein containing a thiol group with R being the protein residue.

2 RSH → RSSR + 2 H^{+} + 2 e^{−}

Disulfide formation stabilizes protein folded structure. Reduction of disulfinide protein can be done by thioredoxin or thioredoxin reductase. It is common in secreted and membrane proteins that require a certain mechanical property to function, such as keratin. It is used for protein regulation, such as in the ferredoxin-thioredoxin system.

RSH + GSSG ⇌ RSSG + GSH

Glutathionylation is common in the cytosol and mitochondria. It can protect the reactive thiol, and it also can perform post-translational regulation of the protein. Reduction of glutathionylated protein can be done by GSH or glutaredoxin.

RSH + H_{2}O_{2} → RSOH + H_{2}O

Sulfenylation is common in redox signalling. It is a reversible with peroxiredoxins.

RSOH + H_{2}O_{2} → RSO_{2}H + H_{2}O

Sulfinylation is further oxidation, also common in redox signalling. It is reversible with sulfiredoxins.

RSO_{2}H + H_{2}O_{2} → RSO_{3}H + H_{2}O

Sulfonylation is an irreversible oxidation. It is often associated with the sulfonylation or sulfoconjugation of steroidal hormones.

=== Precursor to the antioxidant glutathione ===
Due to the ability of thiols to undergo redox reactions, cysteine and cysteinyl residues have antioxidant properties. Its antioxidant properties are typically expressed in the tripeptide glutathione, which occurs in humans and other organisms. The systemic availability of oral glutathione (GSH) is negligible; so it must be biosynthesized from its constituent amino acids, cysteine, glycine, and glutamic acid. While glutamic acid is usually sufficient because amino acid nitrogen is recycled through glutamate as an intermediary, dietary cysteine and glycine supplementation can improve synthesis of glutathione.

=== Precursor to iron-sulfur clusters ===
Cysteine is an important source of sulfide in human metabolism. The sulfide in iron-sulfur clusters and in nitrogenase is extracted from cysteine, which is converted to alanine in the process.

=== Metal ion binding ===
Beyond the iron-sulfur proteins, many other metal cofactors in enzymes are bound to the thiolate substituent of cysteinyl residues. Examples include zinc in zinc fingers and alcohol dehydrogenase, copper in the blue copper proteins, iron in cytochrome P450, and nickel in the [NiFe]-hydrogenases. The thiol group also has a high affinity for heavy metals, so that proteins containing cysteine, such as metallothionein, will bind metals such as mercury, lead, and cadmium tightly. Silver ions can also bind tightly to cysteine and cause secondary structure changes in cysteine-containing peptides, e.g. leading to alpha helix formation. This is also the case for zinc fingers in which silver ions can replace zinc and form stable zinc/cysteine clusters with partial alpha helical structure. The extent of alpha helix formation increases with the number of cysteines.

=== Roles in protein structure ===
In the translation of messenger RNA molecules to produce polypeptides, cysteine is coded for by the UGU and UGC codons.

Cysteine has traditionally been considered to be a hydrophilic amino acid, based largely on the chemical parallel between its thiol group and the hydroxyl groups in the side chains of other polar amino acids. However, the cysteine side chain has been shown to stabilize hydrophobic interactions in micelles to a greater degree than the side chain in the nonpolar amino acid glycine and the polar amino acid serine. In a statistical analysis of the frequency with which amino acids appear in various proteins, cysteine residues were found to associate with hydrophobic regions of proteins. Their hydrophobic tendency was equivalent to that of known nonpolar amino acids such as methionine and tyrosine (tyrosine is polar aromatic but also hydrophobic), those of which were much greater than that of known polar amino acids such as serine and threonine. Hydrophobicity scales, which rank amino acids from most hydrophobic to most hydrophilic, consistently place cysteine towards the hydrophobic end of the spectrum, even when they are based on methods that are not influenced by the tendency of cysteines to form disulfide bonds in proteins. Therefore, cysteine is now often grouped among the hydrophobic amino acids, though it is sometimes also classified as slightly polar, or polar.

Most cysteine residues are covalently bonded to other cysteine residues to form disulfide bonds, which play an important role in the folding and stability of some proteins, usually proteins secreted to the extracellular medium. Since most cellular compartments are reducing environments, disulfide bonds are generally unstable in the cytosol with some exceptions as noted below.

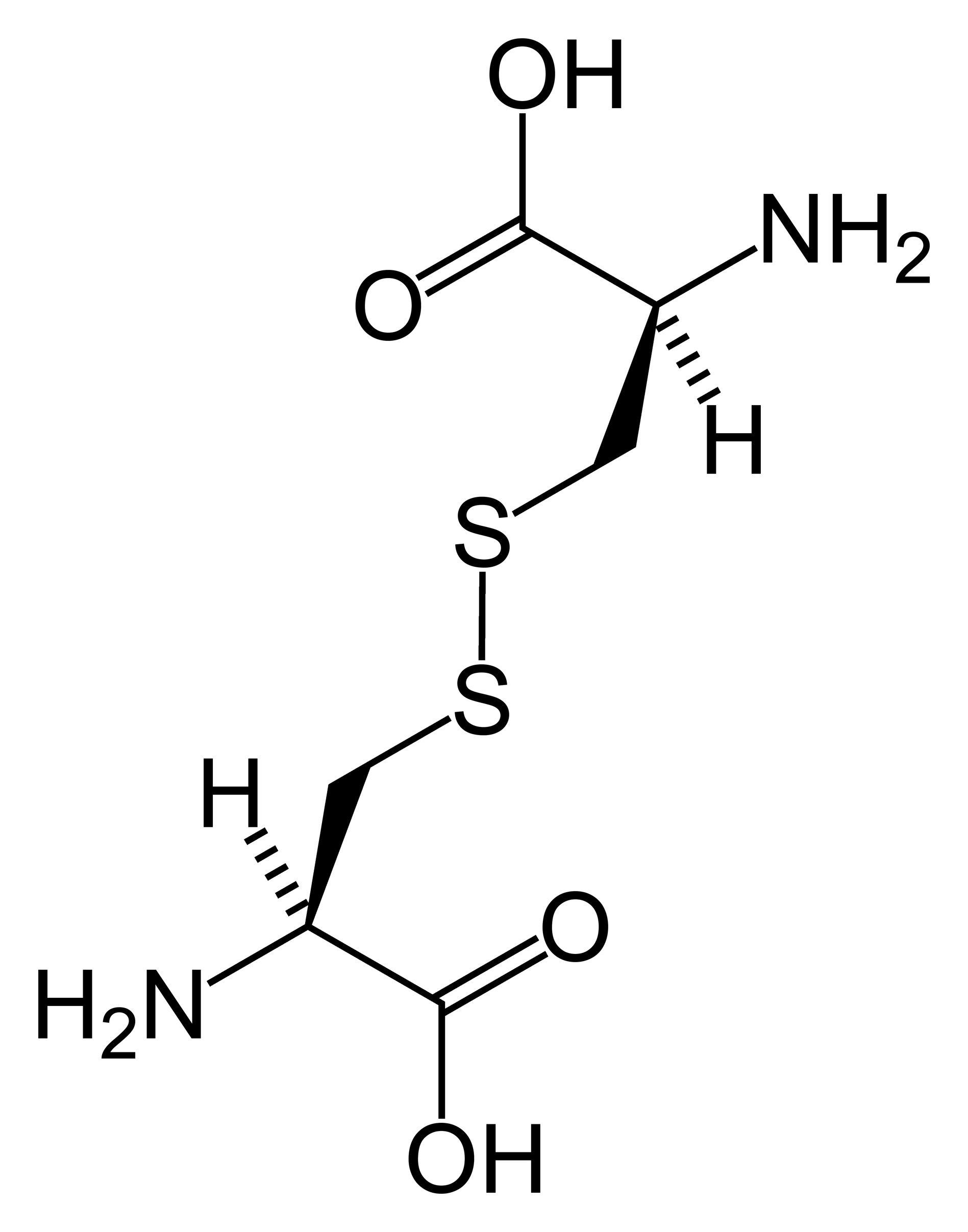
Figure 2: Cystine (shown here in its neutral form), two cysteines bound together by a disulfide bond

Disulfide bonds in proteins are formed by oxidation of the thiol group of cysteine residues. The other sulfur-containing amino acid, methionine, cannot form disulfide bonds. More aggressive oxidants convert cysteine to the corresponding sulfinic acid and sulfonic acid. Cysteine residues play a valuable role by crosslinking proteins, which increases the rigidity of proteins and also functions to confer proteolytic resistance (since protein export is a costly process, minimizing its necessity is advantageous). Inside the cell, disulfide bridges between cysteine residues within a polypeptide support the protein's tertiary structure. Insulin is an example of a protein with cystine crosslinking, wherein two separate peptide chains are connected by a pair of disulfide bonds.

Protein disulfide isomerases catalyze the proper formation of disulfide bonds; the cell transfers dehydroascorbic acid to the endoplasmic reticulum, which oxidizes the environment. In this environment, cysteines are, in general, oxidized to cystine and are no longer functional as a nucleophiles.

Aside from its oxidation to cystine, cysteine participates in numerous post-translational modifications. The nucleophilic thiol group allows cysteine to conjugate to other groups, e.g., in prenylation. Ubiquitin ligases transfer ubiquitin to its pendant, proteins, and caspases, which engage in proteolysis in the apoptotic cycle. Inteins often function with the help of a catalytic cysteine. These roles are typically limited to the intracellular milieu, where the environment is reducing, and cysteine is not oxidized to cystine.

== Evolutionary role of cysteine ==
Cysteine is considered a "newcomer" amino acid and it has been suggested to be the 17th amino acid to be incorporated into the genetic code. Similar to other later-added amino acids such as methionine, tyrosine, and tryptophan, cysteine exhibits strong nucleophilic and redox-active properties. These properties contribute to the depletion of cysteine from respiratory chain complexes, such as Complexes I and IV, since reactive oxygen species (ROS) produced by the respiratory chain can react with the cysteine residues in these complexes, leading to dysfunctional proteins and potentially contributing to aging. The primary response of a protein to ROS is the oxidation of cysteine and the loss of free thiol groups, resulting in increased thiyl radicals and associated protein cross-linking. In contrast, another sulfur-containing, redox-active amino acid, methionine, does not exhibit these biochemical properties and its content is relatively upregulated in mitochondrially encoded proteins.

== Applications ==
Cysteine, mainly the l-enantiomer, is a precursor in the food, pharmaceutical, and personal-care industries. One of the largest applications is the production of flavors. For example, the reaction of cysteine with sugars in a Maillard reaction yields meat flavors. l-Cysteine is also used as a processing aid for baking.

In the field of personal care, cysteine is used for permanent-wave applications, predominantly in Asia. Again, the cysteine is used for breaking up the disulfide bonds in the hair's keratin.

Cysteine is a very popular target for site-directed labeling experiments to investigate biomolecular structure and dynamics. Maleimides selectively attach to cysteine using a covalent Michael addition. Site-directed spin labeling for EPR or paramagnetic relaxation-enhanced NMR also uses cysteine extensively.

=== Reducing toxic effects of alcohol ===
Cysteine has been proposed as a preventive or antidote for some of the negative effects of alcohol, including liver damage and hangover. It counteracts the poisonous effects of acetaldehyde. It binds to acetaldehyde to form the low-toxicity heterocycle methylthioproline.

In a rat study, test animals received an LD_{90} dose of acetaldehyde. Those that received cysteine had an 80% survival rate; when both cysteine and thiamine were administered, all animals survived. The control group had a 10% survival rate.

In 2020 an article was published that suggests L-cysteine might also work in humans.

=== N-Acetylcysteine ===
N-Acetyl-l-cysteine is a derivative of cysteine wherein an acetyl group is attached to the nitrogen atom. This compound is sold as a dietary supplement, and used as an antidote in cases of acetaminophen overdose.

=== D-ribose L-cysteine ===
D-ribose-L-cysteine (riboceine) is a chemical compound developed as a cysteine prodrug intended to increase endogenous production of glutathione, a naturally occurring intracellular antioxidant. Structurally, it consists of D-ribose, a pentose sugar involved in cellular energy metabolism, chemically bound to L-cysteine, an amino acid required for glutathione biosynthesis.

=== Sheep ===
Cysteine is required by sheep to produce wool. It is an essential amino acid that is taken in from their feed. As a consequence, during drought conditions, sheep produce less wool; however, transgenic sheep that can make their own cysteine have been developed.

== Chemical reactions ==
Being multifunctional, cysteine undergoes a variety of reactions. Much attention has focused on protecting the thiol group. Methylation of cysteine gives S-methylcysteine. Treatment with formaldehyde gives the thiazolidine thioproline. With phosgene and related carbonylating agents, cysteine gives procysteine.

Cysteine forms a variety of coordination complexes upon treatment with metal ions. This coordination behavior is seen in many metal-cysteine metalloenzymes.

== Safety ==
Relative to most other amino acids, cysteine is much more toxic.

== History ==
In 1884 German chemist Eugen Baumann found that reduction of cystine with zinc gave monomer, which he named "cysteïne". The easy redox interconversion of cysteine and cystine has "provided more puzzles to protein chemists than any of the other amino acids".

== See also ==
- Amino acids
- Cysteine metabolism
- Cystinuria
- Saville reaction
- Sullivan reaction
