= BZIP domain =

Protein domain

bZIP transcription factor
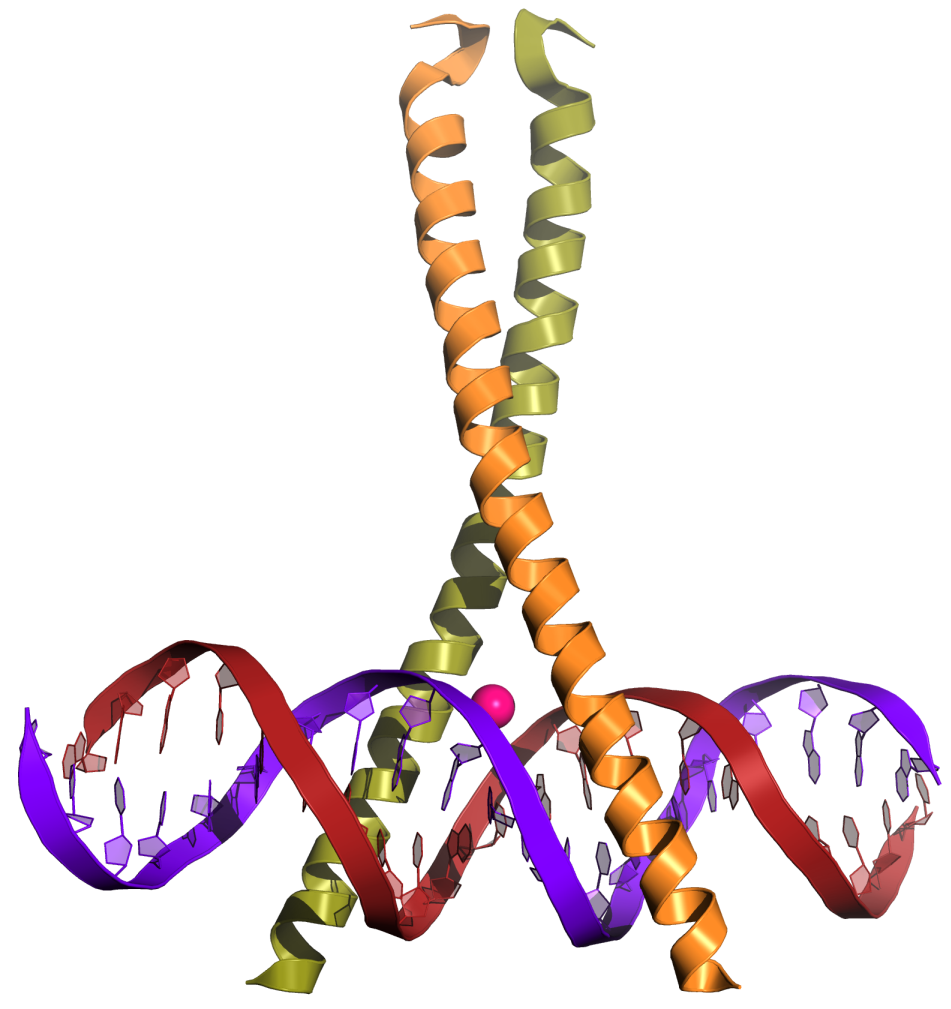
- CREB (top) is a transcription factor capable of binding DNA via the bZIP domain (bottom) and regulating gene expression.

Identifiers
- Symbol: bZIP_1
- Pfam: PF00170
- InterPro: IPR011616
- PROSITE: PDOC00036
- SCOP2: 1ysa / SCOPe / SUPFAM
- CDD: cd14686
- Membranome: 235
Available protein structures:
- PDB: IPR011616 PF00170 (ECOD; PDBsum)
- AlphaFold: IPR011616; PF00170

The Basic Leucine Zipper Domain (bZIP domain) is found in many DNA binding eukaryotic proteins. One part of the domain contains a region that mediates sequence specific DNA binding properties and the leucine zipper that is required to hold together (dimerize) two DNA binding regions. The DNA binding region comprises a number of basic amino acids such as arginine and lysine. Proteins containing this domain are transcription factors.

== bZIP transcription factors ==
bZIP transcription factors are found in all eukaryotes and form one of the largest families of dimerizing TFs. An evolutionary study from 2008 revealed that 4 bZIP genes were encoded by the genome of the most recent common ancestor of all plants. Interactions between bZIP transcription factors are numerous and complex and play important roles in cancer development in epithelial tissues, steroid hormone synthesis by cells of endocrine tissues, factors affecting reproductive functions, and several other phenomena that affect human health.

== bZIP domain containing proteins ==
- AP-1 fos/jun heterodimer that forms a transcription factor
- Jun-B transcription factor
- CREB cAMP response element transcription factor
- OPAQUE2 (O2) transcription factor of the 22-kD zein gene that encodes a class of storage proteins in the endosperm of maize (Zea mays) kernels
- NFE2L2 or Nrf2
- Bzip Maf transcription factors

== Human proteins containing this domain ==
ATF1; ATF2; ATF4; ATF5; ATF6; ATF7; BACH1; BACH2; BATF; BATF2; CEBPA; CEBPB; CEBPD; CEBPE; CEBPG; CEBPZ; CREB1; CREB3; CREB3L1; CREB3L2; CREB3L3; CREB3L4; CREB5; CREBL1; CREM; E4BP4; FOSL1; FOSL2; JUN; JUNB; JUND; MAFA; MAFB; MAFF; MAFG; NRL; C-MAF; MAFK; NFE2; NFE2L2; NFE2L3; SNFT; XBP1
