= MAFF (gene) =

Protein-coding gene

Identifiers
- Aliases: MAFF, U-MAF, hMafF, MAF bZIP transcription factor F
- External IDs: OMIM: 604877; MGI: 96910; GeneCards: MAFF

Gene location (Human)
Chr.	Chromosome 22 (human)
Band	22q13.1	Start	38,200,767 bp
Band	22q13.1	End	38,216,507 bp

Gene location (Mouse)
Chr.	Chromosome 15 (mouse)
Band	15 E1|15 37.7 cM	Start	79,230,821 bp
Band	15 E1|15 37.7 cM	End	79,243,276 bp
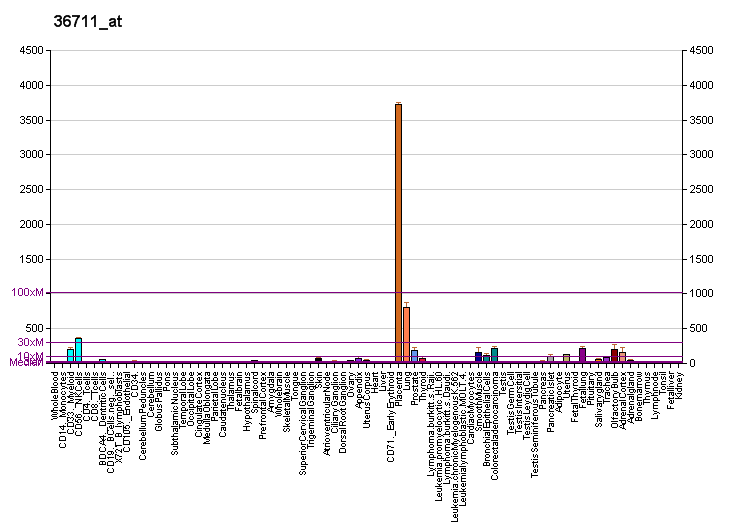

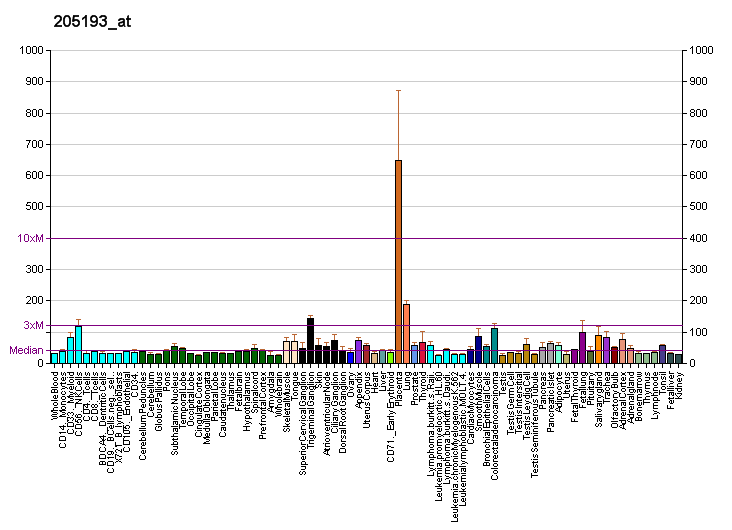
RNA expression pattern
Bgee	Human / Mouse (ortholog); Top expressed in: amniotic fluid; mucosa of paranasal sinus; mucosa of urinary bladder; cartilage tissue; pericardium; vena cava; pancreatic ductal cell; buccal mucosa cell; parotid gland; saphenous vein / Top expressed in: aortic valve; decidua; ascending aorta; endothelial cell of lymphatic vessel; female urethra; esophagus; lip; yolk sac; left lung lobe; tail of embryo; More reference expression data
BioGPS	More reference expression data
Gene ontology
Molecular function	DNA-binding transcription factor activity; DNA binding; DNA-binding transcription activator activity, RNA polymerase II-specific; sequence-specific DNA binding; protein binding; DNA-binding transcription factor activity, RNA polymerase II-specific; RNA polymerase II cis-regulatory region sequence-specific DNA binding
Cellular component	mitochondrion; nucleoplasm; nucleus
Biological process	skeletal muscle cell differentiation; regulation of epidermal cell differentiation; blood coagulation; in utero embryonic development; regulation of transcription, DNA-templated; transcription by RNA polymerase II; birth; transcription, DNA-templated; positive regulation of transcription by RNA polymerase II
Sources:Amigo / QuickGO
Orthologs
Databases	NCBI: entry; OMA: entry
Species	Human	Mouse
Entrez	23764	17133
Ensembl	ENSG00000185022	ENSMUSG00000042622
UniProt	Q9ULX9	O54791
RefSeq (mRNA)	NM_152878; NM_001161572; NM_001161573; NM_001161574; NM_012323	NM_010755; NM_001304830; NM_001304831; NM_001304832
RefSeq (protein)	NP_001155044; NP_001155045; NP_001155046; NP_036455	NP_001291759; NP_001291760; NP_001291761; NP_034885
Location (UCSC)	Chr 22: 38.2 – 38.22 Mb	Chr 15: 79.23 – 79.24 Mb
PubMed search
- Wikidata
View/Edit Human	View/Edit Mouse

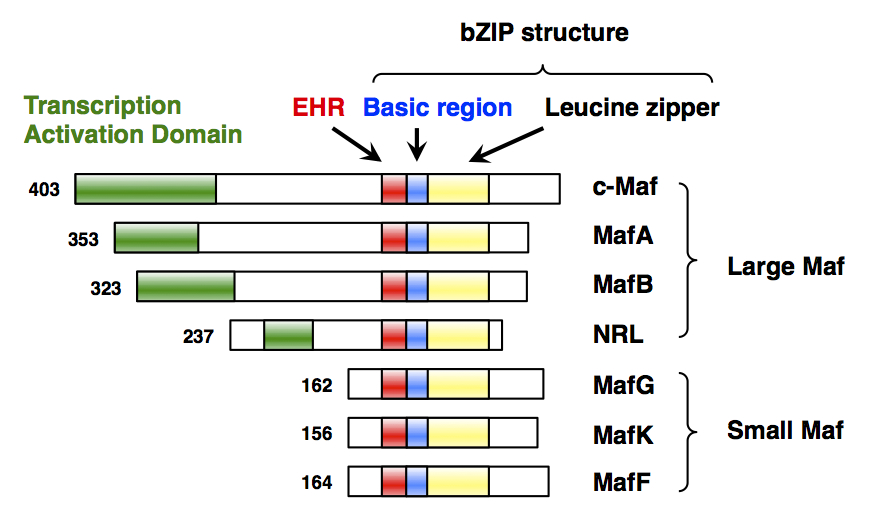
Structures of the Maf family proteins.

Transcription factor MafF is a bZip Maf transcription factor protein that in humans is encoded by the MAFF gene.

MafF is one of the small Maf proteins, which are basic region and leucine zipper (bZIP)-type transcription factors. The HUGO Gene Nomenclature Committee-approved gene name of MAFF is “v-maf avian musculoaponeurotic fibrosarcoma oncogene homolog F”.

== Discovery ==
MafF was first cloned and identified in chicken in 1993 as a member of the small Maf (sMaf) genes. MAFF has been identified in many vertebrates, including humans. There are three functionally redundant sMaf proteins in vertebrates, MafF, MafG, and MafK.

== Structure ==
MafF has a bZIP structure that consists of a basic region for DNA binding and a leucine zipper structure for dimer formation. Similar to other sMafs, MafF lacks any canonical transcriptional activation domains.

== Expression ==
MAFF is broadly but differentially expressed in various tissues. MAFF expression was detected in all 16 tissues examined by the human BodyMap Project, but relatively abundant in adipose, colon, lung, prostate and skeletal muscle tissues. Human MAFF gene is induced by proinflammatory cytokines, interleukin 1 beta and tumor necrosis factor in myometrial cells.

== Function ==
Because of sequence similarity, no functional differences have been observed among the sMafs in terms of their bZIP structures. sMafs form homodimers by themselves and heterodimers with other specific bZIP transcription factors, such as CNC (cap 'n' collar) proteins [p45 NF-E2 (NFE2), Nrf1 (NFE2L1), Nrf2 (NFE2L2), and Nrf3 (NFE2L3)] and Bach proteins (BACH1 and BACH2).

== Target genes ==
sMafs regulate different target genes depending on their partners. For instance, the p45-NF-E2-sMaf heterodimer regulate genes responsible for platelet production. Nrf2-sMaf heterodimer regulates a battery of cytoprotective genes, such as antioxidant/xenobiotic metabolizing enzyme genes. The Bach1-sMaf heterodimer regulates the heme oxygenase-1 gene. In particular, it has been reported that MafF regulates the oxytocin receptor gene. The contribution of individual sMafs to the transcriptional regulation of their target genes has not yet been well examined.

== Disease linkage ==
Loss of sMafs results in disease-like phenotypes as summarized in table below. Mice lacking MafF are seemingly healthy under laboratory conditions. However, mice lacking MafG exhibit mild neuronal phenotype and mild thrombocytopenia, mice lacking Mafg and one allele of Mafk (Mafg^{−/−}::Mafk^{+/−}) exhibit progressive neuronal degeneration, thrombocytopenia and cataract, and mice lacking MafG and MafK (Mafg^{−/−}::Mafk^{−/−}) exhibit more severe neuronal degeneration and die in the perinatal stage. Mice lacking MafF, MafG and MafK are embryonic lethal, demonstrating that MafF is indispensable for embryonic development. Embryonic fibroblasts that are derived from Maff^{−/−}::Mafg^{-/−}::Mafk^{−/−} mice fail to activate Nrf2-dependent cytoprotective genes in response to stress.

Genotype			Mouse Phenotype
Maff	Mafg	Mafk	Mouse Phenotype
−/−			No apparent phenotype under laboratory conditions
	−/−		Mild motor ataxia, mild thrombocytopenia
	−/−	+/−	Severe motor ataxia, progressive neuronal degeneration, severe thrombocytopenia, and cataract
	−/−	−/−	More severe neuronal phenotypes, and perinatal lethal
−/−	+/−	−/−	No severe abnormality (Fertile)
−/−	−/−	−/−	Growth retardation, fetal liver hypoplasia, and lethal around embryonic day, 13.5
+/− (heterozygote), −/− (homozygote), blank (wild-type)

In addition, accumulating evidence suggests that as partners of CNC and Bach proteins, sMafs are involved in the onset and progression of various human diseases, including neurodegeneration, arteriosclerosis and cancer.

== See also ==
- MAF (gene)
