= MAFG =

Protein-coding gene in the species Homo sapiens

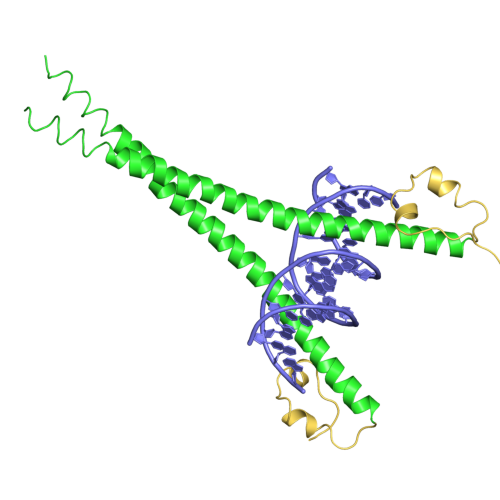

Identifiers
- Aliases: MAFG, hMAF, MAF bZIP transcription factor G
- External IDs: OMIM: 602020; MGI: 96911; GeneCards: MAFG
Available structures
| PDB | Ortholog search: PDBe RCSB |
| PDB | List of PDB id codes 1K1V, 3A5T |

Gene location (Human)
| Chr. | Chromosome 17 (human) |
| Band | 17q25.3 | Start | 81,918,270 bp |
| Band | 17q25.3 | End | 81,927,735 bp |

Gene location (Mouse)
| Chr. | Chromosome 11 (mouse) |
| Band | 11 E2|11 84.35 cM | Start | 120,515,943 bp |
| Band | 11 E2|11 84.35 cM | End | 120,524,426 bp |
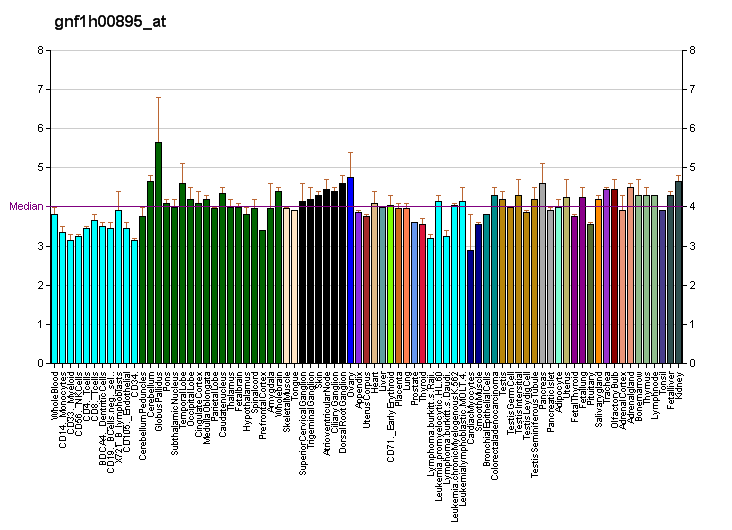

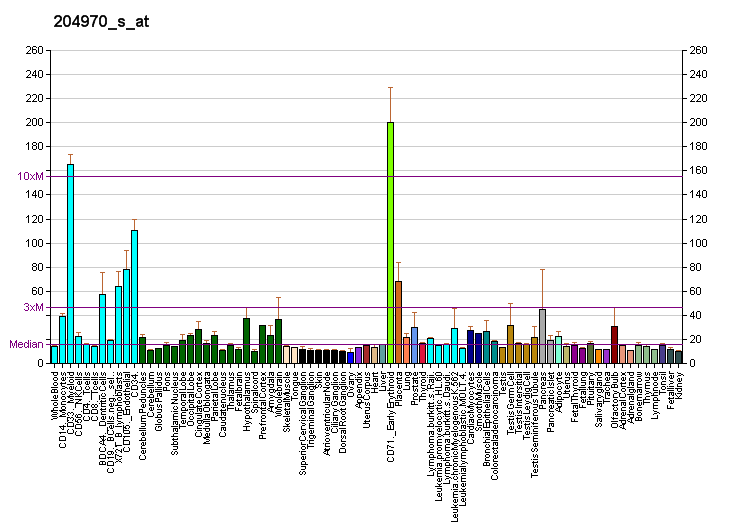
RNA expression pattern
| Bgee | Human / Mouse (ortholog); Top expressed in: secondary oocyte; pars compacta; dorsal motor nucleus of vagus nerve; pars reticulata; amniotic fluid; nipple; ventral tegmental area; middle temporal gyrus; pons; superior vestibular nucleus / Top expressed in: granulocyte; muscle of thigh; stroma of bone marrow; neural layer of retina; fetal liver hematopoietic progenitor cell; right kidney; lens; lip; yolk sac; superior frontal gyrus; More reference expression data |
| BioGPS | More reference expression data |
Gene ontology
| Molecular function | DNA-binding transcription factor activity; DNA binding; protein binding; protein heterodimerization activity; RNA polymerase II cis-regulatory region sequence-specific DNA binding; DNA-binding transcription activator activity, RNA polymerase II-specific; DNA-binding transcription factor activity, RNA polymerase II-specific; sequence-specific DNA binding |
| Cellular component | nucleoplasm; nucleus |
| Biological process | regulation of epidermal cell differentiation; positive regulation of gene expression; adult behavior; blood coagulation; in utero embryonic development; regulation of cell population proliferation; regulation of cellular pH; regulation of transcription, DNA-templated; transcription, DNA-templated; transcription by RNA polymerase II; positive regulation of transcription by RNA polymerase II |
Sources:Amigo / QuickGO
Orthologs
| Databases | NCBI: entry; OMA: entry |
| Species | Human | Mouse |
| Entrez | 4097 | 17134 |
| Ensembl | ENSG00000197063 | ENSMUSG00000051510 |
| UniProt | O15525 | O54790 |
| RefSeq (mRNA) | NM_002359; NM_032711 | NM_010756 |
| RefSeq (protein) | NP_002350; NP_116100 | NP_034886 |
| Location (UCSC) | Chr 17: 81.92 – 81.93 Mb | Chr 11: 120.52 – 120.52 Mb |
| PubMed search |
- Wikidata
| View/Edit Human | View/Edit Mouse |

Transcription factor MafG is a bZip Maf transcription factor protein that in humans is encoded by the MAFG gene.

MafG is one of the small Maf proteins, which are basic region and leucine zipper (bZIP)-type transcription factors. The HUGO Gene Nomenclature Committee-approved gene name of MAFG is “v-maf avian musculoaponeurotic fibrosarcoma oncogene homolog G”.

== Discovery ==
MafG was first cloned and identified in chicken in 1995 as a new member of the small Maf (sMaf) genes. MAFG has been identified in many vertebrates, including humans. There are three functionally redundant sMaf proteins in vertebrates, MafF, MafG, and MafK.

== Structure ==
MafG has a bZIP structure that consists of a basic region for DNA binding and a leucine zipper structure for dimer formation. Similar to other sMafs, MafG lacks any canonical transcriptional activation domains.

== Expression ==
MAFG is broadly but differentially expressed in various tissues. MAFG expression was detected in all 16 tissues examined by the human BodyMap Project, but relatively abundant in lung, lymph node, skeletal muscle and thyroid tissues. MafG gene expression is induced by oxidative stresses, such as hydrogen peroxide and electrophilic compounds. Mouse Mafg gene is induced by Nrf2-sMaf heterodimers through an antioxidant response element (ARE) at the promoter proximal region. In response to bile acids, mouse Mafg gene is induced by the nuclear receptor, FXR (Farnesoid X receptor).

== Function ==
Because of sequence similarity, no functional differences have been observed among the sMafs in terms of their bZIP structures. sMafs form homodimers by themselves and heterodimers with other specific bZIP transcription factors, such as CNC (cap 'n' collar) proteins [p45 NF-E2 (NFE2), Nrf1 (NFE2L1), Nrf2 (NFE2L2), and Nrf3 (NFE2L3)] and Bach proteins (BACH1 and BACH2).

sMaf homodimers bind to a palindromic DNA sequence called the Maf recognition element (MARE: TGCTGACTCAGCA) and its related sequences. Structural analyses have demonstrated that the basic region of a Maf factor recognizes the flanking GC sequences. By contrast, CNC-sMaf or Bach-sMaf heterodimers preferentially bind to DNA sequences (RTGA(C/G)NNNGC: R=A or G) that are slightly different from MARE. The latter DNA sequences have been recognized as antioxidant/electrophile response elements or NF-E2-binding motifs to which Nrf2-sMaf heterodimers and p45 NF-E2-sMaf heterodimer bind, respectively. It has been proposed that the latter sequences should be classified as CNC-sMaf-binding elements (CsMBEs).

It has also been reported that sMafs form heterodimers with other bZIP transcription factors, such as c-Jun and c-Fos.

== Target genes ==
sMafs regulate different target genes depending on their partners. For instance, the p45-NF-E2-sMaf heterodimer regulate genes responsible for platelet production. Nrf2-sMaf heterodimer regulates a battery of cytoprotective genes, such as antioxidant/xenobiotic metabolizing enzyme genes. The Bach1-sMaf heterodimer regulates the heme oxygenase-1 gene. In particular, it has been reported that Bach1-MafG heterodimers participate in the hypermethylation of genes with CpG island promoters in certain types of cancers. The contribution of individual sMafs to the transcriptional regulation of their target genes has not yet been well examined.

== Disease linkage ==
Loss of sMafs results in disease-like phenotypes as summarized in table below. Mice lacking MafG exhibit mild neuronal phenotype and mild thrombocytopenia. However, mice lacking Mafg and one allele of Mafk (Mafg^{−/−}::Mafk^{+/−}) exhibit more severe neuronal phenotypes, severe thrombocytopenia and cataracts. Mice lacking MafG and MafK (Mafg^{−/−}::Mafk^{−/−} ) die in the perinatal stage. Finally, mice lacking MafF, MafG and MafK are embryonic lethal. Embryonic fibroblasts that are derived from Maff^{−/−}::Mafg^{−/−}::Mafk^{−/−} mice fail to activate Nrf2-dependent cytoprotective genes in response to stress.

| Genotype | | | Mouse Phenotype |
| Maff | Mafg | Mafk | Mouse Phenotype |
|---|---|---|---|
| | −/− | | Mild motor ataxia, mild thrombocytopenia |
| | −/− | +/− | Severe motor ataxia, progressive neuronal degeneration, severe thrombocytopenia, and cataract |
| | −/− | −/− | More severe neuronal phenotypes, and perinatal lethal |
| −/− | +/− | −/− | No severe abnormality (Fertile) |
| −/− | −/− | −/− | Growth retardation, fetal liver hypoplasia, and lethal around embryonic day, 13.5 |
+/− (heterozygote), −/− (homozygote), blank (wild-type)

In addition, accumulating evidence suggests that as partners of CNC and Bach proteins, sMafs are involved in the onset and progression of various human diseases, including neurodegeneration, arteriosclerosis and cancer.
