= Small Maf =

Class of proteins

Small Maf (musculoaponeurotic fibrosarcoma) proteins are basic region leucine zipper-type transcription factors that can bind to DNA and regulate gene regulation. There are three small Maf (sMaf) proteins, namely MafF, MafG, and MafK, in vertebrates. HUGO Gene Nomenclature Committee (HGNC)-approved gene names of MAFF, MAFG and MAFK are "v-maf avian musculoaponeurotic fibrosarcoma oncogene homolog F, G, and K", respectively.

Through the leucine zipper structures, sMafs form homodimers by themselves and heterodimers with other specific bZIP transcription factors, such as transcription factors of the CNC (cap 'n' collar) and Bach families. Because CNC and Bach proteins cannot bind to DNA by themselves, sMafs are indispensable partners of the CNC and Bach families of transcription factors. Through interactions with these transcription factors, sMafs actively participate in transcriptional activation or repression depending on the nature of the heterodimeric partners.

== Subtypes ==
The following genes encode small Maf proteins

- MAFF (Human), Maff (Mouse), maft renamed maff (Zebrafish)
- MAFG (Human), Mafg (Mouse), mafg (Zebrafish)
- MAFK (Human), Mafk (Mouse), mafk (Zebrafish)

== History and discovery ==
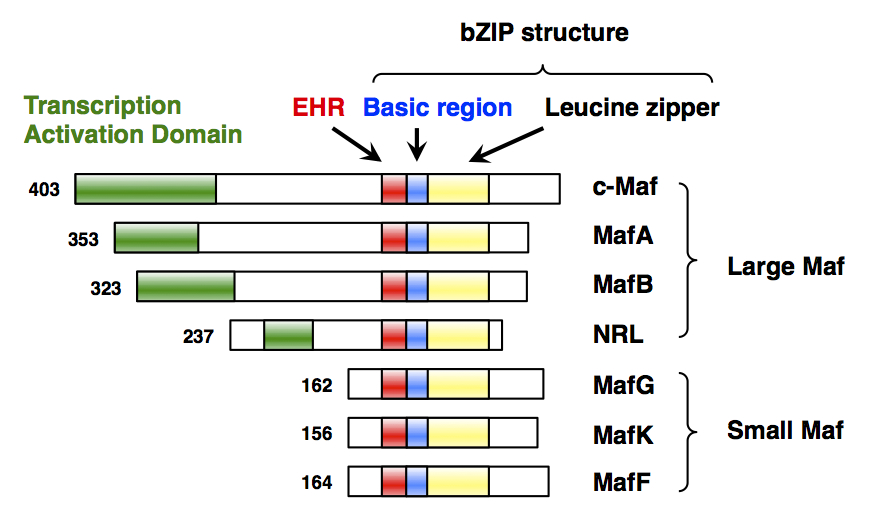
Fig.1. Structures of the Maf family proteins.

sMaf proteins were identified as members of the Maf family transcription factors. The Maf family is divided into two subfamilies, as follows: the large Maf subfamily (c-Maf, MafA, MafB, and NRL); and the small Maf subfamily (MafF, MafG and MafK) (Fig. 1). The first member of the Maf family is c-Maf, which was cloned as a cellular counterpart of the v-Maf oncogene isolated from avian musculoaponeurotic fibrosarcoma. The MafF, MafG, and MafK genes were later isolated. Because MafF, MafG and MafK are well-conserved 18 kDa proteins that lack a transcriptional activation domain, they are classified into the small Maf subfamily, which is structurally and functionally distinct from the large Maf subfamily.

== Gene structure and regulation ==
Three sMaf genes are widely expressed in various cell types and tissues under differential transcriptional regulation. In mouse, each sMaf gene harbors multiple first exons, which partly contribute to their tissue-specific or stimulus-specific expression patterns. Human MAFF is induced by proinflammatory cytokines. Mouse Mafg gene is induced by oxidative stresses (e.g. reactive oxygen species and electrophilic compounds) or the presence of bile acids. Mouse Mafk gene is under the regulation of GATA factors (GATA-1 and GATA-2 in hematopoietic tissues; and GATA-4 and GATA-6 in cardiac tissues).

== Protein structure ==
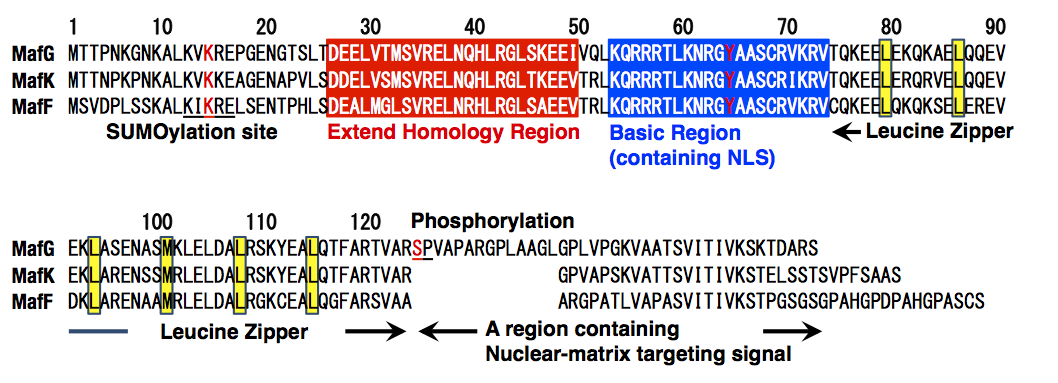
Fig. 2. Amino acid sequence alignments of human sMafs.

All members of the Maf family including sMafs have a bZIP structure that consists of the basic region for DNA binding and the leucine zipper structure for dimer formation (Fig. 2). The basic region of each Maf family protein contains a tyrosine residue, which is critical for the unique DNA-binding modes of these proteins (see below for details). In addition, each Maf family protein possesses an extended homology region (EHR), which contributes to stable DNA binding. The C-terminal region of sMaf includes a region required for its proper subnuclear localization. Two modifications have been reported for MafG: SUMOylation through a SUMOylation motif at the N-terminal region; phosphorylation through an ERK phosphorylation site in the C-terminal region.

== Function ==
sMaf proteins form homodimers by themselves and heterodimers with two other bZIP families of transcription factors, namely CNC (cap 'n' collar) proteins (p45 NF-E2 (NFE2), Nrf1 (NFE2L1), Nrf2 (NFE2L2), and Nrf3 (NFE2L3) – not to be confused with Nuclear Respiratory factors) and Bach proteins (Bach1 and Bach2). Because these proteins cannot bind DNA by themselves, sMaf proteins are indispensable partner molecules of the CNC and Bach transcription factors.

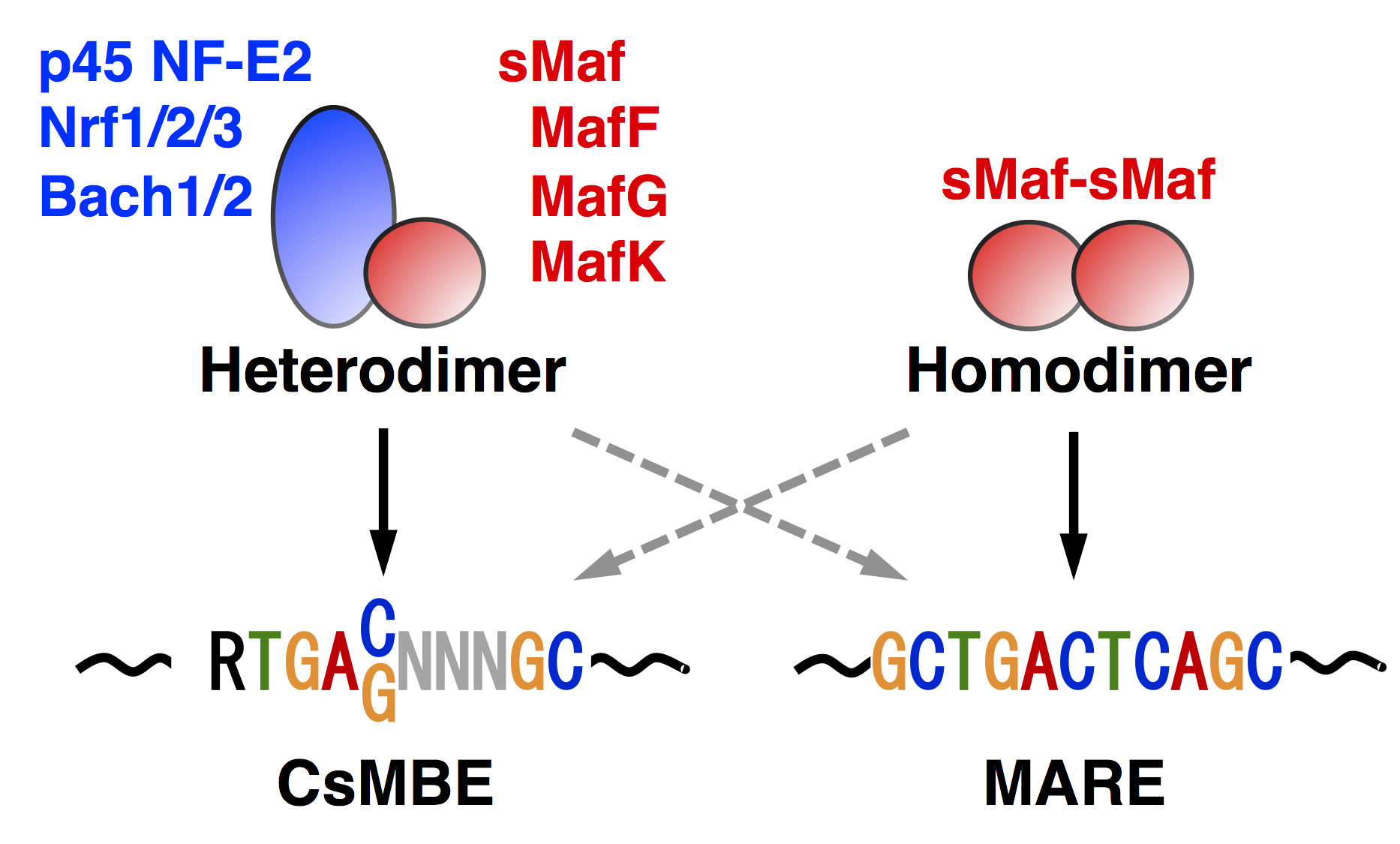
Fig.3 Binding motifs recognized by CNC/Bach and sMafs.

sMaf homodimers bind to a palindromic DNA sequence called the Maf recognition element (MARE: TGCTGACTCAGCA) and its related sequences. Structural analyses have demonstrated that the basic region of a Maf factor recognizes the flanking GC sequences. By contrast, CNC-sMaf or Bach-sMaf heterodimers preferentially bind to DNA sequences (RTGA(C/G)NNNGC: R=A or G) that are slightly different from MARE (Fig. 3). The latter DNA sequences have been recognized as antioxidant/electrophile response elements or NF-E2-binding motifs, to which Nrf2-sMaf heterodimers and p45 NF-E2-sMaf heterodimers bind, respectively. It has been proposed that the latter sequences are classified as CNC-sMaf-binding elements (CsMBEs).

It has also been reported that sMafs form heterodimers with other bZIP transcription factors, such as c-Jun and c-Fos. However, the biological significance of these heterodimers remains unknown.

=== sMaf homodimer ===
Because sMafs lack any canonical transcriptional activation domains, the sMaf homodimer act as a negative regulator. Overexpression of MafG is known to inhibit proplatelet formation, which is thought to reflect a process of platelet production. SUMOylation is required for MafG homodimer-mediated transcriptional repression.

=== p45 NF-E2-sMaf heterodimer ===
The p45 NF-E2-sMaf heterodimers are critical for platelet production. Knockout mouse studies have shown that MafG knockout mice show mild thrombocytopenia, whereas MafG and MafK double mutant mice show severe thrombocytopenia. Similar results were also observed in p45 NF-E2 knockout mice. The p45 NF-E2-sMaf heterodimer regulates genes responsible for platelet production and function.

=== Nrf1-sMaf heterodimer ===
The Nrf1-sMaf heterodimers are critical for neuronal homeostasis. Knockout mouse studies have shown that Mafg knockout mice display mild ataxia. Mafg and Mafk mutant mice (Mafg^{−/−}::Mafk^{+/−}) show more severe ataxia with progressive neuronal degeneration. Similar results have also been observed in Nrf1 central nervous-specific knockout mice. The Nrf1-sMaf heterodimers regulate genes responsible for proteasomal genes and metabolism genes.

=== Nrf2-sMaf heterodimer ===
The Nrf2-sMaf heterodimers are critical for oxidative and electrophilic stress response. Nrf2 is known as a master regulator of antioxidant and xenobiotic metabolizing enzyme genes. Induction of these cytoprotective genes is impaired in Nrf2 knockout mice. While MafG, MafK and MafF triple knockout mice die in embryonic stage, cultured cells derived from the triple knockout embryo fail to induce Nrf2-dependent cytoprotective genes in response to stimuli.

=== Bach1-sMaf heterodimer ===
The Bach1-sMaf heterodimer is critical for heme metabolism. Knockout mouse studies showed that heme oxygenase-1 gene expression is upregulated in Bach1 knockout mice. Similar results were also observed in MafG and MafK double mutant mice (Mafg^{−/−}::Mafk^{+/−}). These data show that the Bach1-sMaf heterodimer negatively regulates heme oxygenase-1 gene.

=== Bach2-sMaf heterodimer ===
The Bach2-sMaf heterodimers are critical for B cell differentiation. Bach2 knockout mice studies have demonstrated that Bach2 is required for class switching and somatic hypermutation of immunoglobulin genes. However, these phenotypes have not been examined in sMaf knockout mice.

=== sMaf function with compound or unknown partners ===
MafG and MafK double mutant mice (Mafg^{−/−}::Mafk^{+/−}) have cataracts. However, the interaction of CNC partner(s) with sMafs in this context remains undetermined. MafG, MafK and MafF triple knockout mice die during embryogenesis, demonstrating that sMafs are indispensable for embryonic development. Because Nrf1 and Nrf2 double mutant mice also die during embryogenesis, the loss of function of both Nrf1-sMaf and Nrf2-sMaf may contribute to the lethality.

Table. Phenotypes of small Maf single and compound mutant mice
Genotype			Phenotype
Maff	Mafg	Mafk	Phenotype
−/−			No apparent phenotype under laboratory conditions
	−/−		Mild motor ataxia, mild thrombocytopenia
		−/−	No apparent phenotype under laboratory conditions
	−/−	+/−	Severe motor ataxia, progressive neuronal degeneration, severe thrombocytopenia, and cataract
	−/−	−/−	More severe neuronal phenotypes, and perinatal lethal
−/−	+/−	−/−	No severe abnormality (Fertile)
−/−	−/−	−/−	Growth retardation, fetal liver hypoplasia, and lethal around embryonic day, 13.5
+/− (heterozygote), −/− (homozygote), blank (wild-type)

== Disease association ==
sMafs have been suggested to be involved in various diseases as heterodimeric partners of CNC and Bach proteins. Because Nrf2-sMaf heterodimers regulate a battery of antioxidant and xenobiotic metabolizing enzymes, impaired function of sMafs is expected to make cells vulnerable to various stresses and increase the risk of various diseases, such as cancers. SNPs associated with the cancer onset were reported in MAFF and MAFG genes. In addition, Nrf2 is known to be critical for anti-inflammatory responses. Thus, sMaf insufficiencies are expected to result in prolonged inflammation that can cause diseases, such as neurodegeneration and atherosclerosis.

Conversely, sMafs also appear to contribute to cancer malignancy. Certain cancers contain somatic mutations in NRF2(NFE2L2) or KEAP1 that cause constitutive activation of Nrf2 and promote cell proliferation. It has also been reported that the Bach1-MafG heterodimer contributes to cancer malignancy by repressing tumor suppressor genes. Thus, as partners of Nrf2 and Bach1, sMafs are expected to play critical roles in cancer cells.
