= NFE2L2 =

Human protein and coding gene

Identifiers
- Aliases: NFE2L2, NRF2, HEBP1, nuclear factor, erythroid 2 like 2, IMDDHH, Nrf-2, NFE2 like bZIP transcription factor 2
- External IDs: OMIM: 600492; MGI: 108420; GeneCards: NFE2L2
Available structures
PDB	Ortholog search: PDBe RCSB
PDB	List of PDB id codes 2FLU, 2LZ1, 3ZGC, 4IFL

Gene location (Human)
Chr.	Chromosome 2 (human)
Band	2q31.2	Start	177,227,595 bp
Band	2q31.2	End	177,392,697 bp

Gene location (Mouse)
Chr.	Chromosome 2 (mouse)
Band	2 C3|2 44.75 cM	Start	75,505,857 bp
Band	2 C3|2 44.75 cM	End	75,534,985 bp
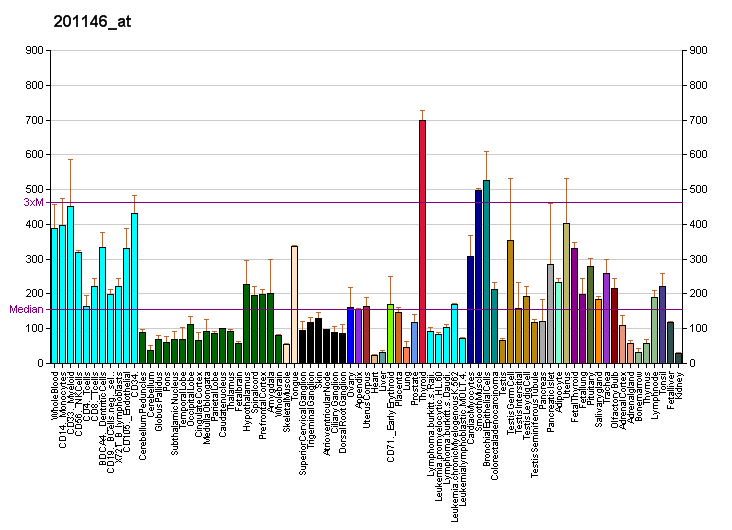
RNA expression pattern
Bgee	Human / Mouse (ortholog); Top expressed in: epithelium of nasopharynx; mucosa of pharynx; oral cavity; bronchial epithelial cell; pylorus; cardia; pericardium; human penis; jejunal mucosa; germinal epithelium / Top expressed in: transitional epithelium of urinary bladder; epithelium of stomach; mucous cell of stomach; pyloric antrum; left lung lobe; esophagus; duodenum; stroma of bone marrow; granulocyte; respiratory epithelium; More reference expression data
BioGPS	More reference expression data
Gene ontology
Molecular function	RNA polymerase II cis-regulatory region sequence-specific DNA binding; DNA binding; sequence-specific DNA binding; protein domain specific binding; DNA-binding transcription factor activity; transcription cis-regulatory region binding; DNA-binding transcription activator activity, RNA polymerase II-specific; protein binding; transcription coregulator binding; transcription factor binding; DNA-binding transcription factor activity, RNA polymerase II-specific
Cellular component	cytoplasm; cytosol; centrosome; plasma membrane; protein-DNA complex; chromatin; nucleus; nucleoplasm; Golgi apparatus
Biological process	positive regulation of glucose import; negative regulation of endothelial cell apoptotic process; negative regulation of hematopoietic stem cell differentiation; regulation of embryonic development; cellular response to glucose starvation; regulation of transcription, DNA-templated; cellular response to laminar fluid shear stress; positive regulation of transcription from RNA polymerase II promoter in response to stress; cellular response to tumor necrosis factor; proteasomal ubiquitin-independent protein catabolic process; negative regulation of cell death; cellular response to fluid shear stress; cell redox homeostasis; PERK-mediated unfolded protein response; positive regulation of glutathione biosynthetic process; transcription, DNA-templated; response to endoplasmic reticulum stress; positive regulation of ER-associated ubiquitin-dependent protein catabolic process; positive regulation of transcription, DNA-templated; endoplasmic reticulum unfolded protein response; positive regulation of gene expression; positive regulation of reactive oxygen species metabolic process; positive regulation of blood coagulation; positive regulation of transcription from RNA polymerase II promoter in response to oxidative stress; protein ubiquitination; cellular response to oxidative stress; negative regulation of oxidative stress-induced intrinsic apoptotic signaling pathway; negative regulation of hydrogen peroxide-induced cell death; inflammatory response; regulation of removal of superoxide radicals; positive regulation of transcription by RNA polymerase II; cellular response to hydrogen peroxide; proteasome-mediated ubiquitin-dependent protein catabolic process; positive regulation of blood vessel endothelial cell migration; ageing; cellular response to hypoxia; negative regulation of vascular associated smooth muscle cell migration; negative regulation of cardiac muscle cell apoptotic process; transcription by RNA polymerase II; positive regulation of angiogenesis; positive regulation of neuron projection development; aflatoxin catabolic process; cellular response to angiotensin; positive regulation of transcription from RNA polymerase II promoter in response to hypoxia; viral process
Sources:Amigo / QuickGO
Orthologs
Databases	NCBI: entry; OMA: entry
Species	Human	Mouse
Entrez	4780	18024
Ensembl	ENSG00000116044	ENSMUSG00000015839
UniProt	Q16236	Q60795
RefSeq (mRNA)	NM_006164; NM_001145412; NM_001145413; NM_001313900; NM_001313901 NM_001313902; NM_001313903; NM_001313904	NM_010902; NM_001399226
RefSeq (protein)	NP_001138884; NP_001138885; NP_001300829; NP_001300830; NP_001300831 NP_001300832; NP_001300833; NP_006155	NP_035032; NP_001386155
Location (UCSC)	Chr 2: 177.23 – 177.39 Mb	Chr 2: 75.51 – 75.53 Mb
PubMed search
- Wikidata
View/Edit Human	View/Edit Mouse

Nuclear factor erythroid 2-related factor 2, also known as NFE2-Related Factor 2 (NRF2) or nuclear factor erythroid-derived 2-like 2 (NFE2L2), is a transcription factor that in humans is encoded by the NFE2L2 gene. NRF2 is a basic leucine zipper (bZIP) protein that may regulate the expression of antioxidant proteins that protect against oxidative damage triggered by injury and inflammation, according to preliminary research. In vitro, NRF2 binds to antioxidant response elements (AREs) in the promoter regions of genes encoding cytoprotective proteins. NRF2 induces the expression of heme oxygenase 1 in vitro leading to an increase in phase II enzymes. NRF2 also inhibits the NLRP3 inflammasome.

NRF2 appears to participate in a complex regulatory network and performs a pleiotropic role in the regulation of metabolism, inflammation, autophagy, proteostasis, mitochondrial physiology, and immune responses. Several drugs that stimulate the NFE2L2 pathway are being studied for treatment of diseases that are caused by oxidative stress.

== Structure ==
NFE2L2 and other genes, such as NFE2, NFE2L1 and NFE2L3, encode basic leucine zipper (bZIP) transcription factors. They share highly conserved regions that are distinct from other bZIP families, such as JUN and FOS, although remaining regions have diverged considerably from each other.

NRF2 is a basic leucine zipper (bZip) transcription factor with a Cap "n" Collar (CNC) structure. NRF2 possesses seven highly conserved domains called NRF2-ECH homology (Neh) domains. From the N-terminus to the C-terminus, they are:

- Neh2 allows for binding of NRF2 to its cytosolic repressor Keap1, through the conserved sites ETGE and DLG.
- Neh4 and Neh5 act as transactivation domains by binding to cAMP Response Element Binding Protein (CREB), which possesses intrinsic histone acetyltransferase activity.
- Neh7 is involved in the repression of Nrf2 transcriptional activity by the retinoid X receptor α through a physical association between the two proteins.
- Neh6 may contain a degron that is involved in a redox-insensitive process of degradation of NRF2. This occurs even in stressed cells, which normally extend the half-life of NRF2 protein relative to unstressed conditions by suppressing other degradation pathways. Its two conserved motifs, DSGIS and DSAPGS, are recognized by β-TrCP (BTRC and FBXW11 in mammals).
- Neh1 is a CNC-bZIP domain that allows Nrf2 to heterodimerize with small Maf proteins (MAFF, MAFG, MAFK).
- Neh3 may play a role in NRF2 protein stability and may act as a transactivation domain, interacting with component of the transcriptional apparatus.

The "domains" of Nrf2 are regions of conservation, not protein domains in the structural sense. Neh2, Neh7 and Neh1 are partially unstructured. Neh3 and Nah6 is predicted to be mainly unstructured. Neh4 and Neh5 are disordered, meaning they do not fold into a fixed shape. Neh4 and Neh5 have been predicted as structured, but experimental data show otherwise. The methods employed by InterPro, from curated domain patterns to AlphaFold, cover less than half of human Nrf2.

== Tissue distribution ==
NRF2 is ubiquitously expressed with the highest concentrations (in descending order) in the kidney, muscle, lung, heart, liver, and brain.

== Localization and function ==
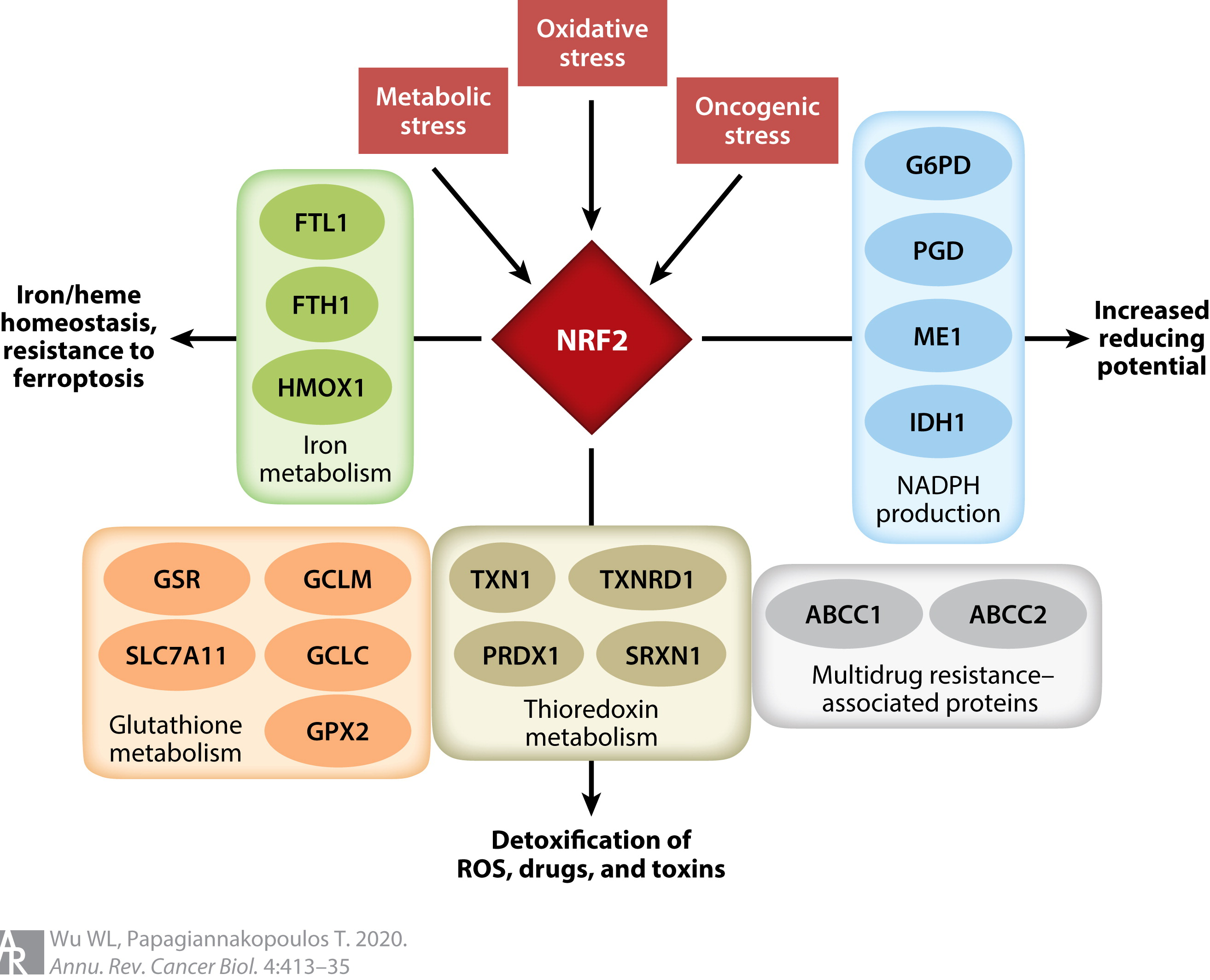
Activating inputs and functional outputs of the NRF2 pathway

Under normal or unstressed conditions, NRF2 is kept in the cytoplasm by a cluster of proteins that degrade it quickly. Under oxidative stress, NRF2 is not degraded, but instead travels to the nucleus where it binds to a DNA promoter and initiates transcription of antioxidative genes and their proteins.

NRF2 is kept in the cytoplasm by Kelch like-ECH-associated protein 1 (KEAP1) and Cullin 3, which degrade NRF2 by ubiquitination. Cullin 3 ubiquitinates NRF2, while Keap1 is a substrate adaptor protein that facilitates the reaction. Once NRF2 is ubiquitinated, it is transported to the proteasome, where it is degraded and its components recycled. Under normal conditions, NRF2 has a half-life of only 20 minutes. Oxidative stress or electrophilic stress disrupts critical cysteine residues in Keap1, disrupting the Keap1-Cul3 ubiquitination system. When NRF2 is not ubiquitinated, it builds up in the cytoplasm, and translocates into the nucleus. In the nucleus, it combines (forms a heterodimer) with one of small Maf proteins (MAFF, MAFG, MAFK) and binds to the antioxidant response element (ARE) in the upstream promoter region of many antioxidative genes, and initiates their transcription.

== Target genes ==
Activation of NRF2 induces the transcription of genes encoding cytoprotective proteins. These include:

- NAD(P)H quinone oxidoreductase 1 (Nqo1) is a prototypical NRF2 target protein which catalyzes the reduction and detoxification of highly reactive quinones that can cause redox cycling and oxidative stress.
- Glutamate-cysteine ligase catalytic subunit (GCLC) and glutamate-cysteine ligase regulatory subunit (GCLM) form a heterodimer, which is the rate-limiting step in the synthesis of glutathione (GSH), a very powerful endogenous antioxidant. Both Gclc and Gclm are characteristic NRF2 target genes, which establish NRF2 as a regulator of glutathione, one of the most important antioxidants in the body.
- Sulfiredoxin 1 (SRXN1) and Thioredoxin reductase 1 (TXNRD1) support the reduction and recovery of peroxiredoxins, proteins important in the detoxification of highly reactive peroxides, including hydrogen peroxide and peroxynitrite.
- Heme oxygenase-1 (HMOX1, HO-1) is an enzyme that catalyzes the breakdown of heme into the antioxidant biliverdin, the anti-inflammatory agent carbon monoxide, and iron. HO-1 is a NRF2 target gene that has been shown to protect from a variety of pathologies, including sepsis, hypertension, atherosclerosis, acute lung injury, kidney injury, and pain. Conversely, induction of HO-1 has been shown to exacerbate early brain injury after intracerebral hemorrhage.
- The glutathione S-transferase (GST) family includes cytosolic, mitochondrial, and microsomal enzymes that catalyze the conjugation of GSH with endogenous and xenobiotic electrophiles. After detoxification by glutathione (GSH) conjugation catalyzed by GSTs, the body can eliminate potentially harmful and toxic compounds. GSTs are induced by NRF2 activation and represent an important route of detoxification.
- The UDP-glucuronosyltransferase (UGT) family catalyze the conjugation of a glucuronic acid moiety to a variety of endogenous and exogenous substances, making them more water-soluble and readily excreted. Important substrates for glucuronidation include bilirubin and acetaminophen. NRF2 has been shown to induce UGT1A1 and UGT1A6.
- Multidrug resistance-associated proteins (Mrps) are important membrane transporters that efflux various compounds from various organs and into bile or plasma, with subsequent excretion in the feces or urine, respectively. Mrps have been shown to be upregulated by NRF2 and alteration in their expression can dramatically alter the pharmacokinetics and toxicity of compounds.
- Kelch-like ECH-associated protein 1 is also a primary target of NFE2L2. Several interesting studies have also identified this hidden circuit in NRF2 regulations. An AREs located on a negative strand of the murine Keap1 (INrf2) gene can subtly connect Nrf2 activation to Keap1 transcription. Regarding NRF2 occupancies in human lymphocytes, an approximately 700 bp locus within the KEAP1 promoter region was consistently top rank enriched, even at the whole-genome scale. These basic findings have depicted a mutually influenced pattern between NRF2 and KEAP1. NRF2-driven KEAP1 expression characterized in human cancer contexts, especially in human squamous cell cancers, implicated a new perspective in understanding NRF2 signaling regulation.

== Clinical relevance ==
=== Disease association ===
Genetic activation of NRF2 has been implicated in the development of de novo tumors, as well as in the progression of atherosclerosis by increasing plasma cholesterol levels and hepatic cholesterol content. It has been suggested that these pro-atherogenic effects may outweigh the protective benefits of NRF2-mediated antioxidant induction.

=== Therapeutic ===
Activation of the NRF2 (nuclear factor erythroid 2–related factor 2) pathway has been explored as a therapeutic strategy due to its role in regulating antioxidant and cytoprotective responses. One of the most clinically advanced NRF2 activators is dimethyl fumarate, marketed as Tecfidera by Biogen Idec. It was approved by the Food and Drug Administration in March 2013 following a successful Phase III clinical trial that demonstrated reduced relapse rates and delayed progression of disability in individuals with multiple sclerosis.

Although the precise mechanism of action of dimethyl fumarate is not fully understood, it is known to activate the NRF2 signaling pathway. Both dimethyl fumarate and its active metabolite, monomethyl fumarate, promote NRF2 nuclear translocation and the subsequent transcription of antioxidant response element (ARE)-driven genes. In addition, they have been shown to act as nicotinic acid receptor agonists in vitro.

Despite its clinical efficacy, dimethyl fumarate is associated with several adverse effects, including anaphylaxis, angioedema, progressive multifocal leukoencephalopathy (PML), lymphopenia, and liver damage. Common side effects include flushing and gastrointestinal symptoms such as diarrhea, nausea, and upper abdominal pain.

Other NRF2 activators have also been investigated. The dithiolethiones are a class of organosulfur compounds known to induce NRF2 activity. Among them, oltipraz is the most extensively studied. Oltipraz has been shown to suppress tumor formation in multiple rodent tissues, including the bladder, colon, liver, lung, and pancreas, by upregulating NRF2-dependent detoxification pathways. However, clinical trials of oltipraz have failed to demonstrate clear therapeutic benefit and have reported significant toxicities, including neurotoxicity and gastrointestinal disturbances. Additionally, oltipraz has been found to generate superoxide radicals, which may offset its NRF2-mediated protective effects.

MIND4-17 is a selective NRF2 activator which is used for research into this pathway.

== Interactions ==
NFE2L2 has been shown to interact with MAFF, MAFG, MAFK, C-jun, CREBBP, EIF2AK3, KEAP1, and UBC.

== See also ==
- Heme oxygenase
- Carbon monoxide-releasing molecules
