= Iglv6-57 =

Human protein

IGLV6-57

Identifiers
- Aliases: IGLV6-57, V1-22, immunoglobulin lambda variable 6-57
- External IDs: GeneCards: IGLV6-57; OMA:IGLV6-57 - orthologs

Gene location (Human)
Chr.	Chromosome 22 (human)
Band	22q11.22	Start	22,195,799 bp
Band	22q11.22	End	22,196,276 bp
RNA expression pattern
Bgee	Human / Mouse (ortholog); Top expressed in: duodenum; rectum; lymph node; mucosa of transverse colon; spleen; appendix; gallbladder; bone marrow; bone marrow cell; testicle / n/a; More reference expression data
BioGPS	n/a
Orthologs
Species	Human	Mouse
Entrez	28778	n/a
Ensembl	ENSG00000211640	n/a
UniProt	n a	n/a
RefSeq (mRNA)	n/a	n/a
RefSeq (protein)	n/a	n/a
Location (UCSC)	Chr 22: 22.2 – 22.2 Mb	n/a
PubMed search		n/a
- Wikidata
View/Edit Human

Immunoglobulin lambda variable 6-57 is a protein which is encoded by the IGLV6-57 gene in humans.

This gene is primarily expressed in the lymphatic system. IGLV6-57 is an extracellular protein that has been predicted to reside within the cytoplasm of cells. The function of IGLV6-57 is predicted to be involved in the immune response and enabling antigen binding activity. This prediction also matches with pathogen recognition from antibodies utilizing IGLV6-57 light chains.

== Gene ==
=== Aliases ===
Known aliases of IGLV6-57 include V1-22 or IGLV657.

=== Locus ===
Human IGLV6-57 gene is found on the forward (+) strand at the locus NC_000022.11. The gene ranges from position 22026076 to position 22922913 on chromosome 22.

=== mRNA ===
IGLV6-57's transcript is reported to be around 478 nucleotides long. It has two exons separated between one intron.

=== Expression pattern ===
IGLV6-57 is moderately expressed in spleen, lymph node, and tonsil tissue.

=== Transcript ===
IGLV6-57 gene contains no alternatively spliced forms because it is an immunoglobulin variable-region gene segment, not a complete antibody gene.

== Protein ==
=== Protein characteristics ===
The predicted molecular weight of IGLV6-57 is 12.566 kDa, and it has a predicted isoelectric point (pI) of pH 4.59. In terms of amino acid composition, IGLV6-57 has a relatively proportion of polar amino acids serine, glycine, and threonine. It also is relatively poor in histidine, methionine, and tryptophan.

=== Isoforms ===
Immunoglobulin Lambda Variable 6-57 primarily expresses a single protein isoform.

=== Secondary structure ===
The predicted secondary structure of IGLV6-57 is composed primarily of β strands.

=== Teritiary structure ===
The predicted teritiary structure of IGLV6-57 consists of two antiparallel β sheets stabilized by conserved intradomain disulfide bond.

=== Post-translational modifications ===
==== Disulfide bond formation ====
Conceptual translation of human IGLV6-57 mRNA revealed two conserved cysteine residues at position 20 and 89 and are predicted to form an intradomain disulfide bond.

=== Cellular localization ===
Computational prediction have identifies the IGLV6-57 protein in the extracellular and cytoplasm location. IGLV6-57 is predicted to be a soluble protein.

== Regulation and expression ==
=== Promoters ===
No promoter was identified in the analyzed upstream sequence of IGLV6-57 using computational promoter prediction methods.

=== Transcription factors ===
The following table summarizes transcription factors predicted to bind highly conserved regions of the IGLV6-57 sequence.

Selected transcription factors predicted to bind to highly conserved regions of IGLV6-57
Transcription Factor	Description
MAFG	bZip Maf transcription factor protein
MAFK	bZip Maf transcription factor protein
MAFA	β cell-specific activator

=== Expression ===
==== Tissue specificity ====
According to RNA-seq data, IGLV6-57 is expressed most highly in lymph node, spleen, and appendix tissue.

==== Embryonic development ====
IGLV6-57 expression is highest in the fetal adrenal gland during mid-gestation (16–18 weeks), with lower expression in several other fetal tissues. No specific role in embryonic development has been established.

==== Differential expression ====
IGLV6-57 has been observed to be expressed at higher levels in beta-catenin-depleted cells than in untreated control cells.

IGLV6-57 has been observed to be expressed at higher levels in tumor tissue than in adjacent normal tissue.

== Interacting proteins ==
The StringNetwork database indicates that the following proteins have been found to interact with the IGLV6-57 protein.

Protein	Description
FCAR	binds the heavy-chain constant region of Immunoglobulin A (IgA) antibodies
CD5	cluster of differentiation expressed on the surface of T cells
TFPI	single-chain polypeptide which can reversibly inhibit factor Xa (Xa)

== Homology and evolution ==
=== Orthologs ===
IGLV6-57 has orthologs in Mammalia, Aves, Reptillia, and Amphibia. A table of selected orthologs is listed below.

==== Selected orthologs of the homo sapiens IGLV6-57 protein ====
Genus and Species	Common Name	Taxonomic Group	Date of Divergence from Humans (MYA)	Accession Number #	Sequence Length	Sequence Identity
Homo sapiens	Human	Primates	0	NP_037510.1	116 aa	43%
Mus musculus	House mouse	Placental	87	NP_001415808.1	130 aa	68%
Saccopteryx bilineata	Greater sac-winged bat	Chiroptera	94	XP_066116077.1	121 aa	86%
Phascolarctos cinereus	Koala	Marsupials Mammal	160	XP_020833304.1	123 aa	69%
Ornithorhynchus anatinus	Platypus	Monotremes	180	XP_028904584.1	123 aa	63%
Athene noctua	Little owl	Aves	319	XP_074777375.1	272 aa	58%
Centrocercus urophasianus	Greater sage-grouse	Aves	319	XP_042685107.1	125 aa	56%
Pseudonaja textilis	Eastern brown snake	Squamata	319	XP_026574391.1	110 aa	61%
Crocodylus porosus	Saltwater crocodile	Crocodilia	319	XP_019394969.1	125 aa	59%
Pelodiscus sinensis	Chinese softshell turtle	Testudines	319	XP_075753974.1	137 aa	59%
Bufo bufo	Common toad	Anura	352	XP_040275605.1	239 aa	53%
Ambystoma mexicanum	Axolotl	Caudata	352	XP_069476393.1	144 aa	48%
Hyla sarda	Sardinian tree frog	Anura	352	XP_056387603.1	130 aa	46%
Rhinatrema bivittatum	Two-lined caecilian	Gymnophiona	352	XP_029426890.1	127 aa	51%

==== Evolutionary history ====
IGLV6-57 is not a highly conserved gene due to evolutionary divergence driven by the adaptive immune system. The most evolutionary distant ortholog of IGLV6-57 is in the Sardinian tree frog (Hyla sarda); and it is conserved from Amphibia to Mammalia, with no detectable orthologs in invertebrates.

=== Paralogs ===
IGLV6-57 contains numerous paralogous genes located within the immunoglobulin lambda locus on chromosome 22.

Paralog genes located within the immunoglobulin lambda locus on chromosome 22
Paralog	Description
IGLVV-58	antigen recognition
IGLV11-55	non-functional immunoglobulin lambda variable gene
IGLV1-56	antigen recognition
BMP6P1	pseudogene

== Clinical significance ==
IGLV6-57 has been a linked site for an amyloid-associated residue change associated with AL amyloidosis. Additionally, proteins from this specific lambda light chain class is likely to unfold, exposing the hydrophobic core of the protein. Due to structural instability, the IGLV6-57 gene segment frequently misfolds.
