= BATF =

BATF may refer to:

- BATF (gene), a protein-coding gene in humans that encodes a transcription factor
- Bangalore Agenda Task Force, a public–private partnership in Bangalore, India
- Bureau of Alcohol, Tobacco, Firearms and Explosives (ATF) at the United States Department of Justice

== See also ==
- BATF2, a protein-coding gene in humans that encodes a transcription factor
