= N-myc-interactor =

Protein-coding gene in the species Homo sapiens

NMI

Identifiers
- Aliases: NMI, N-myc and STAT interactor
- External IDs: OMIM: 603525; MGI: 1928368; HomoloGene: 3441; GeneCards: NMI; OMA:NMI - orthologs

Gene location (Human)
Chr.	Chromosome 2 (human)
Band	2q23.3	Start	151,270,470 bp
Band	2q23.3	End	151,289,894 bp

Gene location (Mouse)
Chr.	Chromosome 2 (mouse)
Band	2|2 C1.1	Start	51,838,499 bp
Band	2|2 C1.1	End	51,863,506 bp
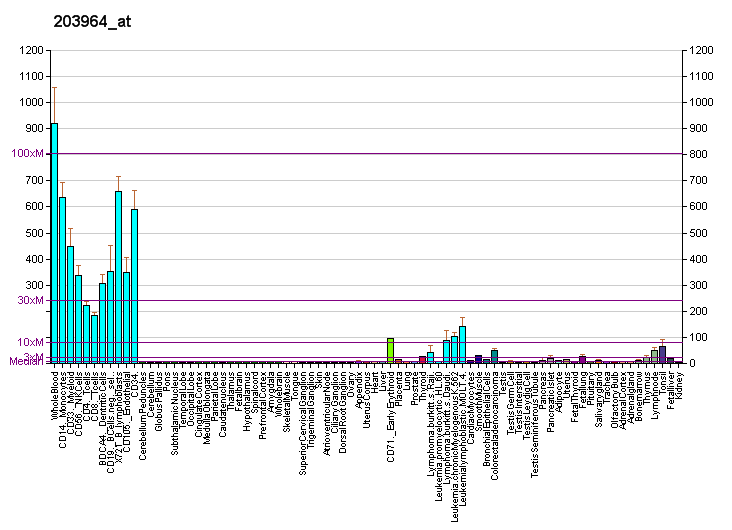
RNA expression pattern
Bgee	Human / Mouse (ortholog); Top expressed in: monocyte; granulocyte; trabecular bone; blood; bone marrow; palpebral conjunctiva; epithelium of nasopharynx; parietal pleura; tendon of biceps brachii; germinal epithelium / Top expressed in: jejunum; mucous cell of stomach; duodenum; ileum; granulocyte; right lung lobe; thymus; seminal vesicula; spleen; left colon; More reference expression data
BioGPS	More reference expression data
Gene ontology
Molecular function	protein binding; transcription coregulator activity; identical protein binding
Cellular component	cytoplasm; nucleoplasm; cytosol
Biological process	transcription by RNA polymerase II; interferon-gamma-mediated signaling pathway; regulation of nucleic acid-templated transcription; positive regulation of protein K48-linked ubiquitination; receptor signaling pathway via JAK-STAT; negative regulation of type I interferon production; inflammatory response; negative regulation of innate immune response
Sources:Amigo / QuickGO
Orthologs
Species	Human	Mouse
Entrez	9111	64685
Ensembl	ENSG00000123609	ENSMUSG00000026946
UniProt	Q13287	O35309
RefSeq (mRNA)	NM_004688	NM_001141948; NM_001141949; NM_019401
RefSeq (protein)	NP_004679	NP_001135420; NP_001135421; NP_062274
Location (UCSC)	Chr 2: 151.27 – 151.29 Mb	Chr 2: 51.84 – 51.86 Mb
PubMed search
- Wikidata
View/Edit Human	View/Edit Mouse

N-myc-interactor also known as N-myc and STAT interactor is a protein that in humans is encoded by the NMI gene.

== Function ==
NMYC interactor (NMI) interacts with NMYC and CMYC (two members of the oncogene Myc family), and other transcription factors containing a Zip, HLH, or HLH-Zip motif. The NMI protein also interacts with all STATs except STAT2 and augments STAT-mediated transcription in response to cytokines IL-2 and IFN-gamma. The NMI mRNA has low expression levels in all human fetal and adult tissues tested except brain and has high expression in cancer cell line-myeloid leukemias.

== Interactions ==
NMI (gene) has been shown to interact with BRCA1, IFI35, Myc, and STAT5A, and TUBA3C.
