= MAFK =

Protein-coding gene in the species Homo sapiens

Identifiers
- Aliases: MAFK, NFE2U, P18, MAF bZIP transcription factor K
- External IDs: OMIM: 600197; MGI: 99951; GeneCards: MAFK

Gene location (Human)
Chr.	Chromosome 7 (human)
Band	7p22.3	Start	1,530,702 bp
Band	7p22.3	End	1,543,043 bp

Gene location (Mouse)
Chr.	Chromosome 5 (mouse)
Band	5 G2|5 78.81 cM	Start	139,777,268 bp
Band	5 G2|5 78.81 cM	End	139,788,408 bp
RNA expression pattern
Bgee	Human / Mouse (ortholog); Top expressed in: apex of heart; ascending aorta; popliteal artery; tibial arteries; right coronary artery; gastric mucosa; right lung; saphenous vein; muscle layer of sigmoid colon; left coronary artery / Top expressed in: granulocyte; ascending aorta; muscle of thigh; aortic valve; fetal liver hematopoietic progenitor cell; right kidney; tibiofemoral joint; jejunum; yolk sac; digastric muscle; More reference expression data
BioGPS	n/a
Gene ontology
Molecular function	DNA-binding transcription factor activity; DNA binding; transcription coregulator binding; transcription cis-regulatory region binding; protein binding; DNA-binding transcription repressor activity, RNA polymerase II-specific; sequence-specific DNA binding; DNA-binding transcription factor activity, RNA polymerase II-specific; RING-like zinc finger domain binding; RNA polymerase II cis-regulatory region sequence-specific DNA binding; DNA-binding transcription activator activity, RNA polymerase II-specific
Cellular component	nucleoplasm; nucleus
Biological process	blood coagulation; regulation of transcription, DNA-templated; nervous system development; transcription, DNA-templated; negative regulation of transcription by RNA polymerase II; positive regulation of transcription by RNA polymerase II
Sources:Amigo / QuickGO
Orthologs
Databases	NCBI: entry; OMA: entry
Species	Human	Mouse
Entrez	7975	17135
Ensembl	ENSG00000198517	ENSMUSG00000018143
UniProt	O60675	Q61827
RefSeq (mRNA)	NM_002360	NM_010757
RefSeq (protein)	NP_002351	NP_034887
Location (UCSC)	Chr 7: 1.53 – 1.54 Mb	Chr 5: 139.78 – 139.79 Mb
PubMed search
- Wikidata
View/Edit Human	View/Edit Mouse

Transcription factor MafK is a bZip Maf transcription factor protein that in humans is encoded by the MAFK gene.

MafK is one of the small Maf proteins, which are basic region and leucine zipper (bZIP)-type transcription factors. The HUGO Gene Nomenclature Committee-approved gene name of MAFK is “v-maf avian musculoaponeurotic fibrosarcoma oncogene homolog K”.

== Discovery ==
MafK was first cloned and identified in chicken in 1993 as a member of the small Maf (sMaf) genes. MafK was also identified as p18 NF-E2, a component of NF-E2 complex binding to a specific motif (NF-E2) in the regulatory regions of β-globin and other erythroid-related genes. MAFK has been identified in many vertebrates, including humans. There are three functionally redundant sMaf proteins in vertebrates, MafF, MafG, and MafK.

== Structure ==
MafK has a bZIP structure that consists of a basic region for DNA binding and a leucine zipper structure for dimer formation. Similar to other sMafs, MafK lacks any canonical transcriptional activation domains.

== Expression ==
MAFK is broadly but differentially expressed in various tissues. MAFK expression was detected in all 16 tissues examined by the human BodyMap Project, but was relatively abundant in adipose, lung and skeletal muscle tissues. Mouse Mafk is regulated by different GATA factors in both hematopoietic and cardiac tissues. MAFK expression is influenced by TGF-β and Wnt signaling, and rat Mafk expression is influenced by NGF and AKT in neuronal cells.

== Function ==
Because of sequence similarity, no functional differences have been observed among the sMafs in terms of their bZIP structures. sMafs form homodimers by themselves and heterodimers with other specific bZIP transcription factors, such as CNC (cap 'n' collar) proteins [p45 NF-E2 (NFE2), Nrf1 (NFE2L1), Nrf2 (NFE2L2), and Nrf3 (NFE2L3)] and Bach proteins (BACH1 and BACH2).

sMaf homodimers bind to a palindromic DNA sequence called the Maf recognition element (MARE: TGCTGACTCAGCA) and its related sequences. Structural analyses have demonstrated that the basic region of a Maf factor recognizes the flanking GC sequences. By contrast, CNC-sMaf or Bach-sMaf heterodimers preferentially bind to DNA sequences (RTGA(C/G)NNNGC: R=A or G) that are slightly different from MARE. The latter DNA sequences have been recognized as antioxidant/electrophile response elements or NF-E2-binding motifs to which Nrf2-sMaf heterodimers and p45 NF-E2-sMaf heterodimer bind, respectively. It has been proposed that the latter sequences should be classified as CNC-sMaf-binding elements (CsMBEs).

It has also been reported that sMafs form heterodimers with other bZIP transcription factors, such as c-Jun and c-Fos.

== Target genes ==
sMafs regulate different target genes depending on their partners. For instance, the p45-NF-E2-sMaf heterodimer regulates genes responsible for platelet production. Although it has not been confirmed by mouse genetic studies, many studies suggest that p45-NFE2-sMaf heterodimer is involved in the regulation of β-globin and other erythroid-related genes. Nrf2-sMaf heterodimer regulates a battery of cytoprotective genes, such as antioxidant/xenobiotic metabolizing enzyme genes. The Bach1-sMaf heterodimer regulates the heme oxygenase-1 gene. The contribution of individual sMafs to the transcriptional regulation of their target genes has not yet been well examined.

== Disease linkage ==
Loss of sMafs results in disease-like phenotypes as summarized in table below. Mice lacking MafK are seemingly healthy under laboratory conditions, while mice lacking MafG exhibit mild neuronal phenotype and mild thrombocytopenia. However, mice lacking Mafg and one allele of Mafk (Mafg^{−/−}::Mafk^{+/−}) exhibit progressive neuronal degeneration, thrombocytopenia and cataract, and mice lacking MafG and MafK (Mafg^{−/−}::Mafk^{−/−}) exhibit more severe neuronal degeneration and die in the perinatal stage. Mice lacking MafF, MafG and MafK are embryonic lethal. Embryonic fibroblasts that are derived from Maff^{−/−}::Mafg^{−/−}::Mafk^{−/−} mice fail to activate Nrf2-dependent cytoprotective genes in response to stress.

Genotype			Mouse Phenotype
Maff	Mafg	Mafk	Mouse Phenotype
		−/−	No apparent phenotype under laboratory conditions
	−/−		Mild motor ataxia, mild thrombocytopenia
	−/−	+/−	Severe motor ataxia, progressive neuronal degeneration, severe thrombocytopenia, and cataract
	−/−	−/−	More severe neuronal phenotypes, and perinatal lethal
−/−	+/−	−/−	No severe abnormality (Fertile)
−/−	−/−	−/−	Growth retardation, fetal liver hypoplasia, and lethal around embryonic day, 13.5
+/− (heterozygote), −/− (homozygote), blank (wild-type)

In addition, accumulating evidence suggests that as partners of CNC and Bach proteins, sMafs are involved in the onset and progression of various human diseases, including neurodegeneration, arteriosclerosis and cancer.
