= NFE2L1 =

Protein-coding gene in the species Homo sapiens

Identifiers
- Aliases: NFE2L1, LCR-F1, NRF1, TCF11, nuclear factor, erythroid 2 like 1, NRF-1, NFE2 like bZIP transcription factor 1
- External IDs: OMIM: 163260; MGI: 99421; GeneCards: NFE2L1

Gene location (Human)
Chr.	Chromosome 17 (human)
Band	17q21.32	Start	48,048,329 bp
Band	17q21.32	End	48,061,545 bp

Gene location (Mouse)
Chr.	Chromosome 11 (mouse)
Band	11 D|11 60.12 cM	Start	96,708,240 bp
Band	11 D|11 60.12 cM	End	96,720,794 bp
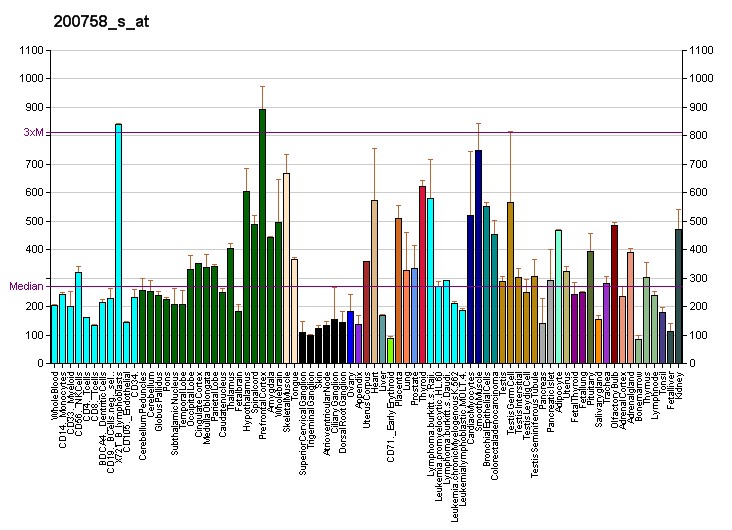

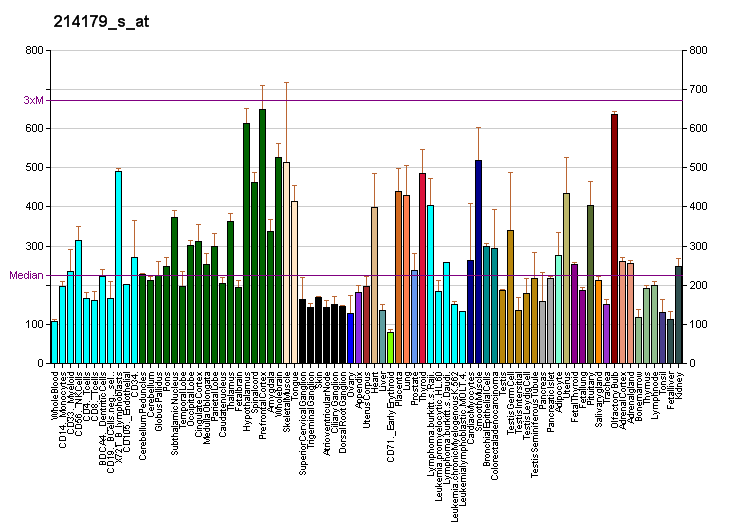

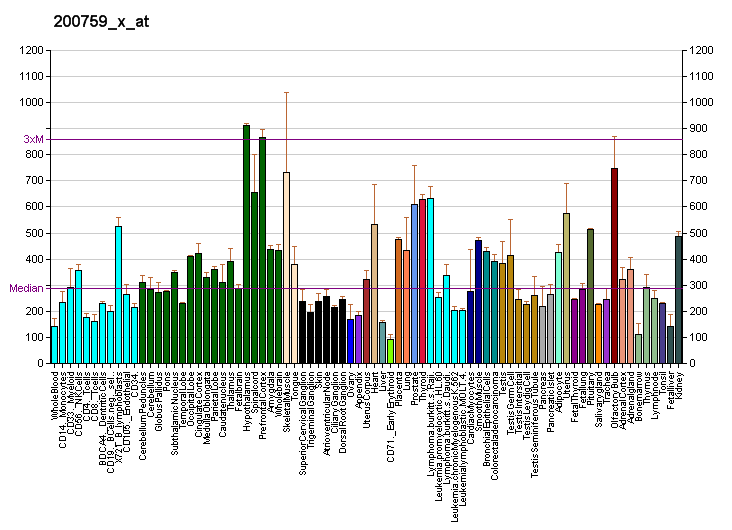
RNA expression pattern
Bgee	Human / Mouse (ortholog); Top expressed in: glutes; gastrocnemius muscle; thoracic diaphragm; skeletal muscle tissue; tibialis anterior muscle; muscle of thigh; Skeletal muscle tissue of rectus abdominis; Skeletal muscle tissue of biceps brachii; Achilles tendon; triceps brachii muscle / Top expressed in: muscle of thigh; neural layer of retina; dentate gyrus of hippocampal formation granule cell; lip; choroid plexus of fourth ventricle; superior frontal gyrus; tail of embryo; primary visual cortex; ankle; genital tubercle; More reference expression data
BioGPS	More reference expression data
Gene ontology
Molecular function	RNA polymerase II cis-regulatory region sequence-specific DNA binding; DNA binding; DNA-binding transcription factor activity; transcription coregulator activity; transcription cis-regulatory region binding; DNA-binding transcription activator activity, RNA polymerase II-specific; protein binding; protein domain specific binding; DNA-binding transcription repressor activity, RNA polymerase II-specific; cholesterol binding; protein heterodimerization activity; lipid binding; protein-containing complex binding; DNA-binding transcription factor activity, RNA polymerase II-specific; chromatin binding; promoter-specific chromatin binding
Cellular component	integral component of membrane; endoplasmic reticulum membrane; membrane; endoplasmic reticulum; nucleus; cytoplasm; cytosol; integral component of endoplasmic reticulum membrane; protein-containing complex
Biological process	regulation of transcription, DNA-templated; regulation of transcription by RNA polymerase II; anatomical structure morphogenesis; transcription, DNA-templated; positive regulation of transcription, DNA-templated; heme biosynthetic process; erythrocyte differentiation; inflammatory response; positive regulation of transcription by RNA polymerase II; negative regulation of transcription by RNA polymerase II; transcription by RNA polymerase II; cellular response to oxidative stress; positive regulation of transcription from RNA polymerase II promoter in response to stress; cell redox homeostasis; lipid homeostasis; cellular response to cholesterol; negative regulation of transcription from RNA polymerase II promoter in response to stress; regulation of odontoblast differentiation; lipid metabolism; steroid metabolic process; cholesterol metabolic process; cholesterol homeostasis; protein polyubiquitination; fructose 6-phosphate metabolic process; glutathione metabolic process; regulation of mitotic nuclear division; regulation of gene expression; regulation of glucose metabolic process; regulation of lipid metabolic process; regulation of fatty acid metabolic process; cellular homeostasis; spinal cord motor neuron differentiation; glial cell fate commitment; response to endoplasmic reticulum stress; cysteine transport; regulation of inflammatory response; glucose 6-phosphate metabolic process; regulation of proteasomal protein catabolic process; cellular response to cold; regulation of nucleus organization; regulation of response to endoplasmic reticulum stress
Sources:Amigo / QuickGO
Orthologs
Databases	NCBI: entry; OMA: entry
Species	Human	Mouse
Entrez	4779	18023
Ensembl	ENSG00000082641	ENSMUSG00000038615
UniProt	Q14494	Q61985
RefSeq (mRNA)	NM_003204; NM_001330261; NM_001330262	NM_001130450; NM_001130451; NM_001130452; NM_001130453; NM_001130454 NM_008686; NM_001361682
RefSeq (protein)	NP_001317190; NP_001317191; NP_003195	NP_001123922; NP_001123923; NP_001123924; NP_001123925; NP_001123926 NP_032712; NP_001348611
Location (UCSC)	Chr 17: 48.05 – 48.06 Mb	Chr 11: 96.71 – 96.72 Mb
PubMed search
- Wikidata
View/Edit Human	View/Edit Mouse

Nuclear factor erythroid 2-related factor 1 (Nrf1) also known as nuclear factor erythroid-2-like 1 (NFE2L1) is a protein that in humans is encoded by the NFE2L1 gene. Since NFE2L1 is also referred to as Nrf1, it is often confused with nuclear respiratory factor 1.

NFE2L1 is a cap 'n' collar, basic-leucine zipper (bZIP) transcription factor. Several isoforms of NFE2L1 have been described for both human and mouse genes. NFE2L1 was first cloned in yeast using a genetic screening method. NFE2L1 is ubiquitously expressed, and high levels of transcript are detected in the heart, kidney, skeletal muscle, fat, and brain. Four separate regions — an asparagine/serine/threonine, acidic domains near the N-terminus, and a serine-rich domain located near the CNC motif — are required for full transactivation function of NFE2L1. NFE2L1 is a key regulator of cellular functions including oxidative stress response, differentiation, inflammatory response, metabolism, cholesterol handling and maintaining proteostasis.

== Interactions ==
NFE2L1 binds DNA as heterodimers with one of small Maf proteins (MAFF, MAFG, MAFK). NFE2L1 has been shown to interact with C-jun.

== Cellular homeostasis ==
NFE2L1 regulates a wide variety of cellular responses, several of which are related to important aspects of protection from stress stimuli. NFE2L1 is involved in providing cellular protection against oxidative stress through the induction of antioxidant genes. The glutathione synthesis pathway is catalyzed by glutamate-cysteine ligase, which contains the catalytic GCLC and regulatory GCLM, and glutathione synthetase (GSS). NFE2L1 was found to regulate Gclm and Gss expression in mouse fibroblasts. Gclm was found to be a direct target of NFE2L1. NFE2L1 also regulates Gclc expression through an indirect mechanism. NFE2L1 knockout mice also exhibit down-regulation of Gpx1-, Hmox1-, and NFE2L1-deficient hepatocytes from liver-specific NFE2L1 knockout mice showed decreased expression of various Gst genes. Metallothioenein-1 and Metallothioenein-2 genes, which protect cells against cytotoxicity induced by toxic metals, are also direct targets of NFE2L1.

NFE2L1 is also involved in maintaining proteostasis. Brains of mice with conditional knockout of NFE2L1 in neuronal cells showed decreased proteasome activity and accumulation of ubiquitin-conjugated proteins, and down regulation of genes encoding the 20S core and 19S regulatory sub-complexes of the 26S proteasome. A similar effect on proteasome gene expression and function was observed in livers of mice with NFE2L1 conditional knockout in hepatocytes. Induction of proteasome genes was also lost in brains and livers of NFE2L1 conditional knockout mice. Re-establishment of NFE2L1 function in NFE2L1 null cells rescued proteasome expression and function, indicating NFE2L1 was necessary for induction of proteasome genes (bounce-back response) in response to proteasome inhibition. This compensatory up-regulation of proteasome genes in response to proteasome inhibition has also been demonstrated to be NFE2L1-dependent in various other cell types. NFE2L1 was shown to directly bind and activate expression of the PsmB6 gene, which encodes a catalytic subunit of the 20S core. In the retina, it was shown that NFE2L1 overexpression increases and knockout reduces proteasomal levels and activity. NFE2L1 was also shown to regulate expression of Herpud1 and Vcp/p97, which are components of the ER-associated degradation pathway.

NFE2L1 also plays a role in metabolic processes. Loss of hepatic NFE2L1 has been shown to result in lipid accumulation, hepatocellular damage, cysteine accumulation, and altered fatty acid composition. Glucose homeostasis and insulin secretion have also been found to be under the control of NFE2L1. Insulin-regulated glycolytic genes—Gck, Aldob, Pgk1, and Pklr, hepatic glucose transporter gene — SLC2A2, and gluconeogenic genes — Fbp1 and Pck1 were repressed in livers of NFE2L1 transgenic mice. NFE2L1 may also play a role in maintaining chromosomal stability and genomic integrity by inducing expression of genes encoding components of the spindle assembly and kinetochore. NFE2L1 has also been shown to sense and respond to excess cholesterol in the ER.

== Regulation ==
NFE2L1 is an ER membrane protein. Its N-terminal domain (NTD) anchors the protein to the membrane. Specifically, amino acid residues 7 to 24 are known to be a hydrophobic domain that serves as a transmembrane region. The concerted mechanism of HRD1, a member of E3-ubiquitin ligase family, and p97/VCP1 was found to play an important role in the degradation of NFE2L1 through the ER Associated Degradation (ERAD) pathway and the release of NFE2L1 from the ER membrane. NFE2L1 is also regulated by other ubiquitin ligases and kinases. FBXW7, a member of the SCF ubiquitin ligase family, targets NFE2L1 for proteolytic degradation by the proteasome. FBXW7 requires the Cdc4 phosphodegron domain within NFE2L1 to be phosphorylated via Glycogen Kinase 3. Casein Kinase 2 was shown to phosphorylate Ser497 of NFE2L1, which attenuates the activity of NFE2L1 on proteasome gene expression. NFE2L1 also interacts with another member of the SCF ligase ubiquitin family known as β-TrCP. β-TrCP also binds to the DSGLC motif, a highly conserved region of CNC-bZIP proteins, in order to polyubiquitinate NFE2L1 prior to its proteolytic degradation. Phosphorylation of Ser599 by protein kinase A enables NFE2L1 and C/EBP-β to dimerize to repress DSPP expression during odontoblast differentiation. NFE2L1 expression and activation is also controlled by cellular stresses. Oxidative stress induced by arsenic and t-butyl hydroquinone leads to accumulation of the NFE2L1 protein inside the nucleus as well as higher activation on antioxidant genes. Treatment with an ER stress inducer, tunicamycin, was shown to induce accumulation of NFE2L1 inside the nucleus; however, it was not associated with increased activity, suggesting further investigation is needed to explain the role of ER stress on NFE2L1. Hypoxia was also shown to increase the expression of NFE2L1 while attenuating expression of the p65 isoform of NFE2L1. Growth factors affect expression of NFE2L1 through an mTORC and SREBP-1 mediated pathway. Growth factors induce higher activity of mTORC, which then promotes activity of its downstream protein SREBP-1, a transcription factor for NFE2L1.

== Animal studies ==
Loss and gain of function studies in mice showed that dysregulation of NFE2L1 leads to pathological states that could have relevance in human diseases. NFE2L1 is crucial for embryonic development and survival of hepatocytes during development. Loss of NFE2L1 in mouse hepatocytes leads to steatosis, inflammation, and tumorigenesis. NFE2L1 is also necessary for neuronal homeostasis. Loss of NFE2L1 function is also associated with insulin resistance. Mice with conditional deletion of NFE2L1 in pancreatic β-cells exhibited severe fasting hyperinsulinemia and glucose intolerance, suggesting that NFE2L1 may play a role in the development of type-2 diabetes. Recent studies showed that Nfe2l1 overexpression is safe and supports viability of photoreceptors in mouse model of human blindness. Analysis of retina specific knockout mice suggests its cell-selective role in supporting RGC viability. Future studies may provide therapeutic efforts involving NFE2L1 for cancer, neurodegeneration, and metabolic diseases.
