= Alpha-tubulin 3C =

Protein-coding gene in the species Homo sapiens

TUBA3C
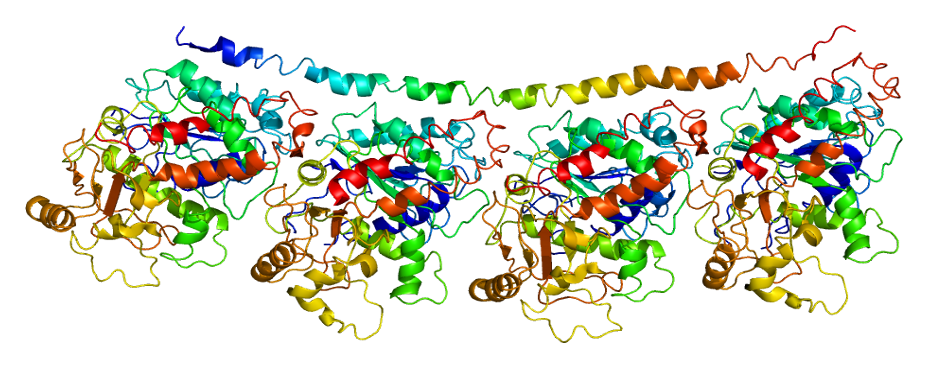

Identifiers
- Aliases: TUBA3C, TUBA2, bA408E5.3, Alpha-tubulin 3C, tubulin alpha 3c
- External IDs: OMIM: 602528; GeneCards: TUBA3C

Gene location (Human)
| Chr. | Chromosome 13 (human) |
| Band | 13q12.11 | Start | 19,173,772 bp |
| Band | 13q12.11 | End | 19,181,824 bp |
RNA expression pattern
| Bgee | Human / Mouse (ortholog); Top expressed in: right testis; left testis; oocyte; male germ cell; sperm; tendon of biceps brachii; triceps brachii muscle; glutes; pons; Skeletal muscle tissue of rectus abdominis / n/a; More reference expression data |
| BioGPS | n/a |
Gene ontology
| Molecular function | nucleotide binding; GTP binding; structural constituent of cytoskeleton; protein binding; GTPase activity |
| Cellular component | cytoplasm; microtubule; cytoskeleton; nucleus; microtubule cytoskeleton; cilium; ciliary basal body |
| Biological process | microtubule-based process; cytoskeleton organization |
Sources:Amigo / QuickGO
Orthologs
| Databases | NCBI: entry; OMA: entry |
| Species | Human | Mouse |
| Entrez | 7278 | n/a |
| Ensembl | ENSG00000198033 | n/a |
| UniProt | Q1ZYQ1; P0DPH8 | n/a |
| RefSeq (mRNA) | NM_079836; NM_006001 | n/a |
| RefSeq (protein) | NP_525125; NP_005992 | n/a |
| Location (UCSC) | Chr 13: 19.17 – 19.18 Mb | n/a |
| PubMed search | | n/a |
- Wikidata
| View/Edit Human |

Tubulin alpha-3C/D chain is a protein that in humans is encoded by the TUBA3C gene.

== Function ==
Microtubules of the eukaryotic cytoskeleton perform essential and diverse functions and are composed of a heterodimer of alpha and beta tubulin. The genes encoding these microtubule constituents are part of the tubulin superfamily, which is composed of six distinct families. Genes from the alpha, beta and gamma tubulin families are found in all eukaryotes. The alpha and beta tubulins represent the major components of microtubules, while gamma tubulin plays a critical role in the nucleation of microtubule assembly. There are multiple alpha and beta tubulin genes and they are highly conserved among and between species. This gene is an alpha tubulin gene that encodes a protein 99% to the mouse testis-specific Tuba3 and Tuba7 gene products. This gene is located in the 13q11 region, which is associated with the genetic diseases Clouston hidrotic ectodermal dysplasia and Kabuki syndrome. Alternative splicing has been observed for this gene and two variants have been identified.

== Interactions ==
Alpha-tubulin 3C has been shown to interact with FYN and NMI.
