= IFI35 =

Protein-coding gene in the species Homo sapiens

Identifiers
- Aliases: IFI35, IFP35, interferon induced protein 35
- External IDs: OMIM: 600735; MGI: 1917360; GeneCards: IFI35

Gene location (Human)
Chr.	Chromosome 17 (human)
Band	17q21.31	Start	43,006,740 bp
Band	17q21.31	End	43,014,456 bp

Gene location (Mouse)
Chr.	Chromosome 11 (mouse)
Band	11|11 D	Start	101,339,233 bp
Band	11|11 D	End	101,349,524 bp
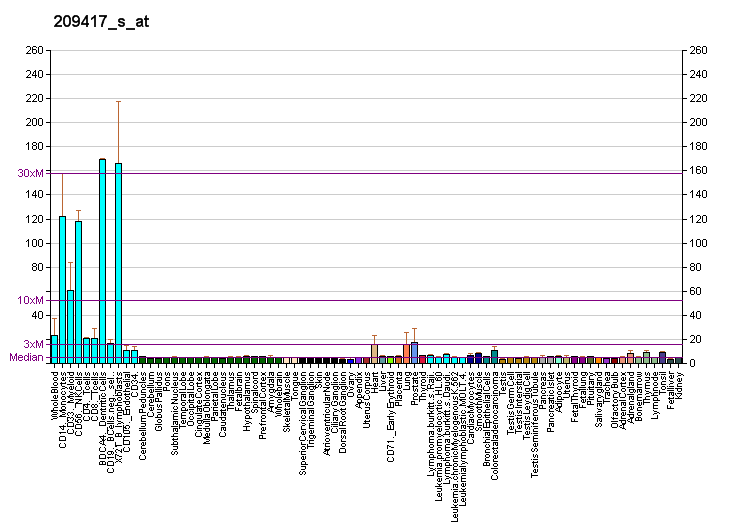
RNA expression pattern
Bgee	Human / Mouse (ortholog); Top expressed in: granulocyte; monocyte; decidua; right adrenal gland; right adrenal cortex; left adrenal cortex; mucosa of transverse colon; apex of heart; spleen; gallbladder / Top expressed in: right lung lobe; endothelial cell of lymphatic vessel; carotid body; iris; conjunctival fornix; lacrimal gland; submandibular gland; blood; Paneth cell; epithelium of stomach; More reference expression data
BioGPS	More reference expression data
Gene ontology
Molecular function	protein binding
Cellular component	cytosol; nucleus
Biological process	type I interferon signaling pathway
Sources:Amigo / QuickGO
Orthologs
Databases	NCBI: entry; OMA: entry
Species	Human	Mouse
Entrez	3430	70110
Ensembl	ENSG00000068079	ENSMUSG00000010358
UniProt	P80217	Q9D8C4
RefSeq (mRNA)	NM_005533; NM_001330230	NM_027320
RefSeq (protein)	NP_001317159; NP_005524	NP_081596
Location (UCSC)	Chr 17: 43.01 – 43.01 Mb	Chr 11: 101.34 – 101.35 Mb
PubMed search
- Wikidata
View/Edit Human	View/Edit Mouse

Interferon-induced 35 kDa protein is a protein that in humans is encoded by the IFI35 gene.

== Interactions ==
IFI35 has been shown to interact with NMI and BATF.
