= NFE2L3 =

Protein-coding gene in the species Homo sapiens

Identifiers
- Aliases: NFE2L3, NRF3, nuclear factor, erythroid 2 like 3, NFE2 like bZIP transcription factor 3
- External IDs: OMIM: 604135; MGI: 1339958; GeneCards: NFE2L3

Gene location (Human)
Chr.	Chromosome 7 (human)
Band	7p15.2	Start	26,152,198 bp
Band	7p15.2	End	26,187,137 bp

Gene location (Mouse)
Chr.	Chromosome 6 (mouse)
Band	6 B3|6 24.84 cM	Start	51,409,650 bp
Band	6 B3|6 24.84 cM	End	51,435,748 bp
RNA expression pattern
Bgee	Human / Mouse (ortholog); Top expressed in: gonad; placenta; body of pancreas; cerebellar hemisphere; right hemisphere of cerebellum; epithelium of colon; Achilles tendon; olfactory zone of nasal mucosa; appendix; rectum / Top expressed in: transitional epithelium of urinary bladder; hair follicle; lumbar subsegment of spinal cord; superior cervical ganglion; corneal stroma; lip; skin of external ear; conjunctival fornix; skin of back; olfactory epithelium; More reference expression data
BioGPS	n/a
Gene ontology
Molecular function	DNA-binding transcription factor activity; RNA polymerase II cis-regulatory region sequence-specific DNA binding; DNA binding; transcription coactivator activity; DNA-binding transcription repressor activity, RNA polymerase II-specific; protein binding; transcription cis-regulatory region binding; DNA-binding transcription factor activity, RNA polymerase II-specific
Cellular component	cytoplasm; nucleus
Biological process	regulation of transcription by RNA polymerase II; positive regulation of transcription, DNA-templated; regulation of transcription, DNA-templated; negative regulation of transcription by RNA polymerase II; transcription by RNA polymerase II; transcription, DNA-templated
Sources:Amigo / QuickGO
Orthologs
Databases	NCBI: entry; OMA: entry
Species	Human	Mouse
Entrez	9603	18025
Ensembl	ENSG00000050344	ENSMUSG00000029832
UniProt	Q9Y4A8	Q9WTM4
RefSeq (mRNA)	NM_004289	NM_010903
RefSeq (protein)	NP_004280	NP_035033
Location (UCSC)	Chr 7: 26.15 – 26.19 Mb	Chr 6: 51.41 – 51.44 Mb
PubMed search
- Wikidata
View/Edit Human	View/Edit Mouse

Nuclear factor (erythroid 2)-like factor 3, also known as NFE2L3 or 'NRF3', is a transcription factor that in humans is encoded by the Nfe2l3 gene.

Nrf3 is a basic leucine zipper (bZIP) transcription factor belonging to the Cap 'n' Collar (CNC) family of proteins. In 1989, the first CNC transcription factor NFE2L2 was identified. Subsequently, several related proteins were identified, including NFE2L1 and NFE2L3, in different organisms such as humans, mice, and zebrafish. These proteins are specifically encoded in the humans by Nfe2l1 and Nfe2l3 genes respectively.

== Gene ==
The Nfe2l3 gene was mapped to the chromosomal location 7p15-p14 by fluorescence in situ hybridization (FISH). It covers 34.93 kB from base 26191830 to 26226754 on the direct DNA strand with an exon count of 4. The gene is found near the HOXA gene cluster, similar to the clustering of p45 NF-E2, NFE2L1, and NFE2L2 near HOXC, HOXB, and HOXD genes respectively. This implies that all four genes were likely derived from a single ancestral gene which was duplicated alongside the ancestral HOX cluster, diverging to give rise to four closely related transcription factors.

The human Nfe2l3 gene encodes a 694 amino acid residue sequence. From bioinformatic analysis, it has been observed that the NRF3 protein shows a high degree of conservation through its evolutionary pathway from zebrafish to humans. Key conserved domains such as N-terminal homology box 1 (NHB1), N-terminal homology box 2 (NHB2), and the CNC domain allude to the conserved functional properties of this transcription factor.

== Sub-cellular location ==
NRF3 is a membrane bound glycoprotein that can be targeted specifically to the endoplasmic reticulum (ER) and the nuclear membrane. Biochemical studies have identified three migrating endogenous forms of NRF3 protein – A, B, and C – which are constitutively degraded by several proteolytic mechanisms. It is known that the "A" form is glycosylated, whereas "B" is unglycosylated, and "C" is generated by cleavage of "B." In total, seven potential sites of N-linked glycosylation has been observed in the center portion of the NRF3 protein. However, further details of the three forms' location, regulation, and function in each cellular compartment remain unknown.

== Protein expression levels ==
Expression levels of NRF3 proteins are highest in the placenta. more specifically in the chorionic villi (at week 12 of gestation period) Expression appears to be specific to primary placental cytotrophoblasts, not placental fibroblasts. Along with the placenta, the expression of this protein has also been observed in human choriocarcinoma cell lines which have been derived from trophoblastic tumours of the placenta. NFE2L2 has also been found in the heart, brain, lungs, kidney, pancreas, colon, thymus, leukocytes, and spleen. Very low levels of expression were found in human megakaryocytes and erythrocytes, and NRF3 expression was not observed in reproductive organs of either sex.

== Function ==
The specific functions of the NRF3 protein are still unknown, but some putative functional properties have been inferred from those of NFE2L1 due to their structural similarity. It is known that NRF3 can heterodimerize with small musculo-aponeurotic fibro-sarcoma (MAF genes) factors to bind antioxidant response elements in target genes.

== Associated diseases ==
RNA microarray data has shown NRF3's involvement in various malignancies, with over-expression observed in Hodgkin's lymphoma, non-Hodgkin lymphoma, and mantle cell lymphoma. NRF3 expression is also elevated in human breast cancer cells and testicular carcinoma, implying that NRF3 may play a role in inducing carcinogenesis.
