= BATF (gene) =

Protein-coding gene in the species Homo sapiens

Identifiers
- Aliases: BATF, B-ATF, BATF1, SFA-2, SFA2, basic leucine zipper ATF-like transcription factor
- External IDs: OMIM: 612476; MGI: 1859147; GeneCards: BATF

Gene location (Human)
Chr.	Chromosome 14 (human)
Band	14q24.3	Start	75,522,455 bp
Band	14q24.3	End	75,546,993 bp

Gene location (Mouse)
Chr.	Chromosome 12 (mouse)
Band	12|12 D2	Start	85,733,443 bp
Band	12|12 D2	End	85,755,861 bp
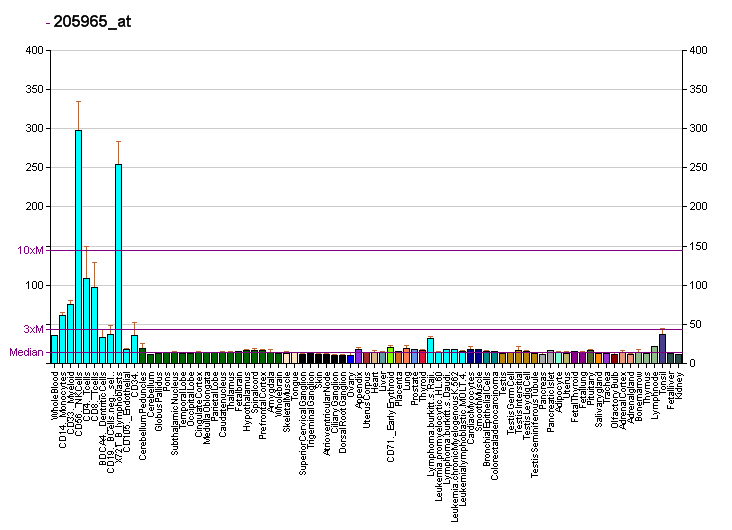
RNA expression pattern
Bgee	Human / Mouse (ortholog); Top expressed in: granulocyte; blood; monocyte; spleen; lymph node; appendix; palpebral conjunctiva; testicle; bone marrow; olfactory zone of nasal mucosa / Top expressed in: granulocyte; embryo; spleen; embryo; lymph node; blood; mesenteric lymph nodes; thymus; parotid gland; subcutaneous adipose tissue; More reference expression data
BioGPS	More reference expression data
Gene ontology
Molecular function	protein binding; DNA-binding transcription activator activity, RNA polymerase II-specific; DNA binding; sequence-specific DNA binding; DNA-binding transcription factor activity; RNA polymerase II cis-regulatory region sequence-specific DNA binding; DNA-binding transcription factor activity, RNA polymerase II-specific
Cellular component	cytoplasm; nucleoplasm; nucleus
Biological process	regulation of transcription by RNA polymerase II; cell differentiation; regulation of transcription, DNA-templated; transcription, DNA-templated; transcription by RNA polymerase II; positive regulation of transcription by RNA polymerase II; T-helper 2 cell differentiation; cytokine production; DNA damage response, signal transduction by p53 class mediator; myeloid dendritic cell differentiation; lymphoid progenitor cell differentiation; T-helper 17 cell lineage commitment; cellular response to DNA damage stimulus; hematopoietic stem cell differentiation; isotype switching; T-helper 17 cell differentiation; defense response to protozoan; cytokine-mediated signaling pathway
Sources:Amigo / QuickGO
Orthologs
Databases	NCBI: entry; OMA: entry
Species	Human	Mouse
Entrez	10538	53314
Ensembl	ENSG00000156127	ENSMUSG00000034266
UniProt	Q16520	O35284
RefSeq (mRNA)	NM_006399	NM_016767
RefSeq (protein)	NP_006390	NP_058047
Location (UCSC)	Chr 14: 75.52 – 75.55 Mb	Chr 12: 85.73 – 85.76 Mb
PubMed search
- Wikidata
View/Edit Human	View/Edit Mouse

Basic leucine zipper transcription factor, ATF-like, also known as BATF, is a protein which in humans is encoded by the BATF gene.

== Function ==
The protein encoded by this gene is a nuclear basic leucine zipper (bZIP) protein that belongs to the AP-1/ATF superfamily of transcription factors. The leucine zipper of this protein mediates dimerization with members of the Jun family of proteins. This protein is thought to be a negative regulator of AP-1/ATF transcriptional events.

Mice without the BATF gene (BATF knockout mice) lacked a type of inflammatory immune cell (Th17) and were resistant to conditions that normally induces an autoimmune condition similar to multiple sclerosis.

== Interactions ==
BATF (gene) has been shown to interact with IFI35.
