= Transcription factor MafA =

Protein-coding gene in humans

MAFA

Identifiers
- Aliases: MAFA, RIPE3b1, hMafA, MAF bZIP transcription factor A, INSDM
- External IDs: OMIM: 610303; MGI: 2673307; GeneCards: MAFA
Available structures
PDB	Ortholog search: PDBe RCSB
PDB	List of PDB id codes 4EOT

Gene location (Human)
Chr.	Chromosome 8 (human)
Band	8q24.3	Start	143,419,182 bp
Band	8q24.3	End	143,430,732 bp

Gene location (Mouse)
Chr.	Chromosome 15 (mouse)
Band	15|15 D3	Start	75,617,339 bp
Band	15|15 D3	End	75,620,077 bp
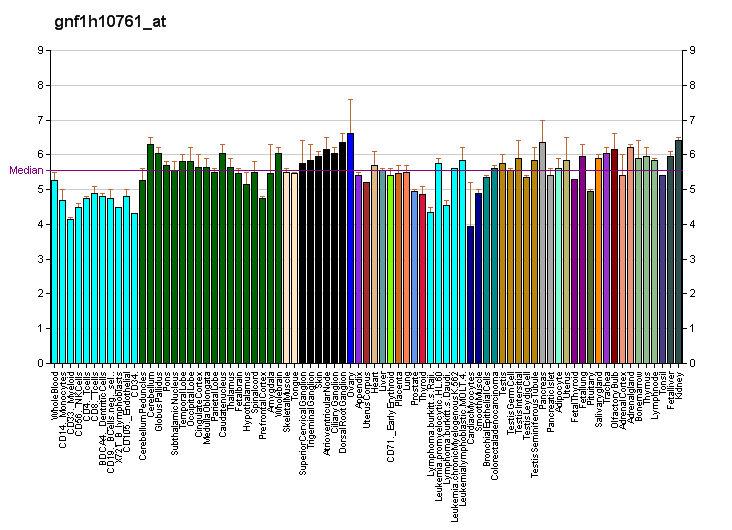
RNA expression pattern
Bgee	Human / Mouse (ortholog); Top expressed in: muscle of thigh; gastrocnemius muscle; skeletal muscle tissue; gonad; islet of Langerhans; testicle; right testis; left testis; body of pancreas; placenta / Top expressed in: islet of Langerhans; vastus lateralis muscle; triceps brachii muscle; sternocleidomastoid muscle; temporal muscle; ankle; gastrocnemius muscle; tibialis anterior muscle; muscle of thigh; digastric muscle; More reference expression data
BioGPS	More reference expression data
Gene ontology
Molecular function	DNA-binding transcription factor activity; protein heterodimerization activity; DNA binding; DNA-binding transcription activator activity, RNA polymerase II-specific; RNA polymerase II cis-regulatory region sequence-specific DNA binding; protein homodimerization activity; DNA-binding transcription factor activity, RNA polymerase II-specific; sequence-specific DNA binding
Cellular component	nucleus
Biological process	regulation of transcription, DNA-templated; response to glucose; insulin secretion; transcription by RNA polymerase II; positive regulation of transcription by RNA polymerase II; positive regulation of transcription, DNA-templated; nitric oxide mediated signal transduction; transcription, DNA-templated
Sources:Amigo / QuickGO
Orthologs
Databases	NCBI: entry; OMA: entry
Species	Human	Mouse
Entrez	389692	378435
Ensembl	ENSG00000182759	ENSMUSG00000047591
UniProt	Q8NHW3	Q8CF90
RefSeq (mRNA)	NM_201589	NM_194350
RefSeq (protein)	NP_963883	NP_919331
Location (UCSC)	Chr 8: 143.42 – 143.43 Mb	Chr 15: 75.62 – 75.62 Mb
PubMed search
- Wikidata
View/Edit Human	View/Edit Mouse

Transcription factor MafA is a protein that in humans is encoded by the MAFA gene. It is a member of the Maf family of transcription factors.

== Tissue distribution ==
In addition to its expression in pancreatic ßcells, MAFA is also expressed in specific subsets of excitatory and inhibitory neurons. In the peripheric nervous system, it is expressed in touch mechanoreceptors. In the central nervous system, Mafa is expressed in sensory neurons in the spinal cord and trigeminal nucleus, as well as in the olfactory bulb. It is also present in ventral inhibitory neurons of the spinal cord (Renshaw cells) and in brainstem inhibitory neurons controlling mouse neonatal apneas.

== Regulation ==
MAFA is phosphorylated sequentially on four serine/threonine residues by GSK-3 kinase. These phosphorylations activate MAFA transcription and trigger its degradation in the proteasome. Altering these post-translationnal modifications leads to severe pathological consequences. Mutation of these residues is perinatally lethal in mice, and mutation of the Ser64Phe priming site was reported to induce familial diabetes mellitus and insulinomatosis in humans.

== Function ==
An in vivo study on mice proved MafA binds to the promoter in an insulin gene to regulate insulin transcription in response to serum glucose levels. MafA is a β cell-specific activator, which differentiates it from other transcription factors involved with insulin gene expression. It helps regulate the β cells involved with insulin secretion primarily by maintaining β cell metabolism. The amount of MafA in the β cells is regulated by levels of glucose and oxidative stress.

== Interactions ==
MafA has been shown to interact with NEUROD1 and Pdx1. MafA works with Pdx1 to activate the insulin gene.
