= BACH1 =

Protein-coding gene in the species Homo sapiens

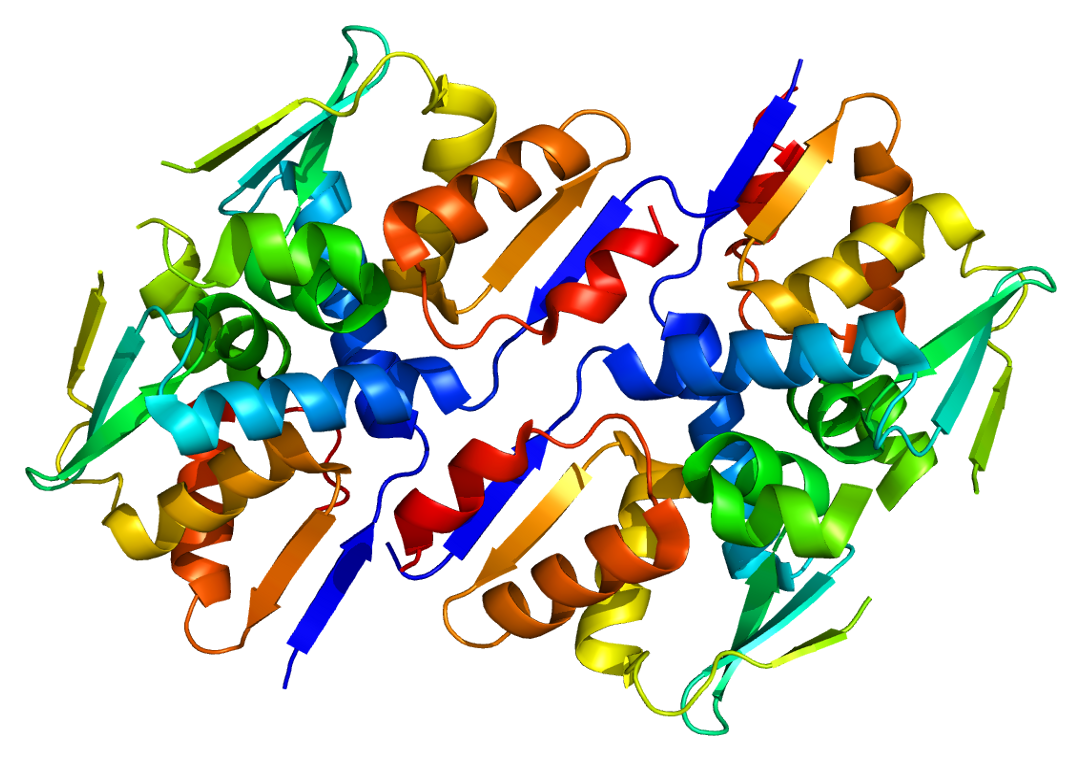

Identifiers
- Aliases: BACH1, BACH-1, BTBD24, BTB domain and CNC homolog 1
- External IDs: OMIM: 602751; MGI: 894680; GeneCards: BACH1
Available structures
PDB	Ortholog search: PDBe RCSB
PDB	List of PDB id codes 2IHC

Gene location (Human)
Chr.	Chromosome 21 (human)
Band	21q21.3	Start	29,194,071 bp
Band	21q21.3	End	29,630,751 bp

Gene location (Mouse)
Chr.	Chromosome 16 (mouse)
Band	16|16 C3.3	Start	87,495,833 bp
Band	16|16 C3.3	End	87,530,234 bp
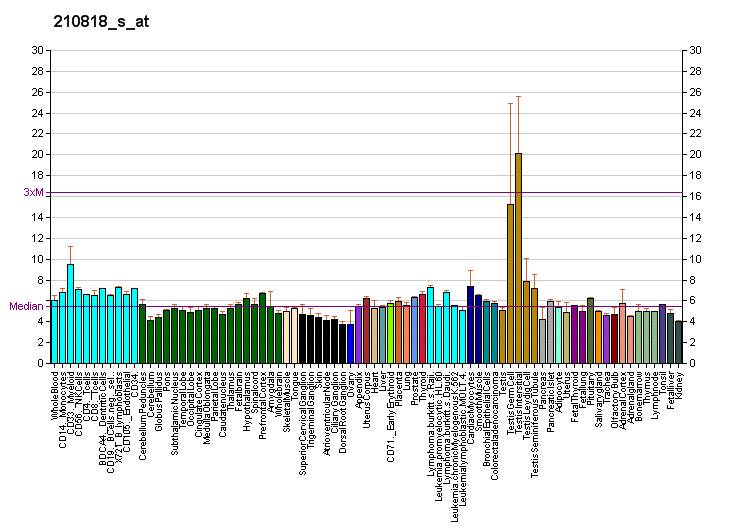

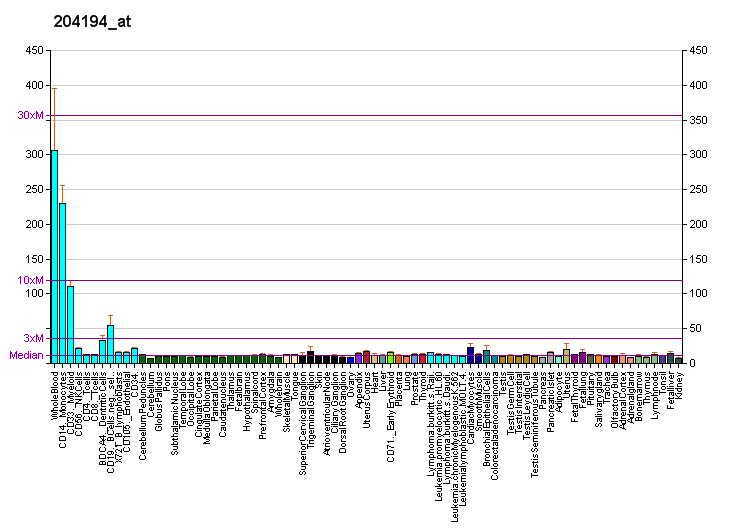
RNA expression pattern
Bgee	Human / Mouse (ortholog); Top expressed in: secondary oocyte; monocyte; Achilles tendon; bone marrow cell; blood; stromal cell of endometrium; sperm; granulocyte; cartilage tissue; amniotic fluid / Top expressed in: epithelium of small intestine; intestinal villus; Ileal epithelium; left lung lobe; superior cervical ganglion; decidua; conjunctival fornix; external carotid artery; medial ganglionic eminence; stroma of bone marrow; More reference expression data
BioGPS	More reference expression data
Gene ontology
Molecular function	RNA polymerase II cis-regulatory region sequence-specific DNA binding; DNA binding; DNA-binding transcription factor activity; ubiquitin-protein transferase activity; DNA-binding transcription repressor activity, RNA polymerase II-specific; DNA-binding transcription activator activity, RNA polymerase II-specific; protein binding; heme binding; DNA-binding transcription factor activity, RNA polymerase II-specific
Cellular component	cytoplasm; cytosol; Cul3-RING ubiquitin ligase complex; nucleus
Biological process	regulation of transcription, DNA-templated; negative regulation of transcription by RNA polymerase II; regulation of transcription involved in G1/S transition of mitotic cell cycle; transcription, DNA-templated; regulation of transcription from RNA polymerase II promoter in response to hypoxia; DNA repair; positive regulation of transcription by RNA polymerase II; regulation of transcription involved in G2/M transition of mitotic cell cycle; protein ubiquitination; transcription by RNA polymerase II
Sources:Amigo / QuickGO
Orthologs
Databases	NCBI: entry; OMA: entry
Species	Human	Mouse
Entrez	571	12013
Ensembl	ENSG00000156273	ENSMUSG00000025612
UniProt	O14867	P97302
RefSeq (mRNA)	NM_001011545; NM_001186; NM_206866	NM_007520
RefSeq (protein)	NP_001177; NP_996749	NP_031546
Location (UCSC)	Chr 21: 29.19 – 29.63 Mb	Chr 16: 87.5 – 87.53 Mb
PubMed search
- Wikidata
View/Edit Human	View/Edit Mouse

Transcription regulator protein BACH1 is a protein that in humans is encoded by the BACH1 gene.

== Function ==
This gene encodes a transcription factor that belongs to the cap'n'collar type of basic region leucine zipper factor family (CNC-bZip). The encoded protein contains broad complex, tramtrack, bric-a-brac/poxvirus and zinc finger (BTB/POZ) domains, which is atypical of CNC-bZip family members. These BTB/POZ domains facilitate protein-protein interactions and formation of homo- and/or hetero-oligomers. The C-terminus of the protein is a leucine zipper of the bzip_maf family. When this protein forms a heterodimer with MafK, it functions as a repressor of Maf recognition element (MARE) and transcription is repressed. Multiple alternatively spliced transcript variants have been identified for this gene. Some exons of this gene overlap with some exons from the GRIK1-AS2 gene, which is transcribed in an opposite orientation to this gene but does not encode a protein.

== See also ==
- GRIK1
- Small Maf (sMaf)
  - Bach1-sMaf heterodimer
