= BATF2 =

Protein-coding gene in humans

Identifiers
- Aliases: BATF2, SARI, basic leucine zipper ATF-like transcription factor 2
- External IDs: OMIM: 614983; MGI: 1921731; GeneCards: BATF2

Gene location (Human)
Chr.	Chromosome 11 (human)
Band	11q13.1	Start	64,987,945 bp
Band	11q13.1	End	64,997,018 bp

Gene location (Mouse)
Chr.	Chromosome 19 (mouse)
Band	19|19 A	Start	6,191,013 bp
Band	19|19 A	End	6,222,506 bp
RNA expression pattern
Bgee	Human / Mouse (ortholog); Top expressed in: pancreatic ductal cell; oocyte; mucosa of transverse colon; gonad; secondary oocyte; testicle; spleen; appendix; apex of heart; body of pancreas / Top expressed in: intestinal villus; jejunum; mucous cell of stomach; duodenum; crypt of lieberkuhn of small intestine; colon; left colon; ileum; intercostal muscle; embryo; More reference expression data
BioGPS	n/a
Gene ontology
Molecular function	DNA-binding transcription factor activity; DNA binding; protein binding; DNA-binding transcription factor activity, RNA polymerase II-specific; RNA polymerase II cis-regulatory region sequence-specific DNA binding
Cellular component	nucleus
Biological process	regulation of transcription by RNA polymerase II; cell differentiation; regulation of transcription, DNA-templated; transcription, DNA-templated; myeloid dendritic cell differentiation; defense response to protozoan
Sources:Amigo / QuickGO
Orthologs
Databases	NCBI: entry; OMA: entry
Species	Human	Mouse
Entrez	116071	74481
Ensembl	ENSG00000168062	ENSMUSG00000039699
UniProt	Q8N1L9	Q8R1H8
RefSeq (mRNA)	NM_001300807; NM_001300808; NM_138456	NM_028967; NM_001356604; NM_001379529
RefSeq (protein)	NP_001287736; NP_001287737; NP_612465	NP_083243; NP_001343533; NP_001366458
Location (UCSC)	Chr 11: 64.99 – 65 Mb	Chr 19: 6.19 – 6.22 Mb
PubMed search
- Wikidata
View/Edit Human	View/Edit Mouse

Basic leucine zipper transcription factor, ATF-like 2 is a protein that, in humans, is encoded by the BATF2 gene.
