= GCLM =

Protein-coding gene in humans

Identifiers
- Aliases: GCLM, GLCLR, glutamate-cysteine ligase modifier subunit
- External IDs: OMIM: 601176; MGI: 104995; GeneCards: GCLM

Gene location (Human)
Chr.	Chromosome 1 (human)
Band	1p22.1	Start	93,885,199 bp
Band	1p22.1	End	93,909,456 bp

Gene location (Mouse)
Chr.	Chromosome 3 (mouse)
Band	3 G1|3 52.94 cM	Start	122,039,206 bp
Band	3 G1|3 52.94 cM	End	122,064,381 bp
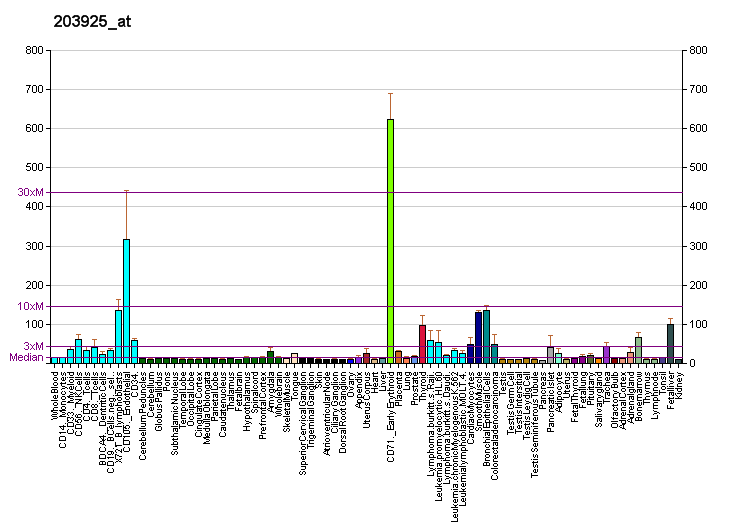
RNA expression pattern
Bgee	Human / Mouse (ortholog); Top expressed in: bronchial epithelial cell; islet of Langerhans; jejunal mucosa; hair follicle; secondary oocyte; cartilage tissue; Skeletal muscle tissue of rectus abdominis; epithelium of nasopharynx; duodenum; trabecular bone / Top expressed in: right kidney; stroma of bone marrow; blood; fetal liver hematopoietic progenitor cell; left lobe of liver; human kidney; tibiofemoral joint; pyloric antrum; lacrimal gland; facial motor nucleus; More reference expression data
BioGPS	More reference expression data
Gene ontology
Molecular function	enzyme regulator activity; glutamate-cysteine ligase catalytic subunit binding; protein heterodimerization activity; glutamate-cysteine ligase activity
Cellular component	cytosol; glutamate-cysteine ligase complex
Biological process	negative regulation of neuron apoptotic process; glutathione metabolic process; cysteine metabolic process; negative regulation of extrinsic apoptotic signaling pathway; regulation of mitochondrial depolarization; apoptotic mitochondrial changes; response to nitrosative stress; glutamate metabolic process; glutathione biosynthetic process; positive regulation of glutamate-cysteine ligase activity; response to oxidative stress; ageing; cellular response to thyroxine stimulus; hepatic stellate cell activation; cellular response to follicle-stimulating hormone stimulus; cellular response to fibroblast growth factor stimulus; response to human chorionic gonadotropin; response to nutrient; response to activity; cellular response to hepatocyte growth factor stimulus; cellular response to glucose stimulus; cellular response to leukemia inhibitory factor
Sources:Amigo / QuickGO
Orthologs
Databases	NCBI: entry; OMA: entry
Species	Human	Mouse
Entrez	2730	14630
Ensembl	ENSG00000023909	ENSMUSG00000028124
UniProt	P48507	O09172
RefSeq (mRNA)	NM_001308253; NM_002061	NM_008129
RefSeq (protein)	NP_001295182; NP_002052	NP_032155
Location (UCSC)	Chr 1: 93.89 – 93.91 Mb	Chr 3: 122.04 – 122.06 Mb
PubMed search
- Wikidata
View/Edit Human	View/Edit Mouse

Glutamate-cysteine ligase regulatory subunit is an enzyme that in humans is encoded by the GCLM gene.

Glutamate-cysteine ligase, also known as gamma-glutamylcysteine synthetase, is the first rate limiting enzyme of glutathione synthesis. The enzyme consists of two subunits, a heavy catalytic subunit and a light regulatory subunit. Gamma glutamylcysteine synthetase deficiency has been implicated in some forms of hemolytic anemia.
