= BACH2 =

Protein-coding gene in the species Homo sapiens

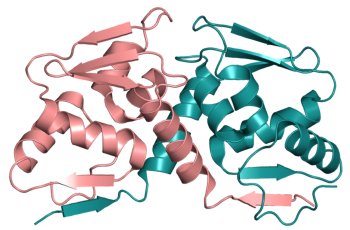

Identifiers
- Aliases: BACH2, BTBD25, BTB domain and CNC homolog 2, IMD60
- External IDs: OMIM: 605394; MGI: 894679; GeneCards: BACH2
Available structures
| PDB | Ortholog search: PDBe RCSB |
| PDB | List of PDB id codes 3OHU, 3OHV |

Gene location (Human)
| Chr. | Chromosome 6 (human) |
| Band | 6q15 | Start | 89,926,528 bp |
| Band | 6q15 | End | 90,296,843 bp |

Gene location (Mouse)
| Chr. | Chromosome 4 (mouse) |
| Band | 4|4 A5 | Start | 32,238,804 bp |
| Band | 4|4 A5 | End | 32,586,108 bp |
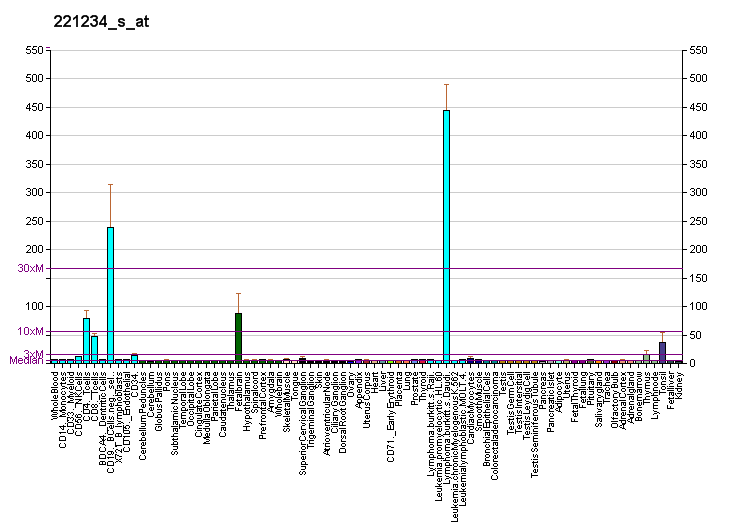
RNA expression pattern
| Bgee | Human / Mouse (ortholog); Top expressed in: sural nerve; epithelium of nasopharynx; oocyte; bone marrow; secondary oocyte; thymus; ganglionic eminence; tonsil; lymph node; ventricular zone / Top expressed in: zygote; mesenteric lymph nodes; trigeminal ganglion; Rostral migratory stream; blood; tibiofemoral joint; spleen; hand; hair follicle; ganglionic eminence; More reference expression data |
| BioGPS | More reference expression data |
Gene ontology
| Molecular function | DNA-binding transcription factor activity; RNA polymerase II cis-regulatory region sequence-specific DNA binding; DNA binding; DNA-binding transcription repressor activity, RNA polymerase II-specific; ubiquitin-protein transferase activity; DNA-binding transcription factor activity, RNA polymerase II-specific |
| Cellular component | cytoplasm; Cul3-RING ubiquitin ligase complex; nucleus; cytosol |
| Biological process | regulation of transcription, DNA-templated; negative regulation of transcription by RNA polymerase II; transcription by RNA polymerase II; transcription, DNA-templated; protein ubiquitination; import into nucleus |
Sources:Amigo / QuickGO
Orthologs
| Databases | NCBI: entry; OMA: entry |
| Species | Human | Mouse |
| Entrez | 60468 | 12014 |
| Ensembl | ENSG00000112182 | ENSMUSG00000040270 |
| UniProt | Q9BYV9 | P97303 |
| RefSeq (mRNA) | NM_001170794; NM_021813 | NM_001109661; NM_007521 |
| RefSeq (protein) | NP_001164265; NP_068585 | NP_001103131 |
| Location (UCSC) | Chr 6: 89.93 – 90.3 Mb | Chr 4: 32.24 – 32.59 Mb |
| PubMed search |
- Wikidata
| View/Edit Human | View/Edit Mouse |

Transcription regulator protein BACH2 (broad complex-tramtrack-bric a brac and Cap'n'collar homology 2) is a protein that in humans is encoded by the BACH2 gene. It contains a BTB/POZ domain at its N-terminus which forms a disulphide-linked dimer and a bZip_Maf domain at the C-terminus.
