= MAF (gene) =

Protein-coding gene in the species Homo sapiens

Identifiers
- Aliases: MAF, CCA4, c-AYGRP, CTRCT21, MAF bZIP transcription factor
- External IDs: OMIM: 177075; MGI: 96909; GeneCards: MAF

Gene location (Human)
Chr.	Chromosome 16 (human)
Band	16q23.2	Start	79,585,843 bp
Band	16q23.2	End	79,600,737 bp

Gene location (Mouse)
Chr.	Chromosome 8 (mouse)
Band	8 E1|8 62.61 cM	Start	116,409,681 bp
Band	8 E1|8 62.61 cM	End	116,434,533 bp
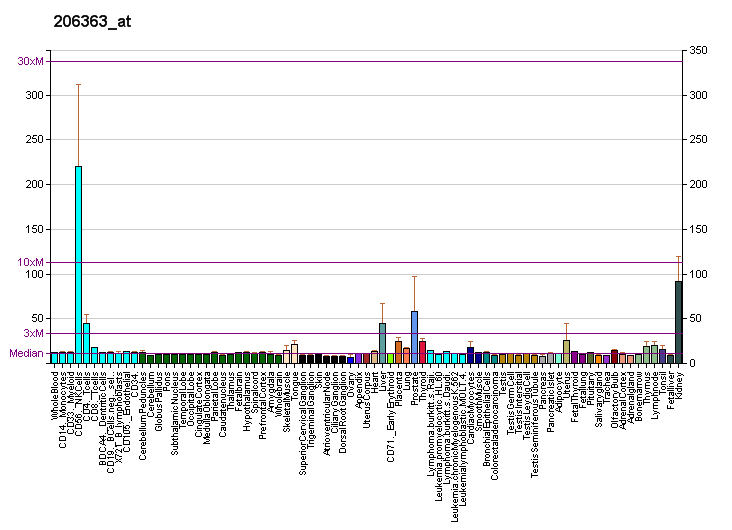

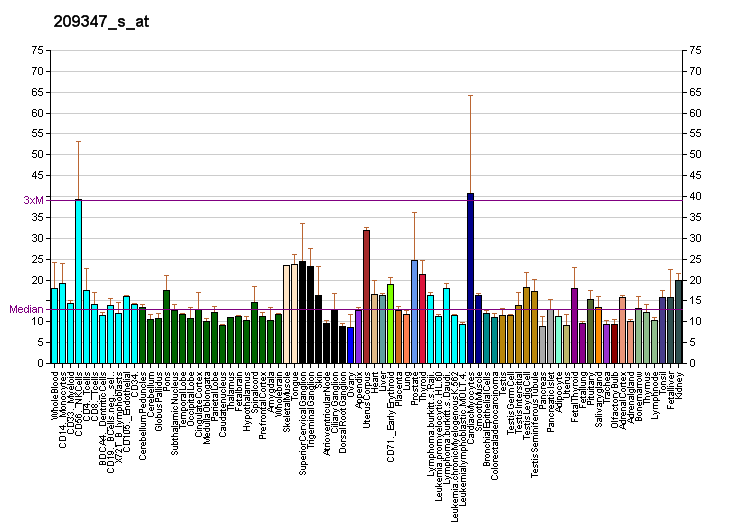
RNA expression pattern
Bgee	Human / Mouse (ortholog); Top expressed in: jejunal mucosa; germinal epithelium; gums; gingival epithelium; trigeminal ganglion; skin of hip; parietal pleura; human penis; periodontal fiber; vulva / Top expressed in: stroma of bone marrow; skin of external ear; molar; umbilical cord; epithelium of lens; left lung lobe; body of femur; migratory enteric neural crest cell; mesenteric lymph nodes; human fetus; More reference expression data
BioGPS	More reference expression data
Gene ontology
Molecular function	DNA-binding transcription factor activity; sequence-specific DNA binding; DNA binding; protein binding; DNA-binding transcription activator activity, RNA polymerase II-specific; DNA-binding transcription factor activity, RNA polymerase II-specific; RNA polymerase II cis-regulatory region sequence-specific DNA binding
Cellular component	cytoplasm; chromatin; nucleus
Biological process	inner ear development; cytokine production; regulation of chondrocyte differentiation; positive regulation of gene expression; lens development in camera-type eye; lens fiber cell differentiation; negative regulation of transcription by RNA polymerase II; regulation of transcription, DNA-templated; cell development; transcription, DNA-templated; positive regulation of transcription by RNA polymerase II; transcription by RNA polymerase II
Sources:Amigo / QuickGO
Orthologs
Databases	NCBI: entry; OMA: entry
Species	Human	Mouse
Entrez	4094	17132
Ensembl	ENSG00000178573	ENSMUSG00000055435
UniProt	O75444	P54843
RefSeq (mRNA)	NM_001031804; NM_005360	NM_001025577
RefSeq (protein)	NP_001026974; NP_005351	NP_001020748
Location (UCSC)	Chr 16: 79.59 – 79.6 Mb	Chr 8: 116.41 – 116.43 Mb
PubMed search
- Wikidata
View/Edit Human	View/Edit Mouse

Transcription factor Maf, also known as proto-oncogene c-Maf or V-maf musculoaponeurotic fibrosarcoma oncogene homolog, is a transcription factor that in humans is encoded by the MAF gene.

== Types ==
One type, MafA, also known as RIPE3b1, promotes pancreatic development, as well as insulin gene transcription.

== Interactions ==
MAF has been shown to interact with:

- CREBBP
- EP300
- MYB
- SOX9.
