= NFE2 =

Protein-coding gene in the species Homo sapiens

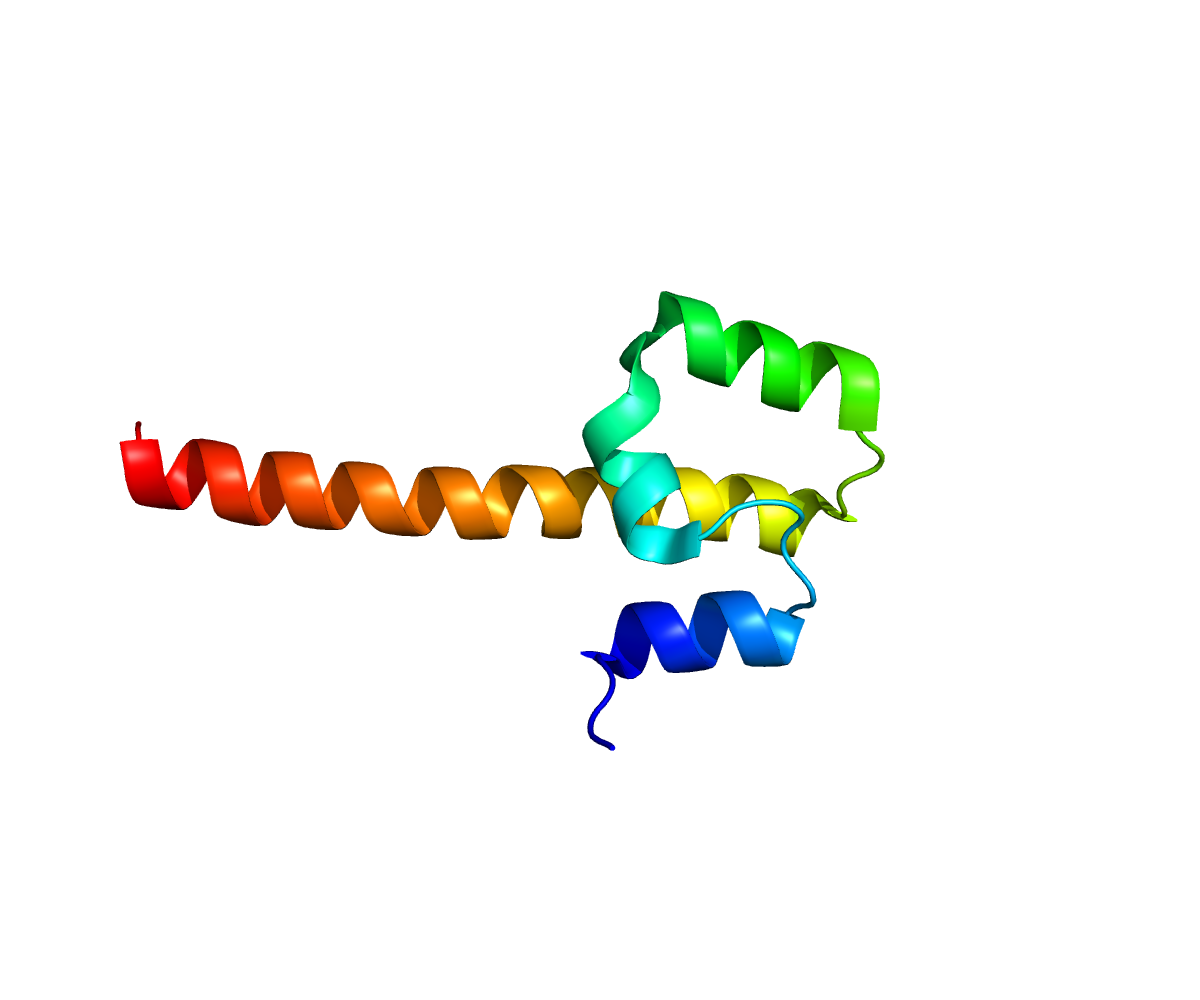

Identifiers
- Aliases: NFE2, NF-E2, p45, nuclear factor, erythroid 2
- External IDs: OMIM: 601490; MGI: 97308; GeneCards: NFE2
Available structures
PDB	Ortholog search: PDBe RCSB
PDB	List of PDB id codes 2KZ5

Gene location (Human)
Chr.	Chromosome 12 (human)
Band	12q13.13	Start	54,292,111 bp
Band	12q13.13	End	54,301,015 bp

Gene location (Mouse)
Chr.	Chromosome 15 (mouse)
Band	15 F3|15 58.62 cM	Start	103,156,639 bp
Band	15 F3|15 58.62 cM	End	103,166,830 bp
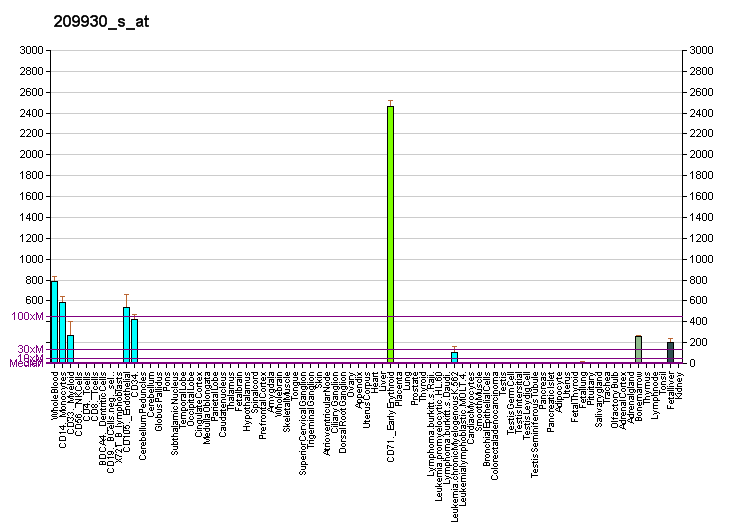
RNA expression pattern
Bgee	Human / Mouse (ortholog); Top expressed in: blood; monocyte; granulocyte; trabecular bone; bone marrow; bone marrow cell; spleen; testicle; right lung; upper lobe of left lung / Top expressed in: granulocyte; fetal liver hematopoietic progenitor cell; tibiofemoral joint; blood; spleen; human fetus; yolk sac; embryo; bone marrow; body of femur; More reference expression data
BioGPS	More reference expression data
Gene ontology
Molecular function	protein N-terminus binding; transcription coactivator activity; transcription cis-regulatory region binding; protein binding; WW domain binding; DNA-binding transcription factor activity; sequence-specific DNA binding; DNA binding; cis-regulatory region sequence-specific DNA binding; DNA-binding transcription factor activity, RNA polymerase II-specific
Cellular component	cytoplasm; PML body; nucleus; nucleoplasm; protein-DNA complex
Biological process	hemostasis; regulation of transcription, DNA-templated; blood coagulation; blood circulation; transcription, DNA-templated; multicellular organism development; positive regulation of transcription, DNA-templated; nucleosome disassembly; regulation of transcription by RNA polymerase II; regulation of megakaryocyte differentiation
Sources:Amigo / QuickGO
Orthologs
Databases	NCBI: entry; OMA: entry
Species	Human	Mouse
Entrez	4778	18022
Ensembl	ENSG00000123405	ENSMUSG00000058794
UniProt	Q16621	Q07279
RefSeq (mRNA)	NM_001136023; NM_001261461; NM_006163; NM_001400365; NM_001400372 NM_001400373	NM_008685; NM_001302338; NM_001302339; NM_001302340; NM_001302341 NM_001302343; NM_001400376
RefSeq (protein)	NP_001129495; NP_001248390; NP_006154	NP_001289267; NP_001289268; NP_001289269; NP_001289270; NP_001289272 NP_032711; NP_001387305
Location (UCSC)	Chr 12: 54.29 – 54.3 Mb	Chr 15: 103.16 – 103.17 Mb
PubMed search
- Wikidata
View/Edit Human	View/Edit Mouse

Transcription factor NF-E2 45 kDa subunit is a protein that in humans is encoded by the NFE2 gene.

It is involved in megakaryocyte production.

== Interactions ==
NFE2 has been shown to interact with CREB-binding protein.
