= Alcino J. Silva =

American neuroscientist (born 1961)

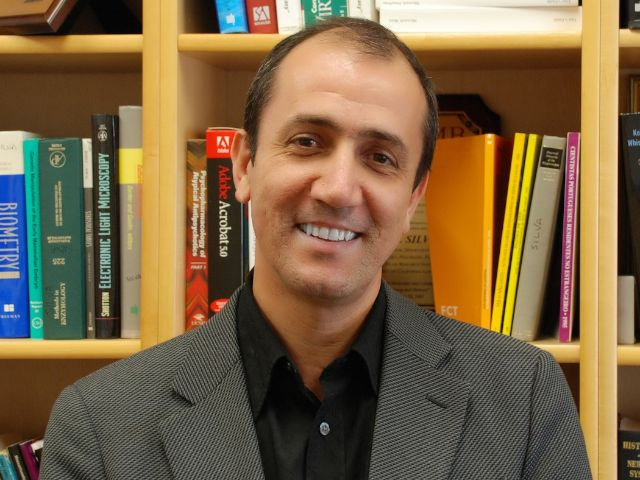
- Silva in 2008
- Born: Alcino Jose Silva; April 9, 1961 (age 65); Marco de Canaveses Municipality, Portugal
- Education: Rutgers University; University of Utah; Massachusetts Institute of Technology
- Known for: Molecular cellular cognition of memory
- Spouse(s): Tawnie Silva (2 children: Elenna Silva and Alexander Silva)
- Awards: Medalha Marco Canavezes, Senior Roche Award for Translational Neuroscience, Order of Prince Henry, American Association for the Advancement of Science, UCLA Distinguished Professor
- Scientific career
- Fields: Neuroscience, psychiatry, psychology
- Workplaces: UCLA
- Doctoral advisor: Raymond White; Susumu Tonegawa (post doctoral)

Alcino J. Silva (born April 9, 1961) is a Portuguese-American neuroscientist who was the recipient of the 2008 Order of Prince Henry and elected as a fellow of the American Association for the Advancement of Science in 2013 for his contributions to the molecular cellular cognition of memory, a field he pioneered with the publication of two articles in Science in 1992.

Silva is now retired but he was a Distinguished Professor of neurobiology, psychiatry and psychology at the David Geffen School of Medicine at UCLA, director of the Integrated Center for Learning and Memory at UCLA, and the Founding President of the Molecular and Cellular Cognition Society.

He is former scientific director of the Division of Intramural Research Programs at the National Institute of Mental Health, having also served as member of the Board of Regents of the University of Minho, Portugal.

== Early years ==
Silva was born in Portugal in 1961, but spent his early years in Luanda, Angola. He left Africa when he was 12 and in Portugal he went through the Carnation Revolution of 1974. He arrived in the United States in 1978, attended Rutgers University, where he studied biology and philosophy and worked in the Drosophila laboratory of William Sofer. After that he pursued graduate studies in human genetics at the University of Utah. There, he worked with Raymond White, one of the pioneers of modern human genetics.

His graduate work showed that epigenetic patterns of DNA methylation can be polymorphic and that they are inherited in a Mendelian fashion. During his graduate studies he became intrigued by the inner processes of science, and organized yearly graduate symposia where leading scientists shared their insights on this subject. It was in Utah that he realized that he could combine his passion for biology with his interest in epistemology. It was also in Utah, while working with Mario Capecchi, that he had the idea of bringing the newly developed mouse gene targeting approaches to studies of memory. Capecchi shared the Nobel prize with Martin Evans and Oliver Smithies for the development of gene targeting strategies in mice.

== Post-doctoral work and early research at MIT ==
While at a meeting in Cold Spring Harbor Laboratory, Silva heard from Peter Mombaerts (now at the Max Planck Institute for Biophysics) that Susumu Tonegawa at MIT was interested in Neuroscience (Tonegawa had taken a Neuroscience course at CSHL in 1987), and that his lab was trying to set up gene targeting to study the immunology T-cell receptors they had cloned. So, he wrote to Tonegawa and proposed to target genes expressed postnatally in the cerebellum to study cerebellar memory. At the time the Tonegawa laboratory at MIT was focused exclusively in immunology. Susumu Tomegawa was awarded a Nobel Prize in 1987 for his discovery of the genetic mechanism that produces antibody diversity. Silva joined the Tonegawa laboratory in early fall of 1988.

After attending a Society for Neuroscience symposium (Toronto, 1988), organized by John Lisman on mechanisms of hippocampal plasticity, Silva decided to study hippocampal-dependent memory formation. The compelling properties of calcium calmodulin kinase II, one of the topics discussed in that symposium, and a model by John Lisman proposing a key role for that kinase in hippocampal learning and memory, persuaded Silva to refocus his project in the Tonegawa laboratory on the role of the alpha calcium calmodulin kinase II in hippocampal synaptic plasticity and learning & memory. The two articles he published in Science as a post-doctoral fellow in Susumu Tonegawa's laboratory were the first to combine molecular genetic techniques with electrophysiological analyses and behavioral studies. This interdisciplinary integration of molecular, electrophysiological and behavioral approaches, fostered by transgenic techniques, has become a mainstay of neuroscience studies.

== The Cold Spring Harbor Laboratory years ==
After spending three years in the Tonegawa laboratory, Silva set up his own laboratory at Cold Spring Harbor Laboratory in Long Island, New York, a research institute then run by James Watson, best known as the co-discoverer of the structure of DNA in 1953 with Francis Crick. Initially, the Silva laboratory focused its studies on molecular and cellular mechanisms of hippocampal learning and memory. For example, Rousudan Bourtchuladze led a project in the Silva laboratory that uncovered a role for the transcription factor CREB in the stability of hippocampal long term potentiation and long-term memory. This was the first report of a genetic manipulation that affected the stability of synaptic plasticity and specifically long-. but not short-term memory. Other notable studies of memory mechanisms in the early years of the Silva laboratory in Cold Spring Harbor included the discovery that hippocampal pre-synaptic short-term plasticity mechanisms have a role in hippocampal learning and memory. This early work with hippocampal mutations that affected long term potentiation and learning & memory became the basis for a large literature that now has definitively implicated stable changes in synaptic plasticity in the hippocampal CA1 region in hippocampal dependent learning and memory.

== Move to UCLA ==
In 1998, the Silva laboratory moved to the Department of Neurobiology at the UCLA School of Medicine. There, the laboratory bridged their growing involvement in animal models of cognitive disorders with clinical studies. Additionally, UCLA's large and highly collaborative neuroscience community was an ideal environment for the interdisciplinary studies that characterized work in the Silva laboratory. The Silva laboratory became more involved in studying molecular and cellular mechanisms responsible for cognitive deficits in genetic neurodevelopmental disorders. In the late nineties, cognitive deficits associated with this class of disorders were thought to be caused by genetic disruptions of brain development Animal model studies of Neurofibromatosis type I (NF1) in the Silva lab suggested that the learning and memory deficits associated with NF1 mutations are caused by changes in synaptic plasticity mechanisms in adults. Accordingly, a project led by Rui M. Costa in the Silva Lab demonstrated that the electrophysiological, and more importantly the behavioral deficits, caused by NF1 mutations could be reversed in adults by manipulations that corrected the molecular signaling deficits associated with these mutations. This discovery, and a series of later studies in many laboratories worldwide, have demonstrated the surprising efficacy of adult interventions in reversing cognitive phenotypes in animal models of neurodevelopmental disorders. Following the NF1 studies published in 2002 by the Silva laboratory, other findings that reported adult rescue of neurodevelopment disorders include, for example, animal studies of Lhermitte-Duclos disease and Rubinstein-Taybi syndrome in 2003, Fragile X syndrome in 2005, Down syndrome in 2007, Rett syndrome and Angelman syndrome in 2007, and Tuberous Sclerosis in 2008.

== Development of treatments for cognitive deficits in neurofibromatosis type I and tuberous sclerosis ==
Weidong Li and Steven Kushner led a team in the Silva lab that developed a treatment for the cognitive deficits associated with an animal model of Neurofibromatosis type I (NF1). They discovered that Lovastatin, a statin that crosses the blood–brain barrier, at a dose that does not affect control mice, rescues the Ras/MAPK signaling, synaptic plasticity and behavioral deficits of mice with a NF1 mutation. Statins decrease the levels of isoprenyls, lipid groups that are required for the isoprenylation and activity of Ras, a signaling molecule normally regulated by the protein encoded by the NF1 gene. The work in the Silva lab showed that the NF1 mutation leads to increases in the levels of active Ras in the brain, and that statins reverse this increase without affecting Ras signaling in controls. These results have led to a number of small promising, but inconclusive, clinical trials, and to two large ongoing clinical studies in the US and Europe. A team led by Dan Ehninger in the Silva lab also showed that rapamycin, an FDA approved inhibitor of mTOR, can reverse the late-LTP deficits and learning impairments they discovered in an animal model of Tuberous Sclerosis (Tsc2 heterozygous mice). TSC is highly associated with autism, but the Tsc2 heterozygous mice did not show any autism-like behavioral abnormalities, such as social interaction deficits. Artificially activating the immune system of pregnant mice, however, does reveal social interaction deficits in Tsc2 heterozygous progeny, suggesting that the autism-like symptoms in TSC require not only Tsc mutations, but also another factor, such as immune activation during pregnancy. Importantly, analyses of human TSC data suggested a similar interaction between the TSC mutation and immuno-activation during pregnancy. Recently, Miou Zhou and colleagues at the Silva lab found that rapamycin is also capable of both preventing and reversing behavioral deficits caused by mutation of a schizophrenia-causing gene (DISC 1) in neurons that are born and develop in adult mice (i.e., adult neurogenesis). Surprisingly, rapamycin reverses behavioral deficits despite its inability to reverse structural deficits discovered in neurons with Disc 1 knock down. All together, these findings make a compelling case that adult treatments may be effective at reversing behavioral cognitive and psychiatric symptoms associated with neurodevelopmental disorders such as NF1, TSC and schizophrenia.

== Mechanisms of remote memory ==
Until recently, research on molecular, cellular and system mechanisms of memory focused almost exclusively on the early stages (minutes, hours following training) of memory formation. Paul Frankland and colleagues in the Silva laboratory explored the molecular and cellular underpinnings of remote memory consolidation. They discovered one of the first molecular manipulations that disrupts specifically remote memory. Strikingly, the remote memory mutation they described disrupts synaptic plasticity in neocortex, but not in the hippocampus, a result consistent with models proposing that the hippocampus can only support memory for a short time, and that remote memory depends on neocortical storage sites. Frankland and colleagues in the Silva lab also used a combination of genetic, imaging and reversible lesion approaches to search for regions in the neocortex that are involved in remote memory. These studies indicated that unlike the hippocampus, prefrontal cortical regions, such as the anterior cingulate, have a critical role in remote, but not in recent memory retrieval. Altogether, these studies opened the door to unraveling the molecular and cellular mechanisms that are responsible for the long-term storage of information in the brain. Once again, studies in the Silva Laboratory revealed the critical role of synaptic plasticity in learning and memory, this time in cortical memory storage

== Discovery of neuronal memory allocation ==
A team led by Sheena Josselyn in the Silva Lab discovered that there are molecular and cellular mechanisms that regulate which neurons in a circuit encode a given memory (neuronal memory allocation). They found that the transcription factor CREB modulates the probability that individual amygdala neurons become involved in storing a specific emotional memory: higher levels of CREB increase this probability while lower levels of CREB have the opposite effect. Later, Yu Zhou and colleagues in the Silva lab discovered that CREB modulates memory allocation by regulating neuronal excitability. These studies suggested that the mechanisms that consolidate one memory, for a limited period of time, may be involved in determining the allocation of the next memory, so that the two memories are associated or linked.

== Mechanisms that link memories across time ==
In 2016, Denise Cai, a postdoctoral fellow in Silva's laboratory, led a team of scientists at UCLA and UCSD that discovered that mechanisms of memory allocation can be used to link memories across time. They showed that one memory triggers the activation of CREB and subsequent enhancements in excitability in a subset of neurons of a neuronetwork, so that a subsequent memory, even many hours later, can be directed or allocated to some of the same neurons that encoded the first memory. Later on, recall of the first memory triggers the activation of those neurons and therefore the reactivation and retrieval of the second memory. These results represent the first molecular, cellular and circuit mechanism underlying the linking of memories across time. These authors also showed that memory linking mechanisms are affected in the aging brain, and that manipulating excitability in a subset of neurons reverses these deficits. Impairments in CREB and neuronal excitability in aging likely underlie these abnormalities in memory linking. It is possible that problems with memory linking may underlie well-known source memory problems (source amnesia) associated with aging. In July 2018, Scientific American highlighted the Silva laboratory's discovery of Memory Allocation and Linking as one of "13 Discoveries that Could Change Everything."

In 2022 Yang Shen, Miou Zhou and colleagues in the Silva lab discovered that the delayed expression of the receptor CCR5 closes the window of time in which two memories can be linked. CCR5 activation results in a decrease in neuronal excitability, and this leads to a loss in the overlap between the memory ensembles in the hippocampus (CA1) that encode both memories, and consequently to a loss of memory linking. Without this memory ensemble overlap, the recall of one memory no longer triggers the recall of the other. Remarkably, these authors also found that increases in CCR5 underlie the age-related decline in memory linking that the Silva lab had discovered in 2016. Indeed, Maraviroc, an FDA approved CCR5 inhibitor, as well as a CCR5 genetic mutation, can reverse this age-related decline in memory linking. These results suggest the exciting possibility that drugs like Maraviroc may be useful for treating age-related decline in forms of memory that are related to memory linking, including source and relational memory. This discovery was extensively covered by the science and public press, including by a News and Views article in the Journal Nature.

== ResearchMaps for integrating and planning research ==
The growth of the scientific literature in the last 20 years has been unprecedented. For example, the library of medicine now includes more than two million Neuroscience articles. Anthony Landreth and Alcino Silva have developed a strategy to derive maps (simplified abstraction) of published articles in Neuroscience that they think could be used to integrate and summarize with more clarity and objectivity what we know, what we are uncertain about and what we do not know in neuroscience. They propose that these maps of research findings would also be invaluable during experiment planning: Understanding more objectively the implications of the millions of neuroscience papers already published would allow neuroscientists to more clearly define what to do next. Landreth and Silva propose that quantitative maps of research findings will be to experiment planning in neuroscience what statistics is to experiment analyses: a tool that will help neuroscientists judge the likelihood that a series of planned experiments will contribute to the research record. As a first step towards the generation of these maps, Landreth and Silva developed a way to classify the millions of experiments in neuroscience into a small number of categories that are critical for the generation of these maps. To generate these maps, Landreth and Silva also developed a set of algorithms that formalize strategies neuroscientists use to determine the strength of evidence in their fields. These algorithms are used to represent the experiments in networks of causally connected phenomena (i.e., research maps). Pranay Doshi and colleagues in the Silva Lab developed a free app that helps researchers generate these maps. Data from individual research articles is entered into a relational database, and the app can generate maps not only for experimental findings in single research articles, but also for combinations of findings associated with different articles. The user can query the app and make specific maps that can then be used for experiment planning.

== Awards ==
- Klingenstein Foundation, 1993
- Beckman Young Investigators Award, Beckman Foundation, 1994
- Whitehall Foundation, 1994
- Japan Society for the Promotion of Science, 1994.
- Merck Foundation, 1995
- McKnight Foundation, 1995
- National Institutes of Health-R01, 1995
- National Institutes of Health-P01, 1996
- VW Foundation, 1996
- Neurofibromatosis Consortium, 1996
- Neurofibromatosis Foundation, 1996
- Perkin Fund, 1997
- Neurofibromatosis Foundation, 1997
- National Institutes of Health-RO1, 1998
- Neurofibromatosis Inc, 1999
- Fragile X Foundation Award, 1999
- National Institutes of Health-SNRP, 1999
- National Institutes of Health-RO1, 1999
- NARSAD, 1999
- National Institutes of Health-RO1, 1999
- Neurofibromatosis Inc, 2000
- Neurofibromatosis Inc, 2001
- National Institutes of Health, National Institute on Aging RO1, 2001
- National Institutes of Health, National Institute of Neurological Disorders and Stroke RO1, 2002
- NF-Congressionally Directed Medical Research Programs, 2002
- Neurofibromatosis Inc, 2002
- Tenenbaum Creativity Chair, 2004
- NF-Congressionally Directed Medical Research Programs, 2005
- NF INC 2006
- National Institutes of Health, National Institute on Aging Merit Award 2006
- National Institutes of Health, National Institute of Mental Health Conte Center 2006 (Director)
- Tenenbaum Creativity Award, 2007
- Adelson Foundation, 2007, 2008
- Order of Prince Henry, 2008
- Senior Roche Award For Translational Neuroscience, 2009
- Medal of Science, Marco Canavezes, Portugal, 2009
- National Institute of Mental Health RO1 2010
- Richard Merkin Foundation, 2011
- Leslie Chair in Pioneering Brain Research, 2011
- Adelson Foundation Award, 2012
- Fellow, American Association for the Advancement of Science, 2012
- Best Leader Award in Applied Science and Technology, 2014
- UCLA Distinguished Professor, 2015
- National Institutes of Health-National Institute of Mental Health RO1, 2015
- National Institutes of Health-National Institute of Mental Health RO1, 2017
- National Institutes of Health-National Institute on Aging RO1, 2017
- Causality UCLA seed award 2017

== Selected publications ==
- Silva, A.J.; White, R. (1988). "Inheritance of allelic blueprints for methylation patterns". Cell. 54 (2): 145–52. doi:10.1016/0092-8674(88)90546-6. PMID 2898978. S2CID 2115543.
- Silva, A.J.; Paylor, R.; Wehner, J.M.; Tonegawa, S. (1992). "Impaired spatial learning in alpha-calcium-calmodulin kinase II mutant mice". Science. 257 (5067): 206–11. Bibcode:1992Sci...257..206S. doi:10.1126/science.1321493. PMID 1321493.
- Silva, A.J.; Stevens, C.F.; Tonegawa, S.; Wang, Y. (1992). "Deficient hippocampal long-term potentiation in alpha-calcium-calmodulin kinase II mutant mice". Science. 257 (5067): 201–6. Bibcode:1992Sci...257..201S. doi:10.1126/science.1378648. PMID 1378648.
- Bourtchuladze, R.; Frenguelli, B.; Blendy, J.; Cioffi, D.; Schutz, G.; Silva, A.J. (1994). "Deficient long-term memory in mice with a targeted mutation of the cAMP-responsive element-binding protein". Cell. 79 (1): 59–68. doi:10.1016/0092-8674(94)90400-6. PMID 7923378. S2CID 17250247.
- Silva, A.J.; Rosahl, T.W.; Chapman, P.F.; Marowitz, Z.; Friedman, E.; Frankland, P.W.; Cestari, V.; Cioffi, D.; Sudhof, T.C.; Bourtchuladze, R. (1996). "Impaired learning in mice with abnormal short-lived plasticity". Curr Biol. 6 (11): 1509–18. doi:10.1016/s0960-9822(96)00756-7. PMID 8939606.
- Silva, A.J.; Frankland, P.W.; Marowitz, Z.; Friedman, E.; Laszlo, G.S.; Cioffi, D.; Jacks, T.; Bourtchuladze, R. (1997). "A mouse model for the learning and memory deficits associated with neurofibromatosis type I.". Nat Genet. 15 (3): 281–4. doi:10.1038/ng0397-281. PMID 9054942. S2CID 33275971.
- Giese, K.P.; Fedorov, N.B.; Filipkowski, R.K.; Silva, A.J. (1998). "Autophosphorylation at Thr286 of the alpha calcium-calmodulin kinase II in LTP and learning". Science. 279 (5352): 870–3. Bibcode:1998Sci...279..870G. doi:10.1126/science.279.5352.870. PMID 9452388.
- Frankland, P.W.; O'Brien, C.; Ohno, M.; Kirkwood, A.; Silva, A.J. (2001). "Alpha-CaMKII-dependent plasticity in the cortex is required for permanent memory". Nature. 411 (6835): 309–13. Bibcode:2001Natur.411..309F. doi:10.1038/35077089. PMID 11357133. S2CID 4384100.
- Ohno, M.; Frankland, P.W.; Chen, A.P.; Costa, R.M.; Silva, A.J. (2001). "Inducible, pharmacogenetic approaches to the study of learning and memory". Nat Neurosci. 4 (12): 1238–43. doi:10.1038/nn771. PMID 11713472. S2CID 1032735.
- Costa, R.M.; Federov, N.B.; Kogan, J.H.; Murphy, G.G.; Stern, J.; Ohno, M.; Kucherlapati, R.; Jacks, T.; Silva, A.J. (2002). "Mechanism for the learning deficits in a mouse model of neurofibromatosis type 1". Nature. 415 (6871): 526–30. doi:10.1038/nature711. PMID 11793011. S2CID 4342613.
- Kida, S.; Josselyn, S.A.; Kogan, J.H.; Chevere, I.; Masushige, S.; Silva, A.J. (2002). "CREB required for the stability of new and reactivated fear memories". Nat Neurosci. 5 (4): 348–55. doi:10.1038/nn819. PMID 11889468. S2CID 9255921.
- Frankland, PW; Bontempi, B; Talton, LE; Kaczmarek, L; Silva, AJ (May 2004). "The involvement of the anterior cingulate cortex in remote contextual fear memory". Science. 304 (5672): 881–3. Bibcode:2004Sci...304..881F. doi:10.1126/science.1094804. PMID 15131309. S2CID 15893863..
- Frankland, P.W.; Josselyn, S.A.; Anagnostaras, S.G.; Kogan, J.H.; Takahashi, E.; Silva, A.J. (2004). "Consolidation of CS and US representations in associative fear conditioning". Hippocampus. 14 (5): 557–69. doi:10.1002/hipo.10208. PMID 15301434. S2CID 18210214.
- Murphy, G.G.; Fedorov, N.B.; Giese, K.P.; Ohno, M.; Friedman, E.; Chen, R.; Silva, A.J. (2004). "Increased neuronal excitability, synaptic plasticity, and learning in aged Kvbeta1.1 knockout mice". Curr Biol. 14 (21): 1907–15. doi:10.1016/j.cub.2004.10.021. PMID 15530391.
- Kushner, S.A.; Elgersma, Y.; Murphy, G.G.; Jaarsma, D.; Hojjati, M.R.; Cui, Y.; LeBoutillier, J.C.; Marrone, D.F.; Choi, E.S.; Zeeuw, C.I. De; Petit, T.L.; Pozzo-Miller, L.; Silva, A.J. (2005). "Modulation of presynaptic plasticity and learning by the H-ras/extracellular signal-regulated kinase/synapsin I signaling pathway". J Neurosci. 25 (42): 9721–34. doi:10.1523/jneurosci.2836-05.2005. PMC 2802213. PMID 16237176.
- Li, W.; Cui, Y.; Kushner, S.A.; Brown, R.A.; Jentsch, J.D.; Frankland, P.W.; Cannon, T.D.; Silva, A.J. (2005). "The HMG-CoA reductase inhibitor lovastatin reverses the learning and attention deficits in a mouse model of neurofibromatosis type 1". Curr Biol. 15 (21): 1961–7. doi:10.1016/j.cub.2005.09.043. PMID 16271875.
- Han, J.H.; Kushner, S.A.; Yiu, A.P.; Cole, C.J.; Matynia, A.; Brown, R.A.; Neve, R.L.; Guzowski, J.F.; Silva, A.J.; Josselyn, S.A. (2007). "Neuronal competition and selection during memory formation". Science. 316 (5823): 457–60. Bibcode:2007Sci...316..457H. doi:10.1126/science.1139438. PMID 17446403. S2CID 8460538.
- Ehninger, D.; Han, S.; Shilyansky, C.; Zhou, Y.; Li, W.; Kwiatkowski, D.J.; Ramesh, V.; Silva, A.J. (2008). "Reversal of learning deficits in a Tsc2(+/-) mouse model of tuberous sclerosis". Nat Med. 14 (8): 843–848. doi:10.1038/nm1788. PMC 2664098. PMID 18568033.
- Cui, Y; Costa, RM; Murphy, GG; Elgersma, Y; Zhu, Y; Gutmann, DH; Parada, LF; Mody, I; Silva, AJ (2008). "Neurofibromin regulation of ERK signaling modulates GABA release and learning". Cell. 135 (3): 549–560. doi:10.1016/j.cell.2008.09.060. PMC 2673196. PMID 18984165.
- Lee, Y-S; Silva, AJ (Feb 2009). "The molecular and cellular biology of enhanced cognition". Nat Rev Neurosci. 10 (2): 126–40. doi:10.1038/nrn2572. PMC 2664745. PMID 19153576.
- Zhou, Y; Won, J.; Karlsson, M.G. Zhou; Rogerson, T; Balaji, J.; Neve, R.; Poirazi, P.; Silva, A.J. (2009). "CREB regulates excitability and the allocation of memory to subsets of neurons in the amygdala". Nature Neuroscience. 12 (11): 1438–43. doi:10.1038/nn.2405. PMC 2783698. PMID 19783993.
- Silva, A.J.; Zhou, Y; Rogerson, T; Shobe, J; Balaji, J. (2009). "Molecular and Cellular Approaches to Memory Allocation in Neural Circuits". Science. 326 (5951): 391–5. doi:10.1126/science.1174519. PMC 2844777. PMID 19833959.
- Shilyansky, C; Karlsgodt, KH; Cummings, DM; Sidiropoulou, K; Hardt, M; James, AS; Ehninger, D; Bearden, CE; Poirazi, P; Jentsch, JD; Cannon, TD; Levine, MS; Silva, AJ (Jul 2010). "Neurofibromin regulates corticostriatal inhibitory networks during working memory performance". Proc Natl Acad Sci U S A. 107 (29): 13141–6. Bibcode:2010PNAS..10713141S. doi:10.1073/pnas.1004829107. PMC 2919968. PMID 20624961.
- Zhou, M; Li, W; Huang, S; Song, J; Kim, J Tian; Kang, E Sano; Liu, C; Balaji, J; Wu, S; Zhou, Y; Zhou, Y; Parivash, S; Ehninger, D; He, L. Song; Ming, G; Silva, AJ (2013). "mTOR Inhibition Ameliorates Cognitive and Affective Deficits Caused by Disc1 Knockdown Specifically in Adult-Born Dentate Granule Neurons (2013)". Neuron. 77 (4): 647–654. doi:10.1016/j.neuron.2012.12.033. PMC 3586374. PMID 23439118.
- Landreth, A; Silva, AJ (Aug 2013). "The need for research maps to navigate published work and inform experiment planning". Neuron. 79 (3): 411–5. doi:10.1016/j.neuron.2013.07.024. PMID 23931992.
- Cai, DJ; Aharoni, D; Shuman, T; Shobe, J; Biane, J; Song, W; Wei, B; Veshkini, M; La-Vu, M; Lou, J; Flores, S; Kim, I; Sano, Y; Zhou, M; Baumgaertel, K; Lavi, A; Kamata, M; Tuszynski, M; Mayford, M; Golshani, P; Silva, AJ (May 2016). "A shared neural ensemble links distinct contextual memories encoded close in time". Nature. 534 (7605): 115–8. Bibcode:2016Natur.534..115C. doi:10.1038/nature17955. PMC 5063500. PMID 27251287.
- Silva, A.J. (2017). "Memory's Intricate Web". Sci Am. 317 (1): 30–37. Bibcode:2017SciAm.317a..30S. doi:10.1038/scientificamerican0717-30. PMC 5915626. PMID 28632232.
