= NRL (disambiguation) =

NRL most commonly refers to the National Rugby League, the top professional league of Oceanian rugby league football clubs.

NRL may also refer to:

== Sports leagues ==
- NRL Racing Development Cycling Team, a California bike racing team
- National Ringette League, a Canadian ringette league
- National Rookie League, an American basketball minor league, 2000–2002
- National Rugby League, the top professional rugby league of Oceanian rugby league football clubs
- Newcastle Rugby League, an Australian rugby league competition

== Science and technology ==
- NRL (gene), a human gene that encodes the neural retina-specific leucine zipper protein
- Namespace Routing Language, a mapping from namespace URIs to schema URIs
- Natural rubber latex, in medicine
- Nucleosome Repeat Length, the average distance between the centers of neighboring nucleosomes
- United States Naval Research Laboratory, a corporate research laboratory in Washington, D.C.

== Other uses ==
- National Rafidain List, used by the Assyrian Democratic Movement during the Iraqi elections
- North Ronaldsay Airport, Orkney Islands, United Kingdom (IATA code)
- Nouvelle route du Littoral, road in French island of Réunion, Indian Ocean

== See also ==
- NRL Rugby League (series), a 2003 video game franchise
