= Cellular memory =

Cellular memory can refer to:

== Biology ==
- Body memory, the hypothesis that (traumatic) memories can be stored in individual cells outside the brain
- Neuronal memory allocation, the storage of memories in the brain at the cellular level
- The epigenetic state of a cell, including the nongenetic information that can be passed from parents to offspring
  - Genomic imprinting
- Other forms of cellular memory such as immunological memory

== Technology ==
- A memory card used in cellphones

== See also ==
- Genetic memory (disambiguation)
