= Genetic =

Genetic may refer to:

- Genetics, in biology, the science of genes, heredity, and the variation of organisms
  - Genetic, used as an adjective, refers to genes
    - Genetic disorder, any disorder caused by a genetic mutation, whether inherited or de novo
    - Genetic mutation, a change in a gene
      - Heredity, genes and their mutations being passed from parents to offspring
  - Genetic recombination, refers to the recombining of alleles resulting in a new molecule of DNA
- Genetic relationship (linguistics), in linguistics, a relationship between two languages with a common ancestor language
- Genetic algorithm, in computer science, a kind of search technique modeled on evolutionary biology
- Genetic fallacy, a type of fallacy dealing with an arguments' source or origin rather than its content.

== See also ==
- Genetic memory (disambiguation)
