= ATF6B =

Protein-coding gene in the species Homo sapiens

Identifiers
- Aliases: ATF6B, CREB-RP, CREBL1, G13, activating transcription factor 6 beta
- External IDs: OMIM: 600984; MGI: 105121; GeneCards: ATF6B

Gene location (Human)
Chr.	Chromosome 6 (human)
Band	6p21.32	Start	32,115,264 bp
Band	6p21.32	End	32,128,253 bp

Gene location (Mouse)
Chr.	Chromosome 17 (mouse)
Band	17 B1|17 18.22 cM	Start	34,866,120 bp
Band	17 B1|17 18.22 cM	End	34,874,048 bp
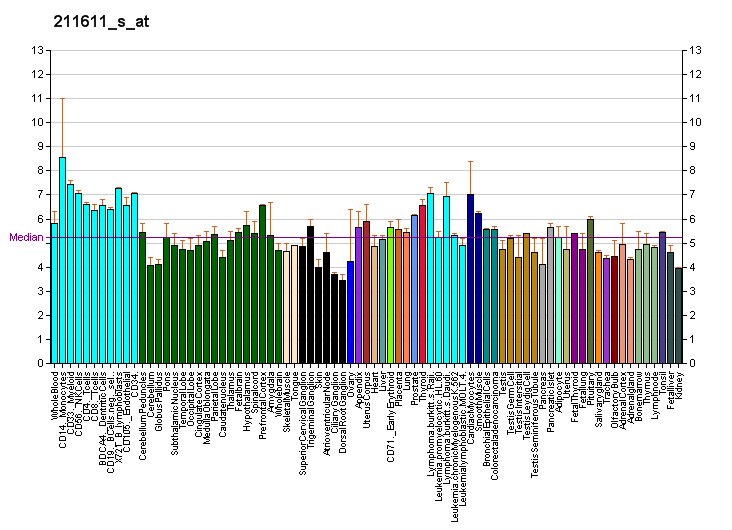

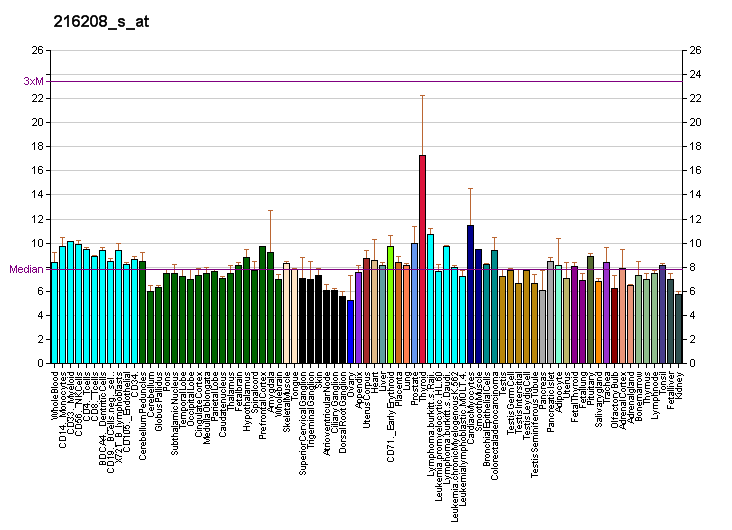

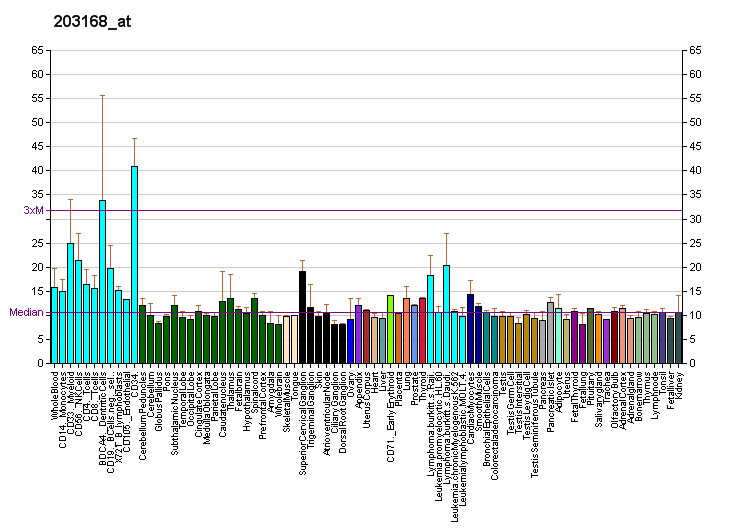
RNA expression pattern
Bgee	Human / Mouse (ortholog); Top expressed in: monocyte; granulocyte; right uterine tube; left ovary; right ovary; right lobe of thyroid gland; spleen; right hemisphere of cerebellum; left lobe of thyroid gland; gallbladder / Top expressed in: yolk sac; granulocyte; lip; dentate gyrus of hippocampal formation granule cell; neural layer of retina; neural tube; ventricular zone; thymus; choroid plexus of fourth ventricle; entorhinal cortex; More reference expression data
BioGPS	More reference expression data
Gene ontology
Molecular function	DNA binding; DNA-binding transcription factor activity; protein binding; cAMP response element binding; RNA polymerase II cis-regulatory region sequence-specific DNA binding; DNA-binding transcription activator activity, RNA polymerase II-specific; DNA-binding transcription factor activity, RNA polymerase II-specific
Cellular component	integral component of membrane; Golgi apparatus; endoplasmic reticulum membrane; membrane; intracellular anatomical structure; integral component of endoplasmic reticulum membrane; protein-DNA complex; endoplasmic reticulum; nucleus; endomembrane system; nucleolus; RNA polymerase II transcription regulator complex
Biological process	regulation of transcription, DNA-templated; positive regulation of transcription from RNA polymerase II promoter in response to endoplasmic reticulum stress; regulation of transcription by RNA polymerase II; transcription, DNA-templated; endoplasmic reticulum unfolded protein response; ATF6-mediated unfolded protein response; response to unfolded protein; signal transduction; transcription by RNA polymerase II; positive regulation of transcription by RNA polymerase II; negative regulation of ATF6-mediated unfolded protein response
Sources:Amigo / QuickGO
Orthologs
Databases	NCBI: entry; OMA: entry
Species	Human	Mouse
Entrez	1388	12915
Ensembl	ENSG00000213676; ENSG00000228628; ENSG00000234539; ENSG00000168468	ENSMUSG00000015461
UniProt	Q99941	O35451
RefSeq (mRNA)	NM_004381; NM_001136153	NM_017406
RefSeq (protein)	NP_001129625; NP_004372	n/a
Location (UCSC)	Chr 6: 32.12 – 32.13 Mb	Chr 17: 34.87 – 34.87 Mb
PubMed search
- Wikidata
View/Edit Human	View/Edit Mouse

Cyclic AMP-dependent transcription factor ATF-6 beta is a protein which in humans is encoded by the ATF6B gene (previously CREBL1).

== Function ==
The protein encoded by this gene bears sequence similarity with the Creb/ATF subfamily of the bZip superfamily of transcription factors. It localizes to both the cytoplasm and the nucleus. The gene localizes to the major histocompatibility complex (MHC) class III region on chromosome 6.
