= TLQP-62 =

Peptide in Homo sapiens

VGF nerve growth factor inducible

Identifiers
- Symbol: VGF
- NCBI gene: 7425
- HGNC: 12684
- OMIM: 602186
- RefSeq: NM_003378
- UniProt: O15240

Other data
- Locus: Chr. 7 q22
Search for
- Structures: Swiss-model
- Domains: InterPro

TLQP-62 (amino acid 556–617) is a VGF-derived C-terminal peptide that was first discovered by Trani et al. TLQP-62 is derived from VGF precursor protein via proteolytic cleavage by prohormone convertases PC1/3 at the RPR^{555} site. TLQP-62 is named after its first four N-terminal amino acids and its peptide length.

== Function ==
Although the receptor(s) for TLQP-62 has not been identified so far, extensive studies have demonstrated that it acts on central nervous system, peripheral nervous system and endocrine tissue to exert its biological functions.

=== Synaptic plasticity ===
Acute TLQP-62 treatment rapidly increases synaptic activity in hippocampal neurons, and potentiates CA1 field excitatory postsynaptic potential fEPSP in the hippocampal slices, thus facilitating hippocampal synaptic transmission. TLQP-62 also increases dendritic branching and length in cultured hippocampal neurons.

=== Neurogenesis ===
TLQP-62 treatment enhances hippocampal neurogenesis both in vitro and in vivo by promoting the proliferation in neuronal progenitor cells.

=== Antidepressant efficacy ===
Intrahippocampal TLQP-62 infusion produces both rapid and sustained antidepressant-like effects in the forced swim test. TLQP-62's processed peptide AQEE-30, when given via intracerebroventricular route, also elicits antidepressant-like effects.

=== Memory and learning ===
Acute intrahippocampal TLQP-62 infusion enhances memory formation via BDNF/TrkB signaling.

=== Pain ===
Acute intrathecal administration of TLQP-62 induces hypersensitivity to mechanical and cold stimuli that recapitulates neuropathic pain, potentially by regulating the excitability of dorsal horn neurons.

=== Insulin secretion ===
TLQP-62 treatment increases insulin secretion in cultured insulinoma cells by increasing intracellular calcium mobilization.
