= Sheena Josselyn =

Canadian neuroscientist

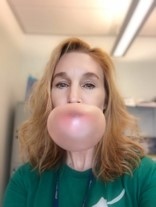
- Born: Cleveland, Ohio
- Education: Queens University, University of Toronto
- Known for: Engrams
- Spouse: Paul Frankland
- Awards: Daniel H. Efron Research Award from American College of Neuropsychopharmacology, Innovations in Psychopharmacology Award from Canadian College of Neuropsychopharmacology, Brenda Milner Lecturer (University of Lethbridge), Bryan Kolb Lecturer in Behavioural Neuroscience (University of Calgary), Canada Research Chair (CRC) in brain circuits and cognition Tier I
- Scientific career
- Fields: Neuroscience
- Workplaces: SickKids at the University of Toronto

Sheena Josselyn is a Canadian neuroscientist and a full professor of psychology and physiology at Hospital for Sick Children and The University of Toronto. Josselyn studies the neural basis of memory, specifically how the brain forms and stores memories in rodent models. She has made critical contributions to the field of Neuronal Memory Allocation and the study of engrams.

== Early life and education ==
Josselyn was born in Cleveland, Ohio but grew up in Kingston, Ontario, Canada. She identifies as Metis. Josselyn completed her undergraduate education at Queens University in Kingston, Ontario, Canada. Following her undergraduate degree, Josselyn completed a master's degree in clinical psychology under the mentorship of Dr. Rick Beninger. In her Masters, Josselyn published two first author papers, the first studying the modulatory effects of adenosine on dopamine in the striatum and the second on the interaction between neuropeptide Y and antipsychotics in the nucleus accumbens.

Josselyn then moved to Toronto to complete her PhD in psychology and neuroscience at the University of Toronto. Under the mentorship of Dr. Franco Vaccarino, Josselyn studied the effects of CCKB and CCKA modulation on associative learning and published multiple first author papers. Following her PhD, Josselyn completed her postdoctoral work at Yale University in New Haven under the mentorship of Dr. Mike Davis. Shortly after, she moved to LA to complete another postdoc under the mentorship of Dr. Alcino J. Silva at the University of California Los Angeles. Josselyn helped discover the importance of CREB in memory formation and retrieval which led to probing the molecular mechanisms and biological purpose of forgetting.

== Career and research ==
After finishing her postdoctoral work, Josselyn moved back to Toronto to start her lab at SickKids Hospital at the University of Toronto. Her overall goal is to understand how humans learn and remember such that one day her work can impact translational research at her institute and in her community. Some of Josselyn's early discoveries include discovering that CREB over-expression in the auditory thalamus increases memory and fear, and further, that ablating neurons that highly expressed CREB after fear learning actually ablates fear memories in rodent. These were some of the first findings isolating specific neurons representing a specific memory in the brain. Josselyn's multidisciplinary approach to tackling questions regarding memories led her to several prestigious awards and recognitions including becoming a member of the Royal Society of Canada in 2018 for her research.

== Awards ==
- 2023 Fellow of the American Association for the Advancement of Science
- 2018 Fellow of the Royal Society of Canada
- Daniel H. Efron Research Award from American College of Neuropsychopharmacology
- Innovations in Psychopharmacology Award from Canadian College of Neuropsychopharmacology
- Brenda Milner Lecturer (University of Lethbridge)
- Bryan Kolb Lecturer in Behavioural Neuroscience (University of Calgary)
- Canada Research Chair (CRC) in brain circuits and cognition Tier I

== Publications ==
- Josselyn, S.A., Köhler, S., Frankland, P.W. (2017). Heroes of the engram. Journal of Neuroscience, 37(18), 4647–4657. Heroes of the Engram
- Rashid, A.S., Yan, C., Mercaldo, V., ... Josselyn, S. (2016). Competition between engrams influences fear memory formation and recall. Science, 22(353), 383–87. Competition between engrams influences fear memory formation and recall
- Hsiang, H.L., Epp, J.R., van den Oever, M.,... Josselyn, S. (2014). Manipulating a “cocaine engram” in mice. Journal of Neuroscience 34(42), 14115–14127. DOI: Manipulating a “Cocaine Engram” in Mice
- Han, J.H., Kushner, S.A., Yiu, A.P.,... Josselyn, S. (2009). Selective erasure of a fear memory. Science, 323(5920), 1492–1496. DOI: Selective Erasure of a Fear Memory
- Han, J.H., Kushner, S.A., Yiu, A.P.,... Josselyn, S. (2007). Neuronal competition and selection during memory formation. Science, 316(5823), 457–60. DOI: Neuronal Competition and Selection During Memory Formation
