= VGF =

Mammalian protein found in Homo sapiens

Identifiers
- Aliases: VGF, SCG7, SgVII, VGF nerve growth factor inducible
- External IDs: OMIM: 602186; MGI: 1343180; GeneCards: VGF

Gene location (Human)
Chr.	Chromosome 7 (human)
Band	7q22.1	Start	101,162,509 bp
Band	7q22.1	End	101,165,569 bp

Gene location (Mouse)
Chr.	Chromosome 5 (mouse)
Band	5 G2|5 76.13 cM	Start	137,055,246 bp
Band	5 G2|5 76.13 cM	End	137,062,205 bp
RNA expression pattern
Bgee	Human / Mouse (ortholog); Top expressed in: superior frontal gyrus; hypothalamus; pituitary gland; islet of Langerhans; primary visual cortex; prefrontal cortex; nucleus accumbens; anterior pituitary; dorsolateral prefrontal cortex; Brodmann area 9 / Top expressed in: suprachiasmatic nucleus; dorsomedial hypothalamic nucleus; pontine nuclei; dorsal tegmental nucleus; median eminence; primary visual cortex; superior frontal gyrus; piriform cortex; olfactory tubercle; arcuate nucleus; More reference expression data
BioGPS	n/a
Gene ontology
Molecular function	neuropeptide hormone activity; growth factor activity; hormone activity; molecular function
Cellular component	extracellular region; transport vesicle; cytoplasmic vesicle; intracellular membrane-bounded organelle; extracellular space; endoplasmic reticulum lumen; Golgi apparatus
Biological process	ovarian follicle development; response to dietary excess; response to cold; response to insulin; response to cAMP; insulin secretion; defense response to bacterium; sexual reproduction; generation of precursor metabolites and energy; glucose homeostasis; carbohydrate homeostasis; regulation of synaptic plasticity; post-translational protein modification; regulation of signaling receptor activity; signal transduction
Sources:Amigo / QuickGO
Orthologs
Databases	NCBI: entry; OMA: entry
Species	Human	Mouse
Entrez	7425	381677
Ensembl	ENSG00000128564	ENSMUSG00000037428
UniProt	O15240	Q0VGU4
RefSeq (mRNA)	NM_003378	NM_001039385
RefSeq (protein)	NP_003369	NP_001034474
Location (UCSC)	Chr 7: 101.16 – 101.17 Mb	Chr 5: 137.06 – 137.06 Mb
PubMed search
- Wikidata
View/Edit Human	View/Edit Mouse

VGF or VGF nerve growth factor inducible is a secreted protein and neuropeptide precursor that may play a role in regulating energy homeostasis, metabolism and synaptic plasticity. The protein was first discovered in 1985 by Levi et al. in an experiment with PC12 cells and its name is non-acronymic. VGF gene encodes a precursor which is divided by proteolysis to polypeptides of different mass, which have a variety of functions, the best studied of which are the roles of TLQP-21 in the control of appetite and inflammation, and TLQP-62 as well as AQEE-30 in regulating depression-like behaviors and memory. The expression of VGF and VGF-derived peptides is detected in a subset of neurons in the central and peripheral nervous systems and specific populations of endocrine cells in the adenohypophysis, adrenal medulla, gastrointestinal tract, and pancreas. VGF expression is induced by NGF, CREB and BDNF and regulated by neurotrophin-3. Physical exercise significantly increases VGF expression in mice hippocampal tissue and upregulates a neurotrophic signaling cascade thought to underlie the action of antidepressants.

== Role in pathology ==
Changes in expression of discrete VGF fragments have been detected in different neurological and psychiatric conditions. In schizophrenia, one study has shown an increase in the VGF23-62 peptide and a subsequent small study demonstrated that drugs further increase the expression, pointing at a possible ameliorating action of the fragment. A decreased expression of VGF26-62 peptide was found in frontotemporal dementia and the expression of a fragment containing aminoacids 378-398 was found to be changing in amyotrophic lateral sclerosis and Alzheimer's disease. VGF expression has also been shown in damaged peripheral nerves, and it is thought to have a role in neuropathic pain. In glioblastoma, VGF has been shown to play autocrine and paracrine roles in feedback loops between differentiated glioblastoma cells and glioblastoma-specific cancer stem cells, promoting growth, survival and self-renewal.
