= Specialized Bicycle Components =

American bicycle company

Specialized Bicycle Components, Inc.
- Type: Private
- Industry: Bicycles
- Founded: 1974; 52 years ago
- Founder: Mike Sinyard
- Headquarters: Morgan Hill, California, US
- Key people: Armin Landgraf (CEO)
- Products: Mountain bikes; Road bikes; Gravel bikes; E-bikes; Bicycle components; Apparel
- Brands: Roval; S-Works
- Revenue: US$500 million (est.) (2011)
- Number of employees: c. 1,300 (2022)
- Website: specialized.com

Specialized Bicycle Components, Inc., colloquially known as and stylized as SPECIALIZED, is an American company that designs, manufactures and markets bicycles, bicycle components and related products under the brand name "Specialized", the premium and professional oriented "S-Works" badge, and high end components represented by the "Roval" name.

The Morgan Hill, California-based company was founded in 1974 by Mike Sinyard.

== History ==
The company was founded in 1974 by Mike Sinyard, a cycling enthusiast who sold his Volkswagen Bus for $1,500 to fund a cycle tour of Europe, where he bought handlebars and stems made by Cinelli to take back to the US. Sinyard started importing Italian bike components which were difficult to find in the United States, but the company began to produce its own bike parts by 1976, starting with the Specialized Touring Tire. In 1981, the company introduced its first two bikes: the Sequoia, a sport-touring design, and the Allez, a road bike. Specialized also introduced the first major production mountain bike in the world, the Stumpjumper, in 1981. Like the Sequoia and Allez, the Stumpjumper was designed by Tim Neenan and based on an early Tom Ritchey design. Specialized continues to produce bikes under the Stumpjumper name, including both hardtail and full-suspension models. The hardtail Stumpjumper was released in 1991 and discontinued after 2016, while the first full-suspension Stumpjumper was released in 1993 and is still in production today, with the Stumpjumper line-up now exclusively full-suspension. An original Stumpjumper is displayed in the Smithsonian Institution in Washington, D.C.

Mike Sinyard moved the firm to Morgan Hill, CA in 1984.

In 1988, Specialized introduced their Epic variants to aid the growth of carbon fiber bikes on a mass production scale. Epic models came with a lightweight carbon frame designed and engineered by Specialized, and often came stock with higher end components than non-Epic variants. Their first release was the Allez Epic, a carbon fiber variant of their Allez road bike. Their second release was the Stumpjumper Epic, a carbon fiber variant of their Stumpjumper mountain bike. The Stumpjumper Epic was the first ever production carbon fiber mountain bike. The Epic returned later in 2002, this time as a stand-alone XC model, debuting a game changing innovation with its Brain rear shock. The Brain utilized an inertia valve to help automatically open and close of the shock when needed, without rider input, opening for rough terrain and closing for smooth terrain, all while remaining unaffected from pedal strokes. In 2008, the newly designed Epic saw further development of the Brain technology and design with more rider adjustability improve rider experience and perception. It solidified its place in the XC community after Christoph Sauser won the 2008 UCI World Mountain Bike Championships by just under three minutes. The Epic is still produced to this day.

In the early 1990s, Specialized introduced the Globe range of urban bikes; it had a major relaunch in 2009, which saw Globe become its own distinct brand. After a hiatus in production, the Globe line currently produces cargo e-bikes.

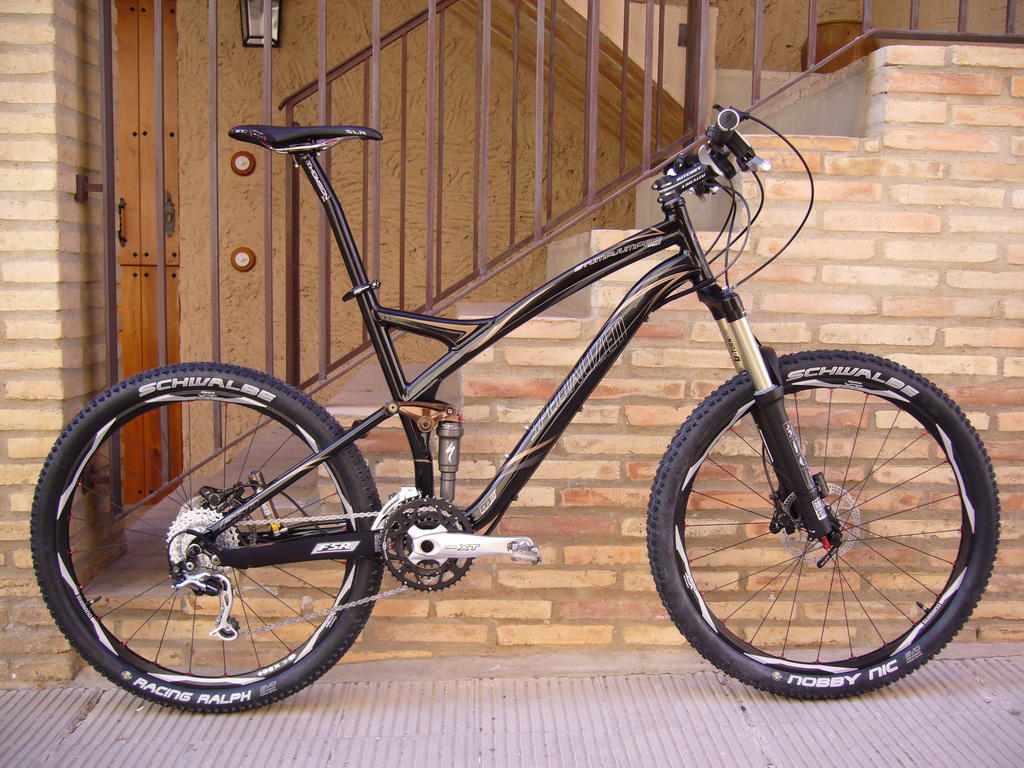
A 2008 Specialized Stumpjumper with full suspension

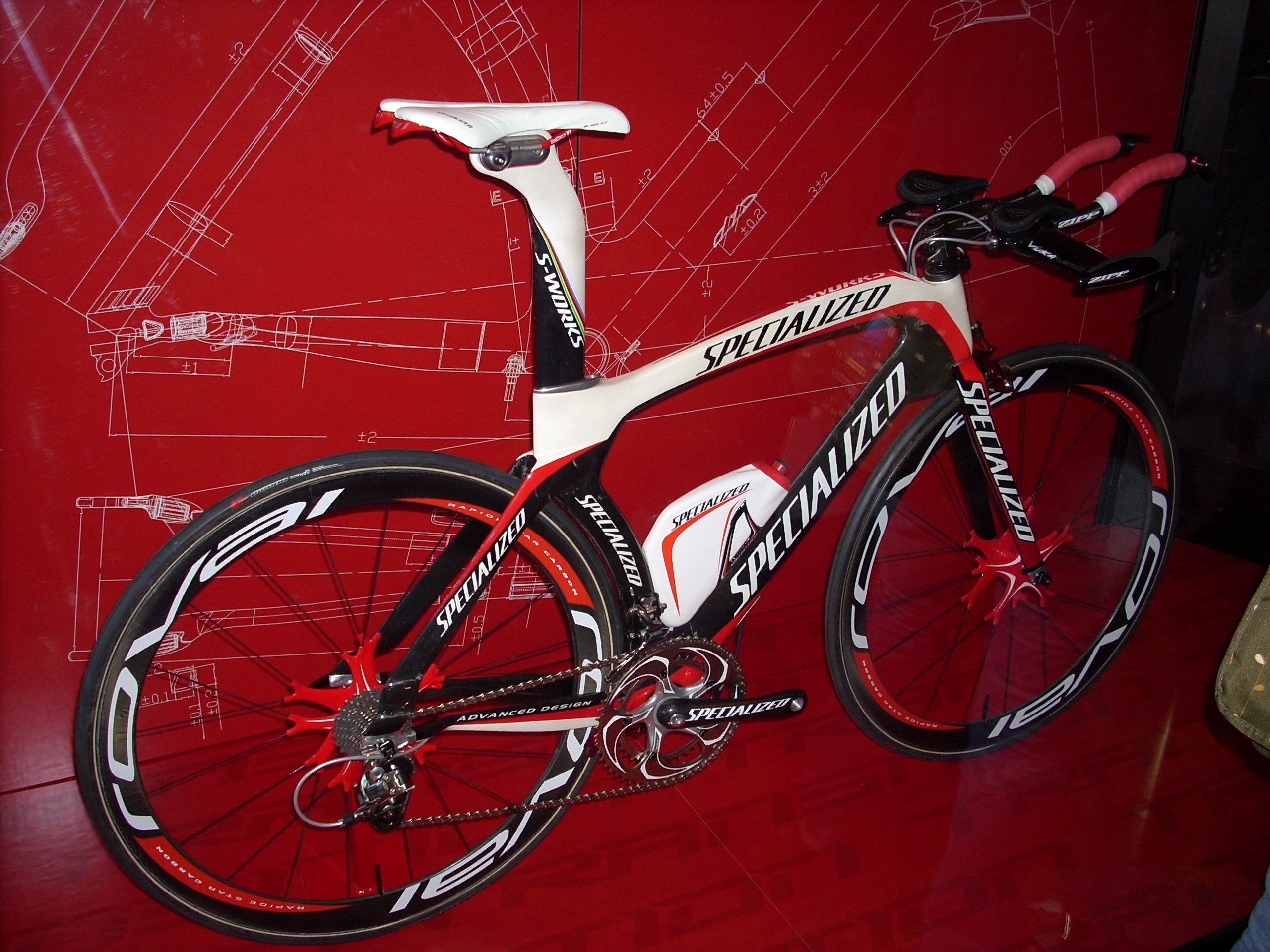
A 2008 Specialized S-Works Transition carbon triathlon/time trial bike

In 1995, Specialized launched the Full Force brand. Full Force was a lower-end mountain bike brand sold through sporting goods stores and discount retailers such as Costco. The move angered some Specialized dealers. In 1996, Specialized withdrew the Full Force line, and Mike Sinyard wrote a letter of apology to dealers. By the end of 1996, Specialized had lost 30% of its bike shop sales and, according to Sinyard, "came within a few hundred dollars of declaring bankruptcy".

In 2001, Merida Bikes of Taiwan bought 49% of Specialized (initially reported as 19%) for a reported US$30 million. Mike Sinyard remained majority owner and CEO of the company. As of 2016, Specialized is one of the biggest bicycle brands operating in the United States, alongside Trek Bicycle Corporation and Giant Bicycles.

In 2012, the company invested in Retül, a proprietary bike fitting system

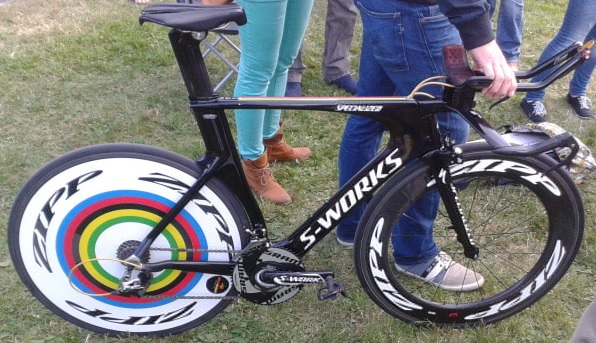
2014 time trial bike of world champion Ellen van Dijk

In 2012, Specialized issued a recall for about 12,000 bicycles sold through retailers from 2007 until July 2012 due to a faulty fork. Recalled models include the company's Globe products.

As of 2023, a customized version of the Specialized Rockhopper mountain bike is used by the London Ambulance Service for their Cycle Response Units which operate in congested areas of the city.

== Litigation ==
In 1990, Specialized tried to sue RockShox Inc, claiming the company's name too closely resembled the bicycle model name Rockhopper The case was ultimately dismissed with prejudice.

In 2006, Specialized sent Mountain Cycle a letter concerning its use of the model name "Stumptown" (nickname for Portland), alleging it resembled the Specialized model name Stumpjumper. Mountain Cycle closed shortly thereafter.

In 2009, Specialized had a trademark dispute with a manufacturer of bicycle bags, Epic Designs, now Revelate Designs.

In 2010, Specialized took NASCAR driver and team owner Robby Gordon to court over the logo used for his Speed Energy drink brand, claiming it was visually similar to their own 'S' logo. Gordon sued Specialized after receiving a cease-and-desist letter in September 2010 and Specialized then counter-sued Gordon. Gordon was ordered by the court to remove the Speed 'S' logo from his cars and later agreed with Specialized he would change the drink's logo.

In 2011, Portland wheel builder Epic Wheel Works was forced to change its name due to potential trademark conflict with Specialized.

In 2012, the company sued two former employees after they started the bicycle brand Volagi Cycles, for theft of trade secrets and breach of employment contract, as well as other charges. Of Specialized's nine claims, eight were thrown out of court, and the jury awarded Specialized one dollar in damages on the remaining count (breach of employment contract) that went to trial. It was estimated by (Volagi's founders) Choi and Forsman's attorney, Tyler Paetkau, that Specialized incurred more than $2 million in legal fees to practice "competition by litigation." In September 2016, Volagi announced that it would close after a founding member was injured in a bicycle crash involving an automobile.

In 2013, Specialized mailed a small bike shop owner in Canada a cease and desist letter over its use of the city name Roubaix in its shop name and wheels, the name of a town in France that rose to prominence as a textile center in the 15th century and has hosted a bicycle race since 1896. This follows on from Specialized's trademarking of the word in Canada. The situation and behavior towards the shop owner caused some reactions from cyclists worldwide after an article was published by the Calgary Herald in early December 2013. On 9 December Fuji Bikes owner, Advanced Sports International said that they are the legal owner of worldwide rights to the Roubaix trademark. Fuji has had a Fuji Roubaix road bike model in its lineup since 1992, and has licensed the name to Specialized since 2003. The dispute between Specialized, ASI and the Canadian shop owner was resolved in December 2013, and Specialized vowed to be more cautious in its pursuit of trademark violators in the future.

In 2014, Specialized forced bicycle builder Neil Pryde to change the name of their Alize bike model.

== Professional rider sponsorship ==
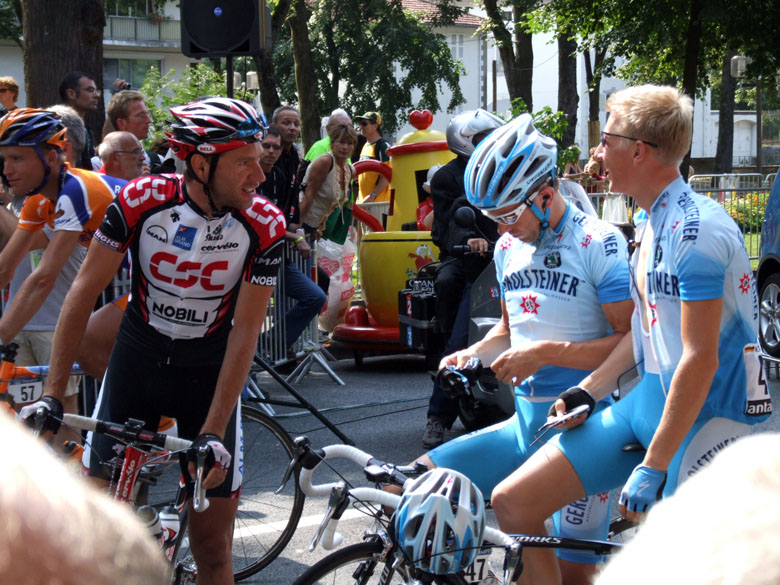
Team Gerolsteiner riders (right) with Specialized bikes and gear

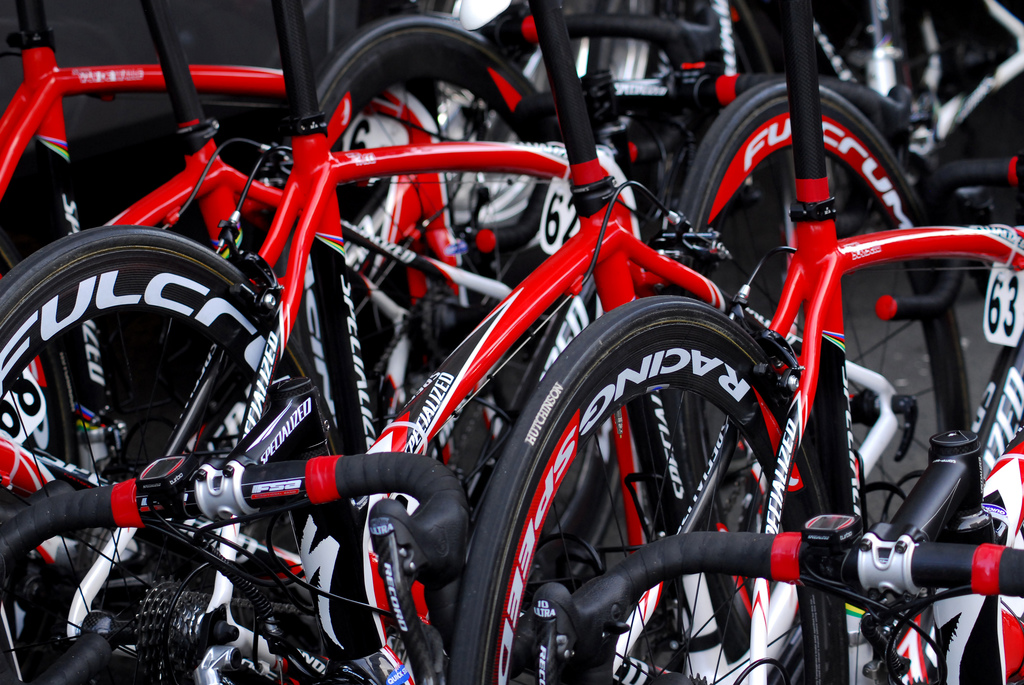
Specialized bikes of the Quick Step team, Tour of California, February 2007

=== Road ===
Many riders in recent years have used Specialized bicycles in the North American and European professional cycling circuits. In 2019, the professional road teams sponsored by Specialized are Soudal-Quick-Step, Bora–Hansgrohe, SD Worx and Team TotalEnergies.

=== Mountain ===
Mountain bike riders sponsored by Specialized include the downhill world champion Loïc Bruni, Finn Iles, Jaroslav Kulhavý, Christoph Sauser, Lea Davison, Martin Soderstrom, Simon Andreassen, Sam Gaze, Ned Overend, Christopher Blevins, Hannah Barnes, Annika Langvad, 2:1 Racing, Nicholi Rogatkin, Curtis Robinson, Matt Hunter and Howard Grotts.

=== Triathlon ===
Sponsored triathletes include Brent McMahon, Jenson Button, Rubén Ruzafa, Non Stanford, Conrad Stoltz, Melissa Hauschildt, Tim Don, Lisa Norden, Chris McCormack, Francisco Javier Gómez Noya, Gwen Jorgensen and Ben Hoffman.

== See also ==
- NRL Racing Development Cycling Team (2005)
