= JUNB =

Protein-coding gene in the species Homo sapiens

Identifiers
- Aliases: JUNB, AP-1, JunB proto-oncogene, AP-1 transcription factor subunit
- External IDs: OMIM: 165161; MGI: 96647; GeneCards: JUNB

Gene location (Human)
Chr.	Chromosome 19 (human)
Band	19p13.13	Start	12,791,486 bp
Band	19p13.13	End	12,793,315 bp

Gene location (Mouse)
Chr.	Chromosome 8 (mouse)
Band	8 C3|8 41.41 cM	Start	85,701,113 bp
Band	8 C3|8 41.41 cM	End	85,705,347 bp
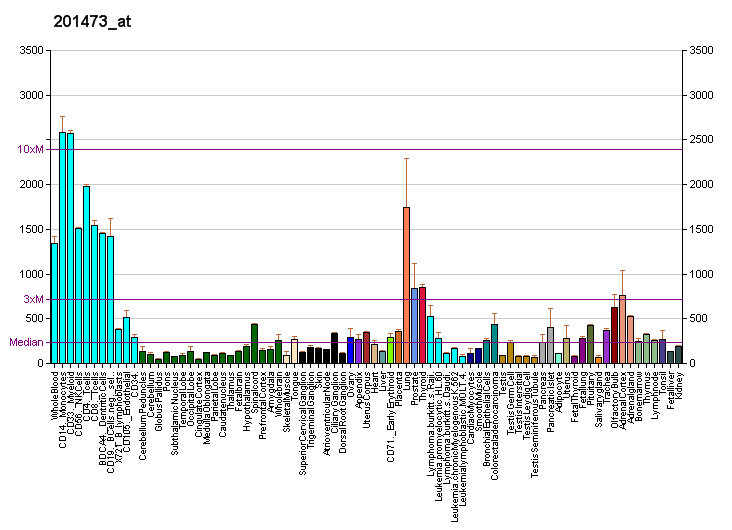
RNA expression pattern
Bgee	Human / Mouse (ortholog); Top expressed in: gastric mucosa; left uterine tube; granulocyte; monocyte; tibial arteries; vena cava; saphenous vein; left ovary; nipple; trachea / Top expressed in: granulocyte; lip; superior surface of tongue; spermatid; spermatocyte; corneal stroma; visual cortex; esophagus; transitional epithelium of urinary bladder; primary visual cortex; More reference expression data
BioGPS	More reference expression data
Gene ontology
Molecular function	DNA binding; RNA polymerase II transcription regulatory region sequence-specific DNA binding; transcription corepressor activity; DNA-binding transcription factor activity; transcription coactivator activity; DNA-binding transcription activator activity, RNA polymerase II-specific; transcription factor binding; RNA polymerase II cis-regulatory region sequence-specific DNA binding; protein binding; DNA-binding transcription factor activity, RNA polymerase II-specific
Cellular component	nucleoplasm; chromatin; nucleus; transcription factor AP-1 complex; transcription regulator complex
Biological process	cellular response to calcium ion; regulation of transcription, DNA-templated; regulation of transcription by RNA polymerase II; regulation of cell death; osteoclast differentiation; labyrinthine layer blood vessel development; in utero embryonic development; negative regulation of transcription by RNA polymerase II; transcription by RNA polymerase II; regulation of cell cycle; vasculogenesis; embryonic process involved in female pregnancy; response to lipopolysaccharide; decidualization; regulation of cell population proliferation; trophectodermal cell differentiation; osteoblast differentiation; positive regulation of cell differentiation; response to radiation; osteoblast proliferation; cellular process or phenomenon; response to cAMP; response to mechanical stimulus; transcription, DNA-templated; cellular response to hormone stimulus; response to cytokine; positive regulation of transcription by RNA polymerase II; cytokine-mediated signaling pathway; response to organic substance
Sources:Amigo / QuickGO
Orthologs
Databases	NCBI: entry; OMA: entry
Species	Human	Mouse
Entrez	3726	16477
Ensembl	ENSG00000171223	ENSMUSG00000052837
UniProt	P17275	P09450
RefSeq (mRNA)	NM_002229	NM_008416
RefSeq (protein)	NP_002220	NP_032442
Location (UCSC)	Chr 19: 12.79 – 12.79 Mb	Chr 8: 85.7 – 85.71 Mb
PubMed search
- Wikidata
View/Edit Human	View/Edit Mouse

Transcription factor jun-B is a protein that, in humans, is encoded by the JUNB gene. Transcription factor jun-B is a transcription factor involved in regulating gene activity following the primary growth factor response. It binds to the DNA sequence 5'-TGA[CG]TCA-3'.

== Interactions ==
JUNB has been shown to interact with

- BRCA1, and
- SMAD3.

== See also ==
- AP-1 (transcription factor)
