= CREB3 =

Protein-coding gene in the species Homo sapiens

Identifiers
- Aliases: CREB3, LUMAN, LZIP, sLZIP, cAMP responsive element binding protein 3
- External IDs: OMIM: 606443; MGI: 99946; GeneCards: CREB3

Gene location (Human)
Chr.	Chromosome 9 (human)
Band	9p13.3	Start	35,732,598 bp
Band	9p13.3	End	35,736,999 bp

Gene location (Mouse)
Chr.	Chromosome 4 (mouse)
Band	4 A5|4 23.05 cM	Start	43,562,332 bp
Band	4 A5|4 23.05 cM	End	43,567,060 bp
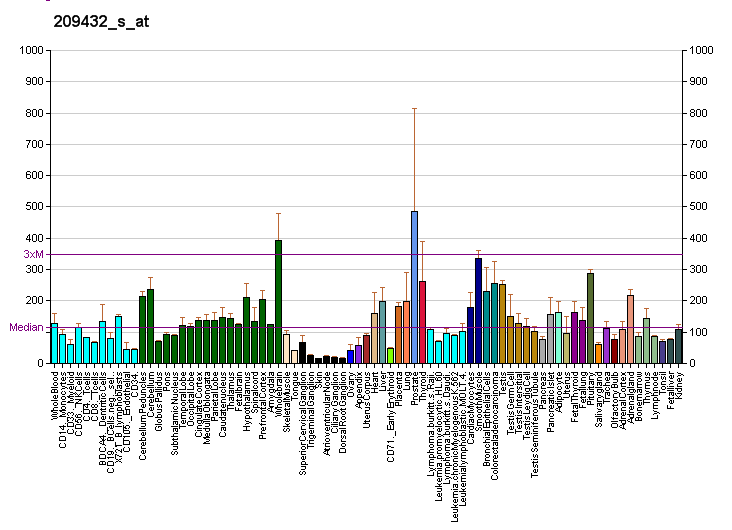
RNA expression pattern
Bgee	Human / Mouse (ortholog); Top expressed in: anterior pituitary; right testis; popliteal artery; tibial arteries; ascending aorta; left testis; Descending thoracic aorta; right adrenal gland; left adrenal gland; left adrenal cortex / Top expressed in: ascending aorta; aortic valve; Paneth cell; Epithelium of choroid plexus; supraoptic nucleus; calvaria; substantia nigra; endothelial cell of lymphatic vessel; pituitary gland; facial motor nucleus; More reference expression data
BioGPS	More reference expression data
Gene ontology
Molecular function	DNA binding; RNA polymerase II transcription regulatory region sequence-specific DNA binding; protein homodimerization activity; protein dimerization activity; cAMP response element binding protein binding; DNA-binding transcription factor activity; CCR1 chemokine receptor binding; DNA-binding transcription activator activity, RNA polymerase II-specific; chromatin binding; RNA polymerase II cis-regulatory region sequence-specific DNA binding; transcription factor activity, RNA polymerase II core promoter proximal region sequence-specific binding; protein binding; cAMP response element binding; DNA-binding transcription factor activity, RNA polymerase II-specific
Cellular component	cytoplasm; integral component of membrane; nuclear body; endoplasmic reticulum membrane; membrane; integral component of endoplasmic reticulum membrane; soma; endoplasmic reticulum; nucleus; cytosol; Golgi membrane; nucleoplasm; Golgi apparatus
Biological process	negative regulation of endoplasmic reticulum stress-induced intrinsic apoptotic signaling pathway; regulation of transcription, DNA-templated; release from viral latency; positive regulation of cell migration; cytoplasmic sequestering of transcription factor; negative regulation of cell cycle; positive regulation of monocyte chemotaxis; transcription, DNA-templated; response to endoplasmic reticulum stress; induction of positive chemotaxis; positive regulation of transcription, DNA-templated; chemotaxis; response to unfolded protein; regulation of cell population proliferation; regulation of cell growth; establishment of viral latency; positive regulation of deacetylase activity; positive regulation of transcription from RNA polymerase II promoter involved in unfolded protein response; viral process; positive regulation of transcription by RNA polymerase II; positive regulation of defense response to virus by host; positive regulation of calcium ion transport; transcription by RNA polymerase II; endoplasmic reticulum unfolded protein response; regulation of apoptotic process
Sources:Amigo / QuickGO
Orthologs
Databases	NCBI: entry; OMA: entry
Species	Human	Mouse
Entrez	10488	12913
Ensembl	ENSG00000107175	ENSMUSG00000028466
UniProt	O43889	Q61817
RefSeq (mRNA)	NM_006368	NM_013497
RefSeq (protein)	NP_006359	n/a
Location (UCSC)	Chr 9: 35.73 – 35.74 Mb	Chr 4: 43.56 – 43.57 Mb
PubMed search
- Wikidata
View/Edit Human	View/Edit Mouse

Cyclic AMP-responsive element-binding protein 3 is a protein that in humans is encoded by the CREB3 gene.

This gene encodes a transcription factor that is a member of the leucine zipper family of DNA binding proteins. This protein binds to the cAMP-responsive element, an octameric palindrome. The protein interacts with host cell factor C1, which also associates with the herpes simplex virus (HSV) protein VP16 that induces transcription of HSV immediate-early genes. This protein and VP16 both bind to the same site on host cell factor C1. It is thought that the interaction between this protein and host cell factor C1 plays a role in the establishment of latency during HSV infection. An additional transcript variant has been identified, but its biological validity has not been determined.

== Interactions ==
CREB3 has been shown to interact with Host cell factor C1.

== See also ==
- CREB
