= NFIL3 =

Protein-coding gene in the species Homo sapiens

Identifiers
- Aliases: NFIL3, E4BP4, IL3BP1, NF-IL3A, NFIL3A, nuclear factor, interleukin 3 regulated
- External IDs: OMIM: 605327; MGI: 109495; GeneCards: NFIL3

Gene location (Human)
Chr.	Chromosome 9 (human)
Band	9q22.31	Start	91,409,045 bp
Band	9q22.31	End	91,423,832 bp

Gene location (Mouse)
Chr.	Chromosome 13 (mouse)
Band	13 B1|13 27.68 cM	Start	53,121,245 bp
Band	13 B1|13 27.68 cM	End	53,135,109 bp
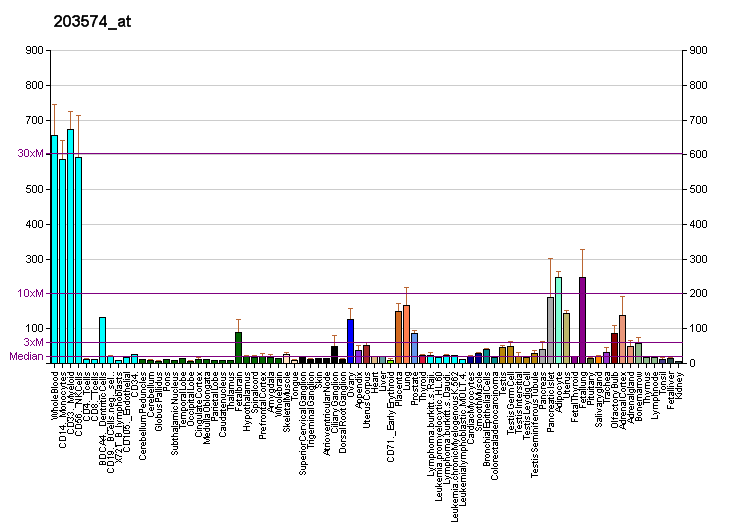
RNA expression pattern
Bgee	Human / Mouse (ortholog); Top expressed in: vena cava; pericardium; gastric mucosa; left uterine tube; cartilage tissue; popliteal artery; tibial arteries; stromal cell of endometrium; periodontal fiber; right ventricle / Top expressed in: muscle of thigh; gastrula; granulocyte; zygote; primary oocyte; secondary oocyte; digastric muscle; left lobe of liver; plantaris muscle; sternocleidomastoid muscle; More reference expression data
BioGPS	More reference expression data
Gene ontology
Molecular function	DNA-binding transcription factor activity; DNA binding; DNA-binding transcription repressor activity, RNA polymerase II-specific; RNA polymerase II transcription regulatory region sequence-specific DNA binding; protein binding; transcription corepressor activity; RNA polymerase II cis-regulatory region sequence-specific DNA binding; DNA-binding transcription factor activity, RNA polymerase II-specific; identical protein binding
Cellular component	nucleus
Biological process	cellular response to interleukin-4; positive regulation of gene expression; regulation of transcription, DNA-templated; negative regulation of transcription by RNA polymerase II; transcription by RNA polymerase II; circadian rhythm; immune response; transcription, DNA-templated; rhythmic process; negative regulation of transcription, DNA-templated; positive regulation of transcription, DNA-templated
Sources:Amigo / QuickGO
Orthologs
Databases	NCBI: entry; OMA: entry
Species	Human	Mouse
Entrez	4783	18030
Ensembl	ENSG00000165030	ENSMUSG00000056749
UniProt	Q16649	O08750
RefSeq (mRNA)	NM_005384; NM_001289999; NM_001290000	NM_017373
RefSeq (protein)	NP_001276928; NP_001276929; NP_005375	NP_059069
Location (UCSC)	Chr 9: 91.41 – 91.42 Mb	Chr 13: 53.12 – 53.14 Mb
PubMed search
- Wikidata
View/Edit Human	View/Edit Mouse

Nuclear factor, interleukin 3 regulated, also known as NFIL3 or E4BP4, is a protein which in humans is encoded by the NFIL3 gene.

== Function ==
Expression of interleukin-3 (IL-3) is restricted to activated T cells, natural killer (NK) cells, and mast cell lines. Transcription initiation depends on the activating capacity of specific protein factors, such as NFIL3, that bind to regulatory regions of the gene, usually upstream of the transcription start site.
