= CREB5 =

Protein-coding gene in the species Homo sapiens

Identifiers
- Aliases: CREB5, CRE-BPA, CREB-5, cAMP responsive element binding protein 5, CREBPA
- External IDs: OMIM: 618262; MGI: 2443973; GeneCards: CREB5

Gene location (Human)
Chr.	Chromosome 7 (human)
Band	7p15.1-p14.3	Start	28,299,321 bp
Band	7p15.1-p14.3	End	28,825,894 bp

Gene location (Mouse)
Chr.	Chromosome 6 (mouse)
Band	6 B3|6 25.9 cM	Start	53,264,255 bp
Band	6 B3|6 25.9 cM	End	53,677,361 bp
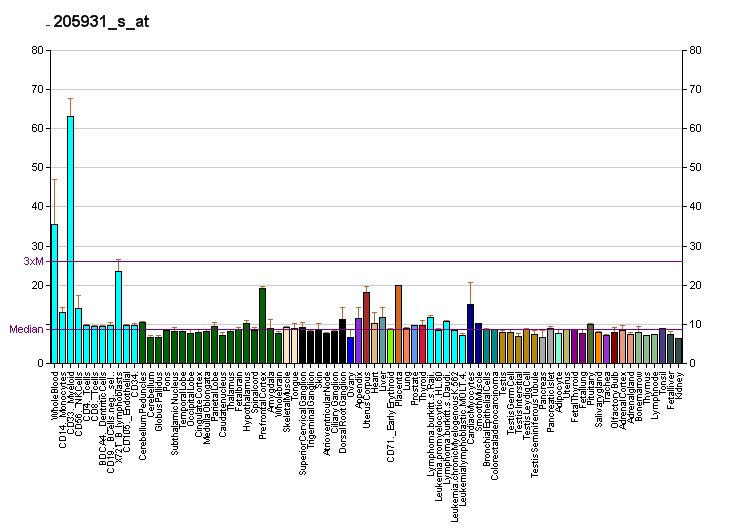
RNA expression pattern
Bgee	Human / Mouse (ortholog); Top expressed in: synovial joint; ventricular zone; blood; corpus callosum; tendon of biceps brachii; monocyte; inferior ganglion of vagus nerve; synovial membrane; internal globus pallidus; cartilage tissue / Top expressed in: hand; ascending aorta; aortic valve; foot; lumbar subsegment of spinal cord; hair follicle; ventricular zone; genital tubercle; external carotid artery; internal carotid artery; More reference expression data
BioGPS	More reference expression data
Gene ontology
Molecular function	DNA binding; protein binding; metal ion binding; nucleic acid binding; DNA-binding transcription factor activity; DNA-binding transcription factor activity, RNA polymerase II-specific
Cellular component	extracellular exosome; nucleus
Biological process	positive regulation of transcription, DNA-templated; regulation of transcription, DNA-templated; transcription by RNA polymerase II; transcription, DNA-templated; regulation of transcription by RNA polymerase II
Sources:Amigo / QuickGO
Orthologs
Databases	NCBI: entry; OMA: entry
Species	Human	Mouse
Entrez	9586	231991
Ensembl	ENSG00000146592	ENSMUSG00000053007
UniProt	Q02930	Q8K1L0
RefSeq (mRNA)	NM_001011666; NM_004904; NM_182898; NM_182899	NM_172728; NM_001327821
RefSeq (protein)	NP_001011666; NP_004895; NP_878901; NP_878902	NP_001314750; NP_766316
Location (UCSC)	Chr 7: 28.3 – 28.83 Mb	Chr 6: 53.26 – 53.68 Mb
PubMed search
- Wikidata
View/Edit Human	View/Edit Mouse

Cyclic AMP-responsive element-binding protein 5 is a protein that in humans is encoded by the CREB5 gene.

The product of this gene belongs to the CRE (cAMP response element)-binding protein family. Members of this family contain zinc finger and bZIP DNA-binding domains. The encoded protein specifically binds to CRE as a homodimer or a heterodimer with c-Jun or CRE-BP1, and functions as a CRE-dependent trans-activator. Alternatively spliced transcript variants encoding different isoforms have been identified.
