= Molecular cellular cognition =

Branch of neuroscience

Molecular cellular cognition (MCC) is a branch of neuroscience that involves the study of cognitive processes with approaches that integrate molecular, cellular and behavioral mechanisms. Key goals of MCC studies include the derivation of molecular and cellular explanations of cognitive processes, as well as finding mechanisms and treatments for cognitive disorders.

Although closely connected with behavioral genetics, MCC emphasizes the integration of molecular and cellular explanations of behavior, instead of focusing on the connections between genes and behavior.

Unlike cognitive neuroscience, which historically has focused on the connection between human brain systems and behavior, the field of MCC has used model organisms, such as mice, to study how molecular (i.e. receptor, kinase activation, phosphatase regulation), intra-cellular (i.e. dendritic processes), and inter-cellular processes (i.e. synaptic plasticity; network representations such as place fields) modulate cognitive function.

Methods employed in MCC include (but are not limited to) transgenic organisms (i.e. mice), viral vectors, pharmacology, in vitro and in vivo electrophysiology, optogenetics, in vivo imaging, and behavioral analysis. Modeling has become an essential component of the field because of the complexity of the multilevel data generated.

== Scientific roots ==
The field of MCC has its roots in the pioneering pharmacological studies of the role of NMDA receptor in long-term potentiation and spatial learning and in studies that used knockout mice to look at the role of the alpha calcium calmodulin kinase II and FYN kinase in hippocampal long-term potentiation and spatial learning. The field has since expanded to include a large array of molecules including CREB.

== Foundation of the field ==
MCC became an organized field with the formation of the Molecular Cellular Cognition Society, an organization with no membership fees and meetings that emphasize the participation of junior scientists. Its first meeting took place in Orlando, Florida on November first, 2002. As of 2012, the society had organized numerous meetings in North America, Europe, and Asia, and included more than 4000 members.
