= NRL (gene) =

Protein-coding gene in the species Homo sapiens

Identifiers
- Aliases: NRL, D14S46E, NRL-MAF, RP27, neural retina leucine zipper
- External IDs: OMIM: 162080; MGI: 102567; GeneCards: NRL

Gene location (Human)
Chr.	Chromosome 14 (human)
Band	14q11.2-q12	Start	24,078,662 bp
Band	14q11.2-q12	End	24,115,010 bp

Gene location (Mouse)
Chr.	Chromosome 14 (mouse)
Band	14 C3|14 28.19 cM	Start	55,756,435 bp
Band	14 C3|14 28.19 cM	End	55,762,438 bp
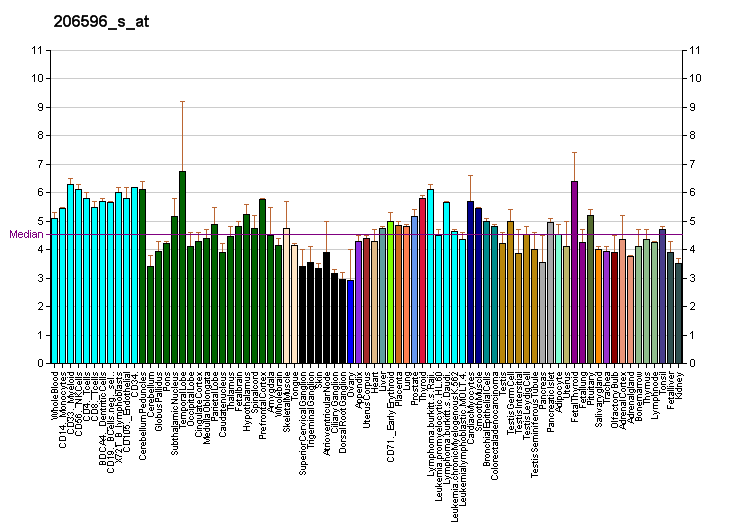

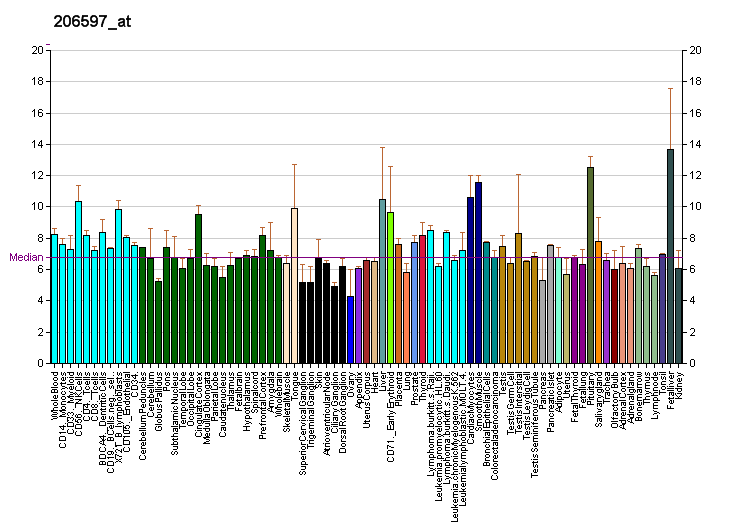
RNA expression pattern
Bgee	Human / Mouse (ortholog); Top expressed in: testicle; muscle of thigh; right lobe of liver; granulocyte; C1 segment; prefrontal cortex; gonad; apex of heart; human kidney; amygdala / Top expressed in: neural layer of retina; retinal pigment epithelium; epithelium of lens; outer nuclear layer; ciliary body; iris; cornea; conjunctival fornix; ganglion cell layer; morula; More reference expression data
BioGPS	More reference expression data
Gene ontology
Molecular function	DNA-binding transcription factor activity; RNA polymerase II cis-regulatory region sequence-specific DNA binding; DNA binding; leucine zipper domain binding; DNA-binding transcription activator activity, RNA polymerase II-specific; protein binding; promoter-specific chromatin binding; transcription coactivator activity; sequence-specific DNA binding; DNA-binding transcription factor activity, RNA polymerase II-specific
Cellular component	nucleoplasm; cytosol; nucleus; cytoplasm
Biological process	multicellular organism development; regulation of transcription, DNA-templated; transcription by RNA polymerase II; transcription, DNA-templated; visual perception; response to stimulus; retinal rod cell development; positive regulation of transcription by RNA polymerase II
Sources:Amigo / QuickGO
Orthologs
Databases	NCBI: entry; OMA: entry
Species	Human	Mouse
Entrez	4901	18185
Ensembl	ENSG00000129535; ENSG00000285493	ENSMUSG00000040632
UniProt	P54845	P54846
RefSeq (mRNA)	NM_006177; NM_001354768; NM_001354769; NM_001354770	NM_001136074; NM_001271916; NM_001271917; NM_008736
RefSeq (protein)	NP_006168; NP_001341697; NP_001341698; NP_001341699	NP_001129546; NP_001258845; NP_001258846; NP_032762
Location (UCSC)	Chr 14: 24.08 – 24.12 Mb	Chr 14: 55.76 – 55.76 Mb
PubMed search
- Wikidata
View/Edit Human	View/Edit Mouse

Neural retina-specific leucine zipper protein is a protein that in humans is encoded by the NRL gene.

== Function ==
This gene encodes a basic motif-leucine zipper transcription factor of the Maf subfamily. The encoded protein is conserved among vertebrates and is a critical intrinsic regulator of photoreceptor cell development and function. Mutations in this gene have been associated with retinitis pigmentosa and degenerative diseases of the retina.

== See also ==
- Transcription factor
