= CREB in cognition =

The cellular transcription factor CREB (cAMP response element-binding protein) helps learning and the stabilization and retrieval of fear-based, long-term memories. This is done mainly through its expression in the hippocampus and the amygdala. Studies supporting the role of CREB in cognition include those that knock out the gene, reduce its expression, or overexpress it.

== Memory ==
Research suggests that CREB has a role in the molecular steps that stabilize memory in the brain, including that of emotional memory. CREB modulates neuron excitability, meaning the propensity to generate an action potential upon receiving an input (crucial for long-term potentiation, LTP). Evidence of CREB's role in emotional memory falls into three experimental categories: negative manipulations (where the levels of CREB were lowered), positive manipulations (where the levels of CREB were increased), and non-interventions (where the endogenous levels of CREB were tracked before and after learning).

== Knockout ==
Knockout studies in Aplysia sea slugs indicated that decreasing CREB function blocks long-term changes in synaptic function, but not short-term ones. Changes in synaptic function (i.e., synaptic plasticity) are required for learning and memory As evidence of this, a line of mice with a targeted disruption of the α and δ isoforms of CREB showed intact short-term memory, but disrupted long-term memory in several behavioral tasks, including contextual conditioning and spatial learning in the Morris water maze, two hippocampal-dependent learning tasks. Also, hippocampal electrophysiological studies revealed that the CREB mutation disrupted the stability of synaptic plasticity Genetic studies in Drosophila fruit flies also uncovered a role for CREB in memory, suggesting that CREB has a role in memory conserved evolutionarily.

== Knockdown ==
There are several methods of knocking down (reducing the expression of) CREB:

=== Antisense ===
Antisense oligonucleotides (single strands of DNA or RNA that are complementary to a chosen sequence) against hippocampal CREB mRNA can lower levels of CREB within 6 hours of infusion and impair spatial memory. Tests given immediately after training showed that the antisense oligonucleotides against CREB do not disrupt short-term memory.

=== Dominant negative ===
Another strategy for interfering with CREB function is the use of a dominant negative transgenic strategy. In this strategy, a fragment of the CREB gene was expressed from a transgene in mice. The resulting transgenic protein was engineered to interfere with the normal function of CREB by competing with wild type (non-mutated) CREB for binding sites in the DNA; the transgenic protein lacks the domains required for making functional complexes. To regulate when the dominant negative CREB fragment interfered with normal CREB function, the mutant DNA was used to generate a fusion protein that also included a mutated ligand-binding domain (LBD) of the estrogen receptor, binding to tamoxifen rather than to estrogen. When exposed to tamoxifen, the dominant negative fragment changed the conformation of the fusion protein, became active, and could therefore interfere with CREB binding sites. One advantage of this inducible transgenic system is that the altered protein is constitutively present and can therefore be rapidly activated following the administration of tamoxifen.

Use of the LBD system to knock down CREB protein function during training (using both contextual freezing and tone fear paradigms) produced a deficit in long-term, but not short-term, memory. Impairing CREB function did not impair retrieval of the consolidated memory.

=== RNA interference ===
Small interfering RNA (siRNA) can induce a selective degradation of the mRNA of the protein of interest. Infusion of siRNA segments against CREB have produced deficits in both contextual conditioning and forward trace conditioning.

== Activation ==
A line of lacZ reporter mice (mice that have E. coli's gene attached to their CREB gene to produce a protein that is easily visualized), when trained with a context protocol, showed higher levels of CREB-mediated transcription in the CA1 and CA3 regions of the hippocampus when compared to untrained mice or mice that did not associated content with shock (in fear conditioning) due to latent inhibition. Likewise, the lacZ mice that were trained with a tone protocol showed higher levels of CREB-dependent gene transcription in the amygdala than either mice with no training or mice in the unpaired group. There was no difference in CREB-dependent gene expression in the hippocampus of animals trained with a tone protocol.

== Rescue ==
When a herpes simplex virus expressing CREB was infused into the amygdala of CREB knockout mice, the expression of CREB in the amygdala rescued the deficit, indicating that amygdal CREB is critical for memory in tone conditioning.

== Overexpression ==
The role of overexpression of CREB has not been examined systematically in fear conditioning, and studies of other conditioning paradigms has produced mixed results. A 2001 study, which used viral transfection to overexpress CREB in the basolateral amygdala of rats, found that overexpression increased the fear-potentiated startle response. This suggests that CREB levels are limiting during the acquisition of fear-potentiated startle and that these levels are related to the strength of this form of memory.

A more recent paper (2009), using a similar viral approach in the hippocampus, found that additional CREB expression could also enhance contextual fear conditioning, a result consistent with a role of the hippocampus in this form of conditioning. While viral CREB reversed the conditioning deficits in CREB knockout animals, additional CREB did not seem to enhance memory of the wild-type controls.

Chronic enhancement of CREB, using genetic manipulations in mice, did not seem to enhance memory in a water maze task. Another 2009 study, which overexpressed CREB using the tetracycline transgenic dox system, found that, while additional CREB did not enhance acquisition, it did interfere with memory retrieval, suggesting that there may be an optimal level of CREB activation for normal memory function. Other papers suggest that CREB helps control intrinsic excitability, providing an additional mechanism by which CREB can contribute to memory acquisition and expression. Enhanced CREB-dependent gene expression increases the excitability of neurons in the basal amygdala and primes the consolidation of contextual and cued fear memory.
