= CAMP responsive element modulator =

Protein found in humans

CREM
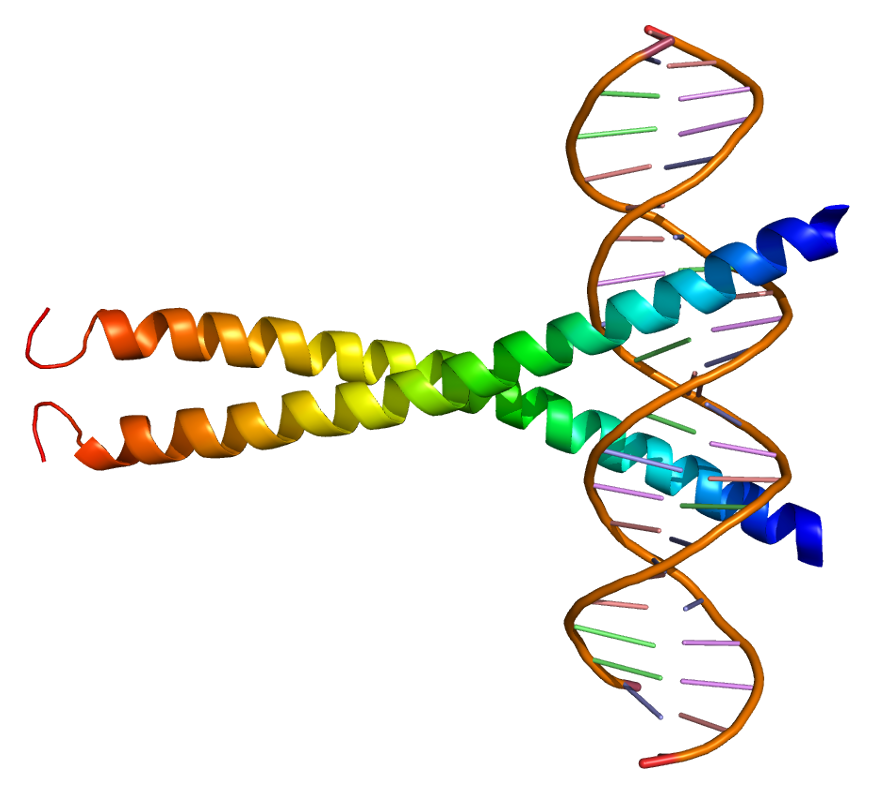

Identifiers
- Aliases: CREM, CREM-2, ICER, hCREM-2, cAMP responsive element modulator
- External IDs: OMIM: 123812; MGI: 88495; GeneCards: CREM

Gene location (Human)
Chr.	Chromosome 10 (human)
Band	10p11.21	Start	35,126,791 bp
Band	10p11.21	End	35,212,958 bp

Gene location (Mouse)
Chr.	Chromosome 18 (mouse)
Band	18|18 A1	Start	3,266,048 bp
Band	18|18 A1	End	3,337,748 bp
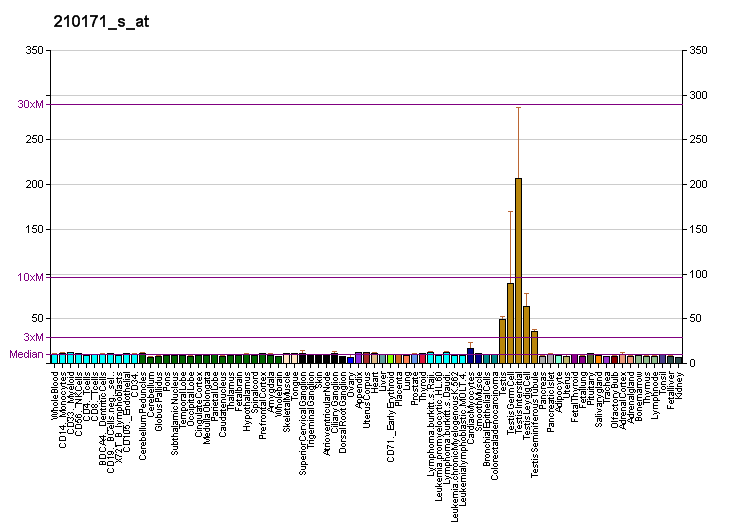

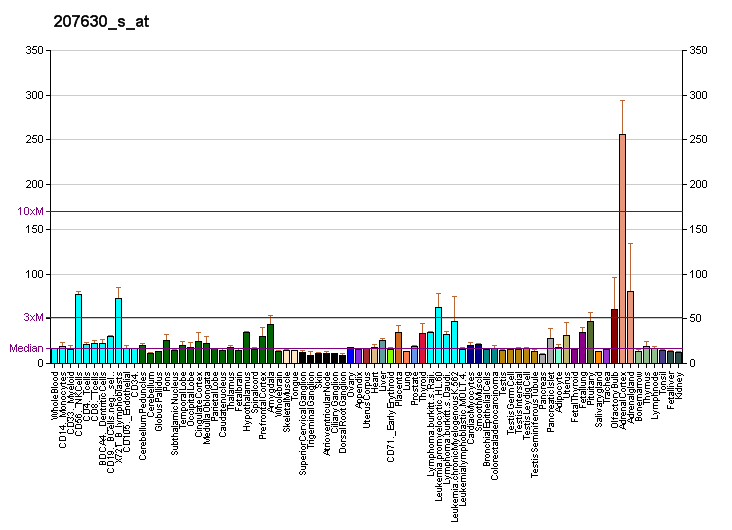

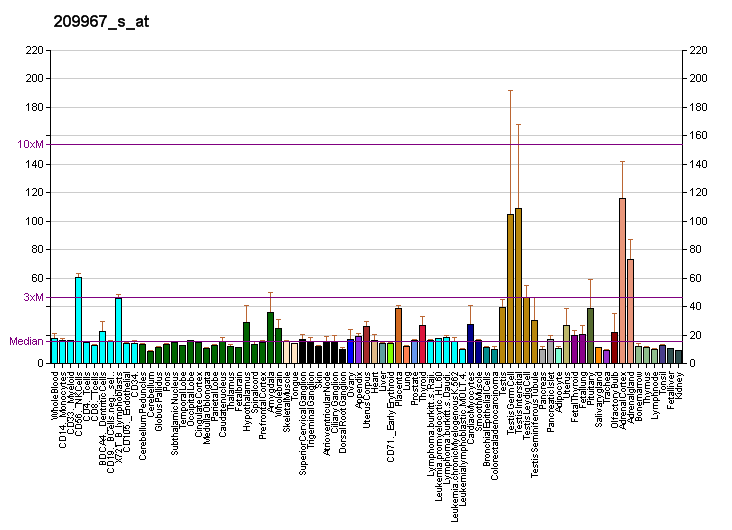
RNA expression pattern
Bgee	Human / Mouse (ortholog); Top expressed in: left testis; right testis; right adrenal cortex; left adrenal cortex; sperm; gallbladder; anterior pituitary; gonad; left uterine tube; C1 segment / Top expressed in: spermatid; spermatocyte; seminiferous tubule; adrenal gland; lumbar spinal ganglion; right kidney; proximal tubule; islet of Langerhans; atrioventricular valve; muscle of thigh; More reference expression data
BioGPS	More reference expression data
Gene ontology
Molecular function	DNA binding; cAMP response element binding protein binding; DNA-binding transcription factor activity; protein binding; RNA polymerase II transcription regulatory region sequence-specific DNA binding; DNA-binding transcription repressor activity, RNA polymerase II-specific; DNA-binding transcription factor activity, RNA polymerase II-specific
Cellular component	cytoplasm; transcription regulator complex; nucleus
Biological process	cell differentiation; regulation of transcription, DNA-templated; glycosphingolipid metabolic process; rhythmic process; transcription, DNA-templated; fatty acid metabolic process; multicellular organism development; retinoic acid receptor signaling pathway; regulation of circadian rhythm; spermatogenesis; glucose metabolic process; positive regulation of transcription by RNA polymerase II; signal transduction; negative regulation of transcription by RNA polymerase II
Sources:Amigo / QuickGO
Orthologs
Databases	NCBI: entry; OMA: entry
Species	Human	Mouse
Entrez	1390	12916
Ensembl	ENSG00000095794	ENSMUSG00000063889
UniProt	Q03060	P27699
RefSeq (mRNA)	NM_001267562; NM_001267563; NM_001267564; NM_001267565; NM_001267566 NM_001267567; NM_001267568; NM_001267569; NM_001267570; NM_001881; NM_181571; NM_182717; NM_182718; NM_182719; NM_182720; NM_182721; NM_182722; NM_182723; NM_182724; NM_182725; NM_182769; NM_182770; NM_182771; NM_182772; NM_182850; NM_182853; NM_183011; NM_183012; NM_183013; NM_183060; NM_001352445; NM_001352446; NM_001352465; NM_001352466; NM_001352467; NM_001394595; NM_001394598; NM_001394600; NM_001394602; NM_001394603; NM_001394605; NM_001394608; NM_001394610; NM_001394613; NM_001394614; NM_001394615; NM_001394616; NM_001394617; NM_001394618; NM_001394619; NM_001394620; NM_001394621; NM_001394622; NM_001394623; NM_001394625; NM_001394626; NM_001394627; NM_001394628; NM_001394629; NM_001394630; NM_001394631	NM_001110850; NM_001110851; NM_001110852; NM_001110853; NM_001110854 NM_001110855; NM_001110856; NM_001110857; NM_001110858; NM_001110859; NM_001271503; NM_001271504; NM_001271505; NM_001271506; NM_013498; NM_001311066; NM_001311067; NM_001374833
RefSeq (protein)	NP_001254491; NP_001254492; NP_001254493; NP_001254494; NP_001254495 NP_001254496; NP_001254497; NP_001254498; NP_001254499; NP_001872; NP_853549; NP_874386; NP_874387; NP_874388; NP_874389; NP_874390; NP_874392; NP_874393; NP_877570; NP_877571; NP_877572; NP_877573; NP_898829; NP_898830; NP_898831; NP_898883; NP_001339374; NP_001339375; NP_001339394; NP_001339395; NP_001339396	NP_001104320; NP_001104321; NP_001104322; NP_001104323; NP_001104324 NP_001104325; NP_001104326; NP_001104327; NP_001104328; NP_001104329; NP_001258432; NP_001258433; NP_001258434; NP_001258435; NP_001297995; NP_001297996; NP_038526; NP_001361762
Location (UCSC)	Chr 10: 35.13 – 35.21 Mb	Chr 18: 3.27 – 3.34 Mb
PubMed search
- Wikidata
View/Edit Human	View/Edit Mouse

cAMP responsive element modulator is a protein that in humans is encoded by the CREM gene, and it belongs to the cAMP-responsive element binding protein family. It has multiple isoforms, which act either as repressors or activators. CREB family is important for in regulating transcription in response to various stresses, metabolic and developmental signals. CREM transcription factors also play an important role in many physiological systems, such as cardiac function, circadian rhythms, locomotion and spermatogenesis.

== Function ==
This gene encodes a bZIP transcription factor that binds to the cAMP responsive element found in many viral and cellular promoters. It is an important component of cAMP-mediated signal transduction during the spermatogenetic cycle, as well as other complex processes. Alternative promoter and translation initiation site usage allows this gene to exert spatial and temporal specificity to cAMP responsiveness. Multiple alternatively spliced transcript variants encoding several different isoforms have been found for this gene, with some of them functioning as activators and some as repressors of transcription.

== Gene location ==
The chromosomal location of CREM gene is at 10p11.21, where it starts at 35415769 and ends at 35501886 bp from pter (according to hg19-Feb_2009)

== Interactions ==
CAMP responsive element modulator has been shown to interact with FHL5.

== Disease relevance of CREM ==
=== Panic disorder ===
One study reported the DNA sequence variations in the gene for CREM in panic disorder patients. It showed a significant excess of the shorter eight-repeat allele and of genotypes containing the eight-repeat allele in panic disorder patients. The observed associations were limited to panic disorder without agoraphobia, and they were more prominent in females. But, the independent Italian and Spanish samples in this study did not support their results. Another family-based study showed little evidence of any susceptibility locus for panic disorder either within the CREM gene or in a nearby region on chromosome 10p11

=== Spermiogenesis deficiency ===
CREM has been shown to be a master-switch regulator in testis. It plays an important role in the regulation of the expression of post-meiotic genes, and this has been supported by several studies using CREM-mutation mice. The results showed the first step in the process of sperm formation would be blocked if the germ cell development in mice CREM gene were disrupted. The cAMP response element sites can be found in the promoter region of some postmeiotic genes, so that the CREM can target and regulate these genes.

Two studies proved that treatment of rats with Salvia hypoleuca and Alpina galanga can significantly increased the CREM gene expression.

=== Systemic lupus erythematousus ===
Less IL-2 will be produced from T cells in humans or mice with systemic lupus erythematousus (SLE). Some studies showed that an increased level CREM was presented in the nucleus of T lymphocytes from SLE patients. The CREM bound to the -180 site of the IL-2 promoter to repress its transcription.
