= NRL Racing Development Cycling Team =

Team information
- UCI code: NRL
- Registered: United States
- Founded: 2005
- Discipline: Mountain Bike
- Status: USA Cycling Team
- Bicycles: Specialized Bicycles

Key personnel
- General manager: Nitish Nag

Team name history
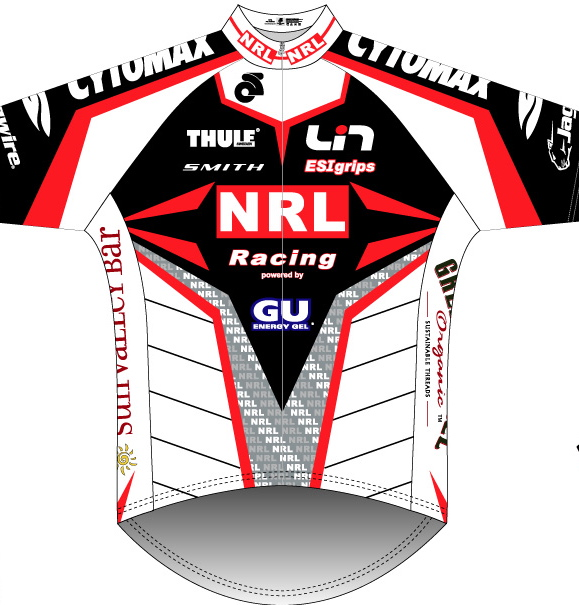
NRL Racing Development Cycling Team jersey
Jersey

NRL Racing Development Cycling Team is a non-profit California, United States–based USA Cycling bike racing team established in 2005. The director and general manager is Nitish Nag.

== Mission statements ==
- Produce the next generation of fine bicycle racers.
- Fight metabolic disease such as cardiovascular disease, obesity and diabetes.
- Develop leadership within the community and individuals.
- Raise environmental awareness and stewardship.

== Sponsors ==
The team's title sponsor is Nag Research Laboratories, a biotechnology and pharmaceutical company based out of Fremont, California. The presenting sponsor of the team is KATRA, a group of companies in the wellness and agricultural industries. Other sponsors of the team include Smith Optics, Thule Racks, Osprey Packs, KMC Chains, Red Bull Energy Drink, Jagwire Cable Systems, ESI Grips, Gu Energy, Kinesys Sunscreen, All Terrain Co., Lin Socks, Adventure Medical Kits, Green Label Organic Clothing, Specialized Bicycles, Pedros, Crankbrothers, and is a member of the International Mountain Biking Association (IMBA).

== Competition ==
The team competes in all disciplines of cycling including road racing, gravity racing, cyclocross, but focuses on cross country mountain biking. Athletes on the team also compete for their respective college and high school teams. The current elite team are all students or alumni of UC Berkeley's cycling team, Cal Cycling.

== Major results ==
USA Cycling Stenner Scholarship 2011: Nitish Nag

4th, (United States) USA National Championship Collegiate Mountain Bike Omnium: Nitish Nag
2nd, (California) WCCC Men's A Collegiate Mountain Bike Omnium 2010: Nitish Nag:

(California) WCCC Men's A Collegiate Mountain Bike Omnium Leader for 2 Stages 2010: Nitish Nag::

2nd, (California) WCCC Men's A Collegiate Mountain Bike Omnium 2008: Nitish Nag:

1st, 5 Man Team classification : 24 Hours of Laguna Seca: Outdoor Idol Award 2007: Nitish Nag

2nd, (California) WCCC Men's A Collegiate Stanford XC Race 2010: Jordan Kestler:
1st, Howell Mountain Challenge Cat 1 XC Race 2010: Chris Belnap

2nd, Skyline Park MTB Cat 1 XC Race 2010: Chris Belnap

3rd, Tamarancho Dirt Classic Cat 1 XC Race 2010: Chris Belnap

2nd, BBC Criterium Race 2010: Chris Belnap

1st, Downieville Classic Cat 1 XC Race 2008: Chris Belnap

1st, San Bruno Hill Climb Cat 3 Race 2010: Jordan Kestler

1st, Napa Valley Dirt Classic Cat 1 XC Race 2010: Jordan Kestler

3rd, Sea Otter Classic Cat 1 XC Race 2010: Jordan Kestler

3rd, (California) WCCC Men's A Collegiate CP SLO Individual Time Trial: Jordan Kestler

== Elite team ==
NRL Racing also supports a grassroots based team of 20 racers which is mentored by the Elite Team.

Rider	Date of birth
Chris Belnap (USA)	May 7, 1980 (age 46)
Jordan Kestler (USA)	February 10, 1990 (age 36)
Nitish Nag (USA)	June 9, 1989 (age 37)

== See also ==
- Cycling team
- Glossary of cycling
- List of UCI Professional Continental and Continental teams
- Outline of cycling
