= Denise Cai =

American neuroscientist and researcher

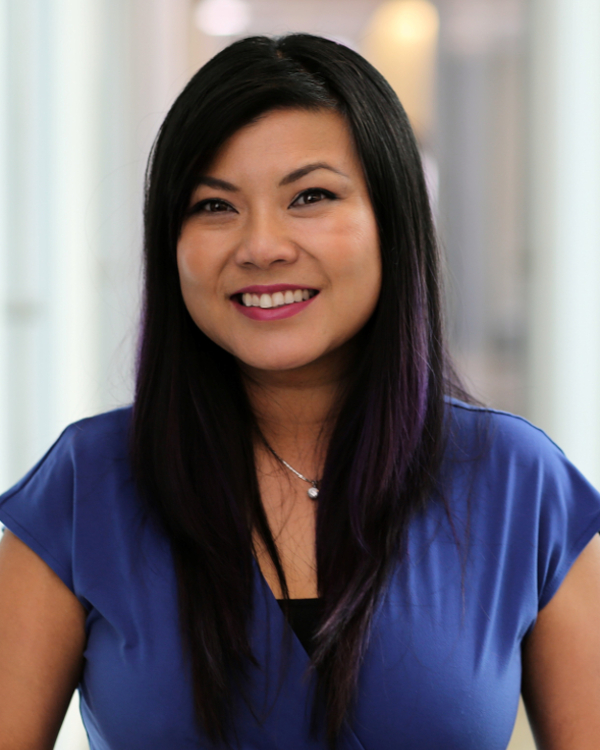
- Education: University of California, San Diego, PhD, 2010 University of California, San Diego, BS, 2004
- Scientific career
- Thesis: Evidence for sleep-dependent memory consolidation in human and mice (2010)
- Doctoral advisor: Sara Mednick

Denise Cai is an Associate Professor of Neuroscience at the Icahn School of Medicine at Mount Sinai.

== Education and early career ==
Cai attended the University of California, San Diego, where she received her Bachelor of Science in psychology in 2004. There, she performed an honors thesis under the mentorship of Ebbe Ebbesen entitled "Computational model of rape and assault cases." She continued her education at UCSD, pursuing her doctoral degree in Psychology and Behavioral Neuroscience, working with advisors Sara Mednick, Stephan Anagnostaras, and Michael Gorman. Her graduate work focused on how sleep affects memory formation in humans and in mice. In humans, she found that rapid eye movement (REM) sleep facilitates creative thinking, compared to quiet rest and non-REM sleep. Specifically, she found that REM sleep enhances the integration of unassociated memories and is associated with processes of abstraction and generalization that facilitate problem solving and discovery.

Cai received her Ph.D. in 2010 and then moved to the University of California, Los Angeles for a postdoctoral fellowship in the laboratories of Alcino J. Silva and Peyman Golshani. She pursued this work with the support of a Ruth L. Kirschstein National Research Service Award from the National Institutes of Health.

== Research ==
In 2017, Cai became an assistant professor in the department of neuroscience at the Icahn School of Medicine at Mount Sinai. There, her research program centers on investigating memory formation.

== Awards and honors ==
- Distinguished Scholar Award, Icahn School of Medicine at Mount Sinai, 2020
- National Institutes of Health Director's New Innovator Award, 2019
- One Mind Rising Star Research Award, 2019
- Klingenstein-Simons Fellowship, 2018
- Allen Institute Next Generation Leader, 2017
