= Genetic memory =

Genetic memory may refer to:

- Genetic memory (psychology), a memory present at birth that exists in the absence of sensory experience
- Genetic memory (computer science), an artificial neural network combination of genetic algorithm and the mathematical model of sparse distributed memory
