= CREB =

Class of proteins

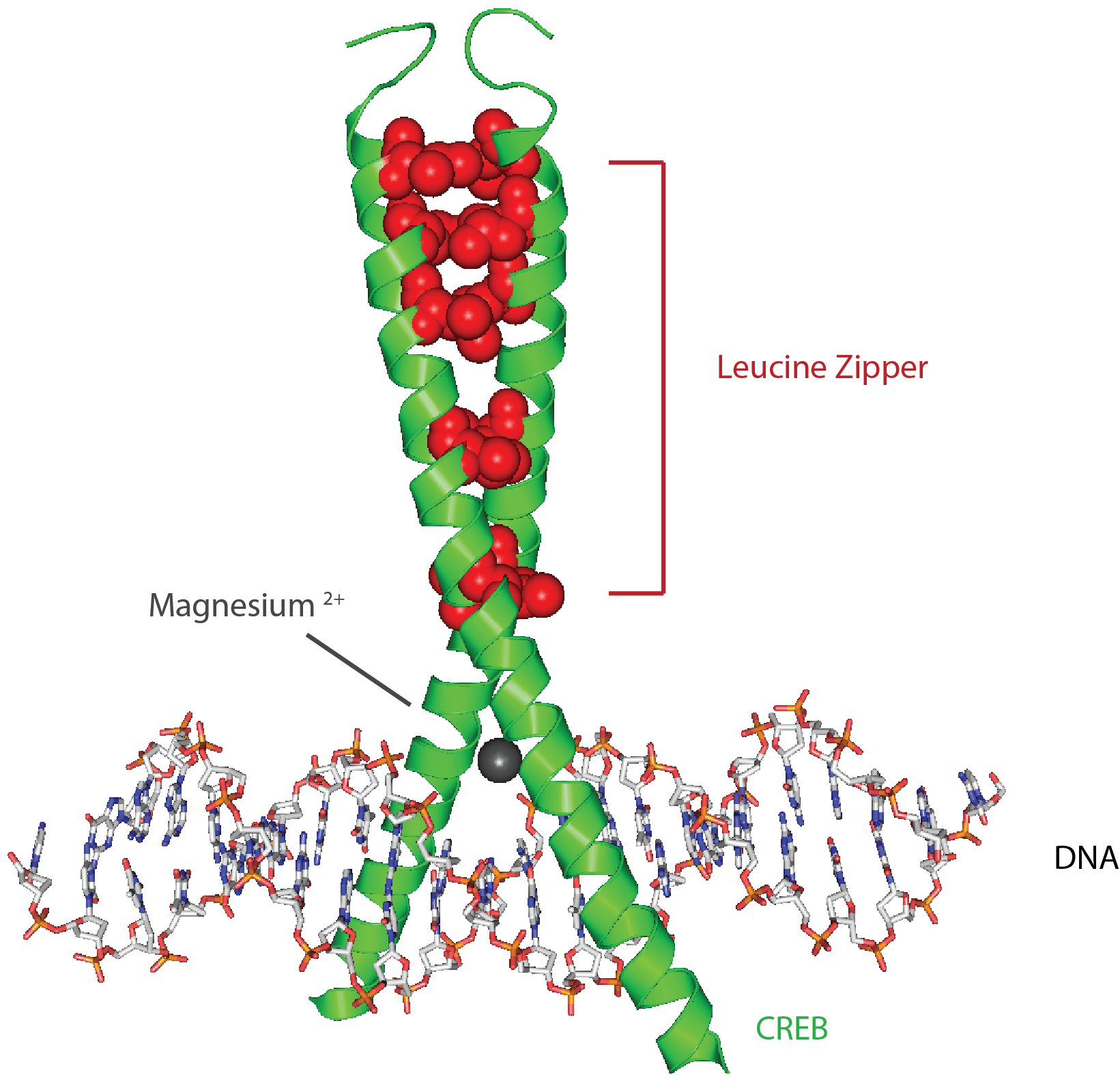
CREB (top) is a transcription factor capable of binding DNA (bottom) and regulating gene expression.

CREB-TF (CREB, cAMP response element-binding protein) is a cellular transcription factor. It binds to certain DNA sequences called cAMP response elements (CRE), thereby increasing or decreasing the transcription of the genes. CREB was first described in 1987 as a cAMP-responsive transcription factor regulating the somatostatin gene.

Genes whose transcription is regulated by CREB include: c-fos, BDNF, tyrosine hydroxylase, numerous neuropeptides (such as somatostatin, enkephalin, VGF, corticotropin-releasing hormone), and genes involved in the mammalian circadian clock (PER1, PER2).

CREB is closely related in structure and function to CREM (cAMP response element modulator) and ATF-1 (activating transcription factor-1) proteins. CREB proteins are expressed in many animals, including humans.

CREB has a well-documented role in neuronal plasticity and long-term memory formation in the brain and has been shown to be integral in the formation of spatial memory. CREB downregulation is implicated in the pathology of Alzheimer's disease and increasing the expression of CREB is being considered as a possible therapeutic target for Alzheimer's disease. CREB also has a role in photoentrainment in mammals.

== Subtypes ==
The following genes encode CREB or CREB-like proteins:

- CREB1 (CREB1)
- CREB2 renamed ATF4 (ATF4)
- CREB3 (CREB3)
- CREB5 (CREB5)
- CREB3L1 (CREB3L1)
- CREB3L2 (CREB3L2)
- CREB3L3 (CREB3L3)
- CREB3L4 (CREB3L4)

== Structure ==
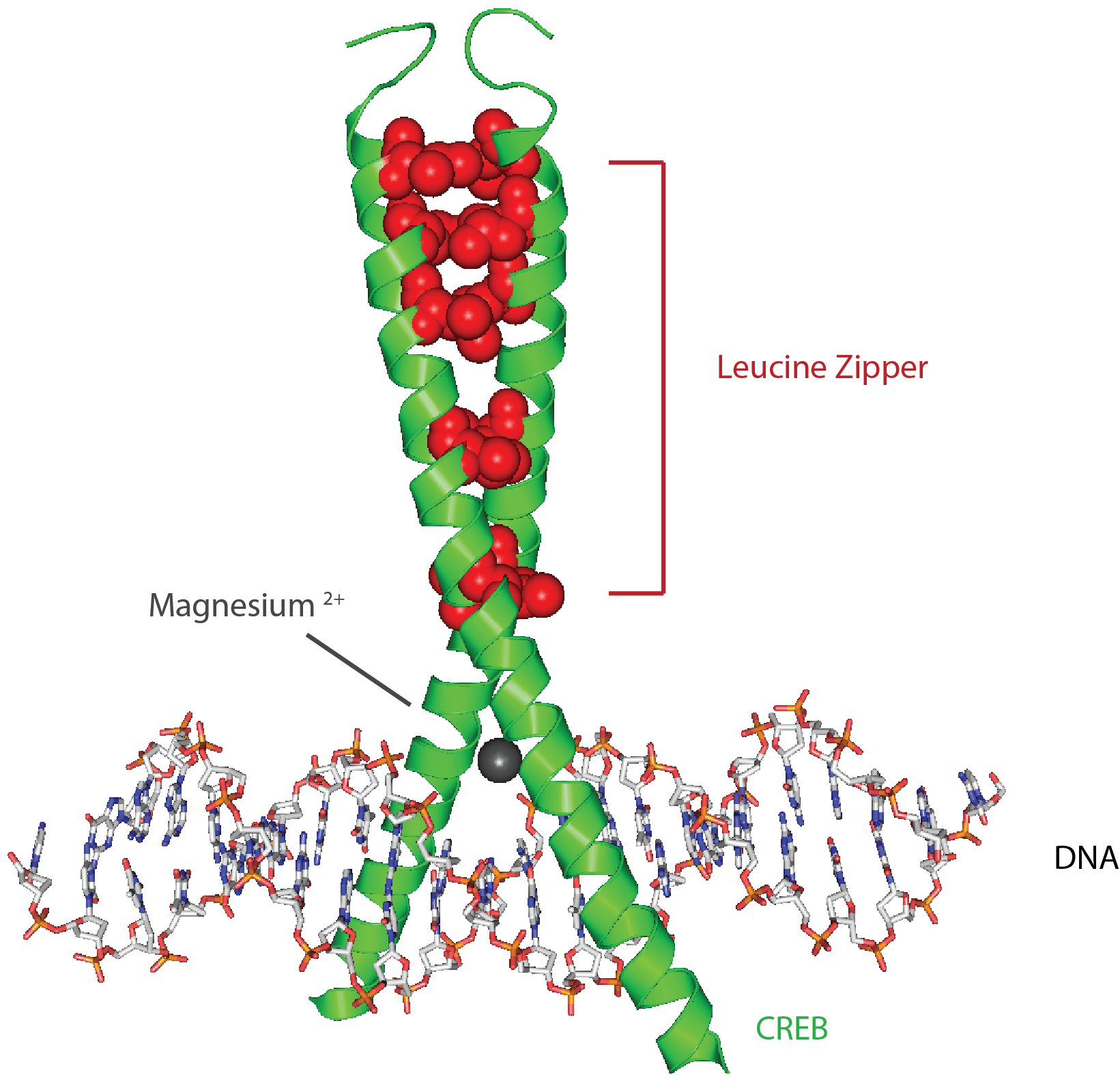
General structure of the CREB protein

CREB proteins are activated by phosphorylation from various kinases, including PKA, and Ca^{2+}/calmodulin-dependent protein kinases on the Serine 133 residue. When activated, CREB protein recruits other transcriptional coactivators to bind to CRE promoter 5’ upstream region. Hydrophobic leucine amino acids are located along the inner edge of the alpha helix. These leucine residues tightly bind to leucine residues of another CREB protein forming a dimer. This chain of leucine residues forms the leucine zipper motif. The protein also has a magnesium ion that facilitates binding to DNA.

=== cAMP response element ===
The cAMP response element (CRE) is the response element for CREB which contains the highly conserved nucleotide sequence, 5'-TGACGTCA-3’. CRE sites are typically found upstream of genes, within the promoter or enhancer regions. There are approximately 750,000 palindromic and half-site CREs in the human genome. However, the majority of these sites remain unbound due to cytosine methylation, which physically obstructs protein binding.

== Mechanism of action ==
A generalized sequence of events is summarized as follows: A signal arrives at the cell surface, activates the corresponding receptor, which leads to the production of a second messenger such as cAMP or Ca^{2+}, which in turn activates a protein kinase. This protein kinase translocates to the cell nucleus, where it activates a CREB protein. The activated CREB protein then binds to a CRE region, and is then bound to by CBP (CREB-binding protein), which coactivates it, allowing it to switch certain genes on or off. The DNA binding of CREB is mediated via its basic leucine zipper domain (bZIP domain) as depicted in the image. Evidence suggests the β-adrenoceptor (a G-protein coupled receptor) stimulates CREB signalling.

== Function in the brain ==
CREB has many functions in many different organs, and some of its functions have been studied in relation to the brain. CREB proteins in neurons are thought to be involved in the formation of long-term memories; this has been shown in the marine snail Aplysia, the fruit fly Drosophila melanogaster, in rats and in mice. CREB is necessary for the late stage of long-term potentiation. CREB also has an important role in the development of drug addiction and even more so in psychological dependence. There are activator and repressor forms of CREB. Flies genetically engineered to overexpress the inactive form of CREB lose their ability to retain long-term memory. CREB is also important for the survival of neurons, as shown in genetically engineered mice, where CREB and CREM were deleted in the brain. If CREB is lost in the whole developing mouse embryo, the mice die immediately after birth, again highlighting the critical role of CREB in promoting neuronal survival.

== Disease linkage ==
Disturbance of CREB-binding protein in the brain can contribute to the development and progression of Huntington's disease.

Abnormalities of a protein that interacts with the KID domain of CREB, the CREB-binding protein, (CBP) is associated with Rubinstein–Taybi syndrome.

There is some evidence to suggest that the under-functioning of CREB is associated with major depressive disorder. Depressed rats with an overexpression of CREB in the dentate gyrus behaved similarly to rats treated with antidepressants. From post-mortem examinations it has also been shown that the cortices of patients with untreated major depressive disorder contain reduced concentrations of CREB compared to both healthy controls and patients treated with antidepressants. The function of CREB can be modulated via a signalling pathway resulting from the binding of serotonin and noradrenaline to post-synaptic G-protein coupled receptors. Dysfunction of these neurotransmitters is also implicated in major depressive disorder.

CREB is also thought to be involved in the growth of some types of cancer. Potent inhibitors of CREB (e.g. 666-15) have been identified and they showed anti-cancer activities in various preclinical cancer models.

== Involvement in circadian rhythms ==
Entrainment of the mammalian circadian clock is established via light induction of PER. Light excites melanopsin-containing photosensitive retinal ganglion cells which signal to the suprachiasmatic nucleus (SCN) via the retinohypothalamic tract (RHT). Excitation of the RHT signals the release of glutamate which is received by NMDA receptors on SCN, resulting in a calcium influx into the SCN. Calcium induces the activity of Ca^{2+}/calmodulin-dependent protein kinases, resulting in the activation of PKA, PKC, and CK2. These kinases then phosphorylate CREB in a circadian manner that further regulates downstream gene expression. The phosphorylated CREB recognizes the cAMP Response Element and serves as a transcription factor for Per1 and Per2, two genes that regulate the mammalian circadian clock. This induction of PER protein can entrain the circadian clock to light/dark cycles inhibits its own transcription via a transcription-translation feedback loop which can advance or delay the circadian clock. However, the responsiveness of PER1 and PER2 protein induction is only significant during the subjective night.

=== Discovery of CREB involvement in circadian rhythms ===
Michael Greenberg first demonstrated the role of CREB in the mammalian circadian clock in 1993 through a series of experiments that correlated phase-specific light pulses with CREB phosphorylation. In vitro, light during the subjective night increased phosphorylation of CREB rather than CREB protein levels. In vivo, phase shift-inducing light pulses during the subjective night correlated with CREB phosphorylation in the SCN. Experiments by Gunther Schutz in 2002 demonstrated that mutant mice lacking the Ser142 phosphorylation site failed to induce the clock regulatory gene mPer1 in response to a light pulse. Furthermore, these mutant mice had difficulty entraining to light-dark cycles.
