= Ophthalmic acid =

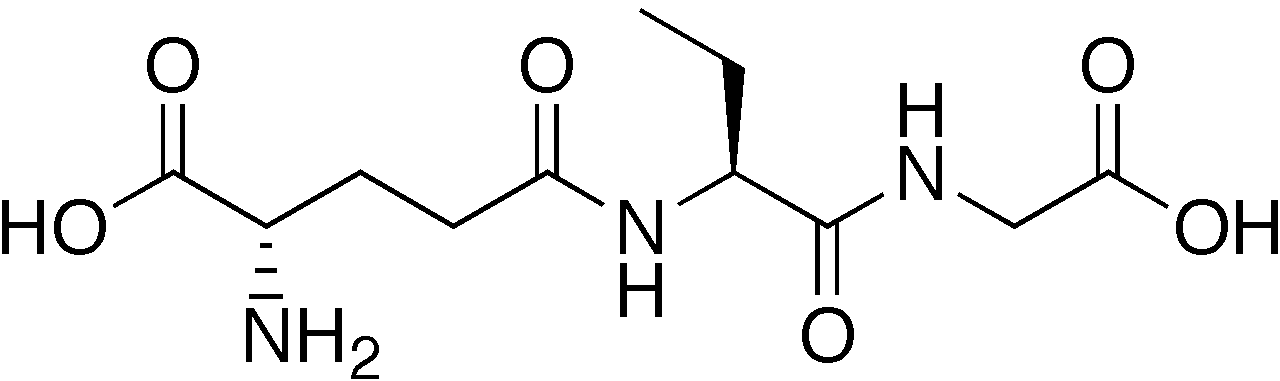
- Stereo, skeletal formula of ophthalmic acid

Names
- IUPAC name (N-(L-γ-Glutamyl)-(2S)-2-aminobutyryl)glycine

Identifiers
CAS Number	495-27-2
3D model (JSmol)	Interactive image
ChEBI	CHEBI:84058
ChemSpider	5381695
MeSH	ophthalmic+acid
PubChem CID	7018721
UNII	3A60475Q1Q
CompTox Dashboard (EPA)	DTXSID40895053
- InChI: InChI=1S/C11H19N3O6/c1-2-7(10(18)13-5-9(16)17)14-8(15)4-3-6(12)11(19)20/h6-7H,2-5,12H2,1H3,(H,13,18)(H,14,15)(H,16,17)(H,19,20)/t6-,7-/m0/s1 Key: JCMUOFQHZLPHQP-BQBZGAKWSA-N
- SMILES: CC[C@H](NC(=O)CC[C@H](N)C(O)=O)C(=O)NCC(O)=O

Properties
Chemical formula	C_{11}H_{19}N_{3}O_{6}
Molar mass	289.288 g·mol^{−1}
Appearance	White crystals

Related compounds
Related alkanoic acids	N-Acetylaspartylglutamic acid; Glycylglycine; α-Aminobutyric acid
- Except where otherwise noted, data are given for materials in their standard state (at 25 °C [77 °F], 100 kPa). verify (what is ?) Infobox references

Ophthalmic acid (OPH), also known as ophthalmate (chemically L-γ-glutamyl-L-α-aminobutyrylglycine), is a tripeptide analog of glutathione. However, instead of the cysteine essential for many of glutathione's diverse functions, it contains L-2-aminobutyrate, a non-proteinogenic amino acid lacking the nucleophilic thiol group. Because of this, it has been widely, and incorrectly, considered an accidental byproduct of glutathione synthesis.

In 2024, an article published by the federation of European biochemistry societies compiled evidence to put forward the major hypothesis that OPH serves as a glutathione regulating tripeptide, affecting both cellular and organelle influx and efflux of GSH, as well as modulating GSH-dependent reactions and signaling.

== Biosynthesis ==
OPH is created using the precursor 2-aminobutyric acid through consecutive reactions of the same enzymes that create GSH, namely Glutamate–cysteine ligase and glutathione synthetase.

Major regulators of OPH biosynthesis are local (relative) concentrations of cysteine and 2-aminobutyric acid, as well as their γ-glutamyl intermediate products.

== Discovery and occurrence ==
OPH was first discovered and isolated from calf lens in 1956, and has since been found to be a ubiquitous metabolite. It is produced by:

- Various bacteria
- Fungi
- Phylogenetically distant plants
- Nematodes like C. elegans
- Insects
- Fish
- Birds
- Various rodents
- Lagomorphs like rabbits
- Mammals (including humans)

Distribution within (higher) organisms also appears to be ubiquitous as it has been found in the:

- Brain
- Eye
- Liver
- Kidney
- Heart
- Gonads
- Ovaries
- muscles
- Adipose tissue
- Blood
- Plasma
- Erythrocytes
- Human feces

In plants, it is found in:

- Seed flour
- Leaves
- Fruit pulp
- Beans

== Ophthalmic acid is not a biomarker of oxidative stress ==
OPH has mostly appeared in metabolomics studies correlating changes in its abundance with oxidative stress, following a study from 2006 on acetaminophen overdose in mice. However, this practice should generally be avoided, as there are major issues:

1. Though some studies indeed find this correlation, the consistent correlation between ophthalmic acid increases and glutathione depletion does not exist. Compared to a healthy baseline, both can go up, both can go down, or ophthalmic acid can go up with no changes in glutathione. A study on circadian rhythm tracking both glutathione and ophthalmic acid levels determined that ophthalmic acid levels were rhythmic, while glutathione levels were not. Ophthalmic acid trends also differ wildly between different tissues in the same animal at the same timepoint, again dispelling the notion of a broader and consistent correlation.
2. The meaning of "biomarker" is much more narrow in this context than many studies assume. Importantly, the Soga et al. study sees a correlation between depleting hepatic glutathione levels, and rising ophthalmic acid levels in plasma, in mice. It solves the practical problem of not being able to directly measure an established glutathione depletion in liver by measuring ophthalmic acid in plasma. However, subsequent studies often measure both glutathione and ophthalmic acid, and when glutathione shows no aberration, ophthalmic acid is used as a "marker" to still claim oxidative stress. There cannot be an appeal to a correlation when the data itself disproves that very correlation.
3. Ophthalmic acid can be found in high concentrations in healthy tissues. For instance in the eye. It is not solely found in stressed or diseased states.
4. The original goal of using ophthalmic acid plasma levels to assess liver damage after acetaminophen overdose has not proven effective in several follow-up studies.

== See also ==
- Aminobutyrate
- Glutathione
- Glutathione synthetase deficiency
- Oxidative stress
