= GCL =

GCL may refer to:

== Computing ==
- GNU Common Lisp
- Guarded Command Language, used for predicate transformer semantics
- Graphical Command Language of Geomview

== Honours ==
- Grand Companion of the Order of Logohu, an honour of Papua New Guinea
- Grand Cross of the Order of Liberty, an honour of Portugal

== Science ==
- Ganglion cell layer
- Geosynthetic clay liner
- Glutamate–cysteine ligase
- Global coordination level

== Sports ==
- Golf Club of Lebanon
- Greater Catholic League, an Ohio high school athletic conference
- Gulf Coast League, a rookie-level Minor League Baseball league

== Transport ==
- Glassboro–Camden Line, a proposed light rail line between Camden and Glassboro in New Jersey
- Gul Circle MRT station, a Mass Rapid Transit station in Tuas, Singapore (MRT station abbreviation)
- Gulf Coast Lines, a defunct American railway company

== Other uses ==
- GCL-Poly, Golden Concord Group Limited, a green energy company
- Government Category List, in the United Kingdom
- Grenadian Creole English, ISO 639-3 code gcl
- Griffith College Limerick, in Ireland
