= Bis-gamma-glutamylcystine reductase =

Class of enzymes

bis-gamma-glutamylcystine reductase

Identifiers
- EC no.: 1.8.1.13
- CAS no.: 117056-54-9

Databases
- IntEnz: IntEnz view
- BRENDA: BRENDA entry
- ExPASy: NiceZyme view
- KEGG: KEGG entry
- MetaCyc: metabolic pathway
- PRIAM: profile
- PDB structures: RCSB PDB PDBe PDBsum
- Gene Ontology: AmiGO / QuickGO
Search
- PMC: articles
- PubMed: articles
- NCBI: proteins

Bis-gamma-glutamylcystine reductase (EC 1.8.1.13) is an enzyme that catalyzes the chemical reaction

bis-γ-glutamylcystine
+ NADPH
H^{+}
H^{+}
2
γ-L-Glutamyl-L-cysteine
+ NADP^{+}

The three substrates of this enzyme are bis-γ-glutamylcystine, reduced nicotinamide adenine dinucleotide phosphate (NADPH), and a proton. Its products are γ-L-Glutamyl-L-cysteine and oxidised NADP^{+}.

This enzyme belongs to the family of oxidoreductases, specifically those acting on a sulfur group of donors with NAD+ or NADP+ as acceptor. The systematic name of this enzyme class is gamma-glutamylcysteine:NADP+ oxidoreductase. This enzyme is also called NADPH2:bis-gamma-glutamylcysteine oxidoreductase. This enzyme participates in glutathione metabolism.
