= Peptide bond =

Covalent bond between amino acids in a protein chain

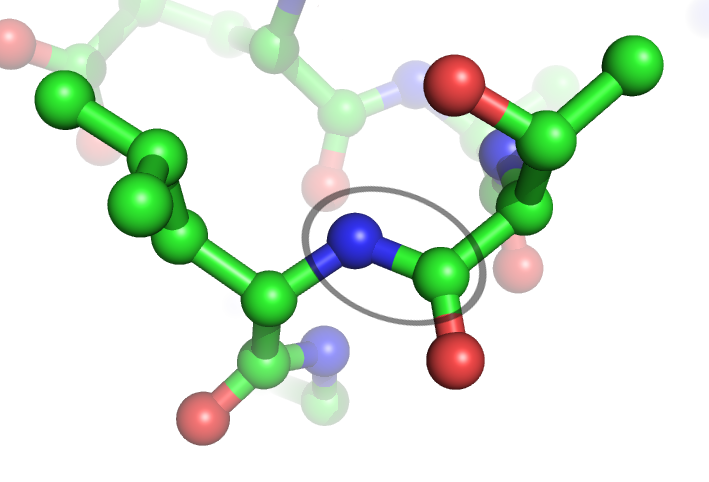
Peptide bond

In organic chemistry, a peptide bond is an amide type of covalent chemical bond linking two consecutive alpha-amino acids from C1 (carbon number one) of one alpha-amino acid and N2 (nitrogen number two) of another, along a peptide or protein chain.

It can also be called a eupeptide bond to distinguish it from an isopeptide bond, which is another type of amide bond between two amino acids.

== Synthesis ==
Peptide bond formation via dehydration reaction

When two amino acids form a dipeptide through a peptide bond, it is a type of condensation reaction. In this kind of reaction, two amino acids approach each other, with the non-side chain (C1) carboxylic acid moiety of one coming near the non-side chain (N2) amino moiety of the other. One amino acid loses a hydrogen and oxygen from its carboxyl group (COOH) and the other amino acid loses a hydrogen from its amino group (NH_{2}). This reaction produces one molecule of water (H_{2}O), as well as two amino acids joined by a peptide bond (−CO−NH−). The two joined amino acids are called a dipeptide.

The amide bond is synthesized when the carboxyl group of one amino acid molecule reacts with the amino group of the other amino acid molecule, causing the release of a molecule of water (H_{2}O), hence the process is a dehydration synthesis chemical reaction.

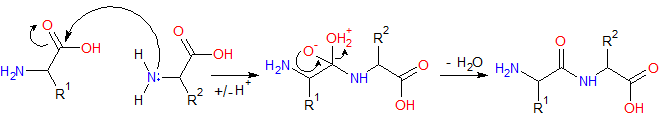
The dehydration condensation of two amino acids to form a peptide bond (red) with expulsion of water (blue) with curly arrow mechanism shown

The formation of the peptide bond consumes energy, which, in organisms, is derived from ATP. Peptides and proteins are chains of amino acids held together by peptide bonds (and sometimes by a few isopeptide bonds). Organisms use enzymes to produce nonribosomal peptides, and ribosomes to produce proteins via reactions that differ in details from dehydration synthesis.

Some peptides, like alpha-amanitin, are called ribosomal peptides as they are made by ribosomes, but many are nonribosomal peptides as they are synthesized by specialized enzymes rather than ribosomes. For example, the tripeptide glutathione is synthesized in two steps from free amino acids, by two enzymes: glutamate–cysteine ligase (forms an isopeptide bond, which is not a peptide bond) and glutathione synthetase (forms a peptide bond).

== Degradation ==
A peptide bond can be broken by hydrolysis (the addition of water). The hydrolysis of peptide bonds in water releases 8–16 kJ/mol (2–4 kcal/mol) of Gibbs energy. This process is extremely slow, with the half life at 25 °C of between 350 and 600 years per bond.

In living organisms, the process is normally catalyzed by enzymes known as peptidases or proteases, although there are reports of peptide bond hydrolysis caused by conformational strain as the peptide/protein folds into the native structure. This non-enzymatic process is thus not accelerated by transition state stabilization, but rather by ground-state destabilization.

== Spectra ==
The wavelength of absorption for a peptide bond is 190–230 nm, which makes it particularly susceptible to UV radiation.

== Cis/trans isomers of the peptide group ==
Significant delocalisation of the lone pair of electrons on the nitrogen atom gives the group a partial double-bond character. The partial double bond renders the amide group planar, occurring in either the cis or trans isomers. In the unfolded state of proteins, the peptide groups are free to isomerize and adopt both isomers; however, in the folded state, only a single isomer is adopted at each position (with rare exceptions). The trans form is preferred overwhelmingly in most peptide bonds (roughly 1000:1 ratio in trans:cis populations). However, X-Pro peptide groups tend to have a roughly 30:1 ratio, presumably because the symmetry between the C^{α} and C^{δ} atoms of proline makes the cis and trans isomers nearly equal in energy, as shown in the figure below.

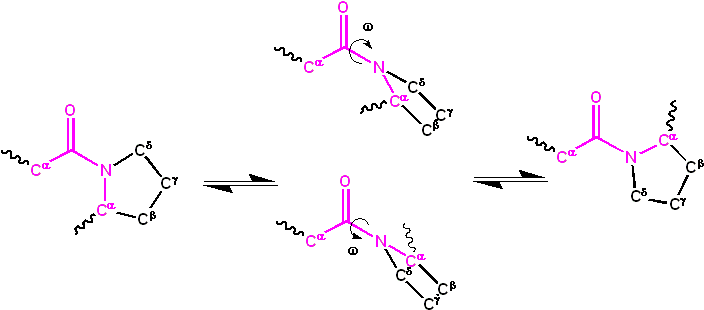
Isomerization of an X-Pro peptide bond. Cis and trans isomers are at far left and far right, respectively, separated by the transition states.

The dihedral angle associated with the peptide group (defined by the four atoms C^{α}–C'–N–C^{α}) is denoted $\omega$; $\omega = 0^\circ$ for the cis isomer (synperiplanar conformation), and $\omega = 180^\circ$ for the trans isomer (antiperiplanar conformation). Amide groups can isomerize about the C'–N bond between the cis and trans forms, albeit slowly ($\tau \sim 20$ seconds at room temperature). The transition states $\omega = \pm 90^\circ$ require that the partial double bond be broken, so that the activation energy is roughly 80 kJ/mol (20 kcal/mol). However, the activation energy can be lowered (and the isomerization catalyzed) by changes that favor the single-bonded form, such as placing the peptide group in a hydrophobic environment or donating a hydrogen bond to the nitrogen atom of an X-Pro peptide group. Both of these mechanisms for lowering the activation energy have been observed in peptidyl prolyl isomerases (PPIases), which are naturally occurring enzymes that catalyze the cis-trans isomerization of X-Pro peptide bonds.

Conformational protein folding is usually much faster (typically 10–100 ms) than cis-trans isomerization (10–100 s). A nonnative isomer of some peptide groups can disrupt the conformational folding significantly, either slowing it or preventing it from even occurring until the native isomer is reached. However, not all peptide groups have the same effect on folding; nonnative isomers of other peptide groups may not affect folding at all.

== Chemical reactions ==
Due to its resonance stabilization, the peptide bond is relatively unreactive under physiological conditions, even less than similar compounds such as esters. Nevertheless, peptide bonds can undergo chemical reactions, usually through an attack of an electronegative atom on the carbonyl carbon, breaking the carbonyl double bond and forming a tetrahedral intermediate. This is the pathway followed in proteolysis and, more generally, in N–O acyl exchange reactions such as those of inteins. When the functional group attacking the peptide bond is a thiol, hydroxyl or amine, the resulting molecule may be called a cyclol or, more specifically, a thiacyclol, an oxacyclol or an azacyclol, respectively.

== See also ==
- The Proteolysis Map
