= 2-oxobutyrate synthase =

Class of enzymes

Identifiers
- EC no.: 1.2.7.2
- CAS no.: 37251-04-0

Databases
- IntEnz: IntEnz view
- BRENDA: BRENDA entry
- ExPASy: NiceZyme view
- KEGG: KEGG entry
- MetaCyc: metabolic pathway
- PRIAM: profile
- PDB structures: RCSB PDB PDBe PDBsum
- Gene Ontology: AmiGO / QuickGO
Search
- PMC: articles
- PubMed: articles
- NCBI: proteins

In enzymology, a 2-oxobutyrate synthase (EC 1.2.7.2) is an enzyme that catalyzes the chemical reaction

2-oxobutanoate + CoA + oxidized ferredoxin $\rightleftharpoons$ propanoyl-CoA + CO_{2} + reduced ferredoxin

The 3 substrates of this enzyme are 2-oxobutanoate, CoA, and oxidized ferredoxin, whereas its 3 products are propanoyl-CoA, CO_{2}, and reduced ferredoxin.

This enzyme belongs to the family of oxidoreductases, specifically those acting on the aldehyde or oxo group of donor with an iron-sulfur protein as acceptor. The systematic name of this enzyme class is 2-oxobutanoate:ferredoxin 2-oxidoreductase (CoA-propanoylating). Other names in common use include alpha-ketobutyrate-ferredoxin oxidoreductase, 2-ketobutyrate synthase, alpha-ketobutyrate synthase, 2-oxobutyrate-ferredoxin oxidoreductase, and 2-oxobutanoate:ferredoxin 2-oxidoreductase (CoA-propionylating). This enzyme participates in propanoate metabolism.
