= Succinate-semialdehyde dehydrogenase (NADP+) =

Identifiers
- EC no.: 1.2.1.79

Databases
- IntEnz: IntEnz view
- BRENDA: BRENDA entry
- ExPASy: NiceZyme view
- KEGG: KEGG entry
- MetaCyc: metabolic pathway
- PRIAM: profile
- PDB structures: RCSB PDB PDBe PDBsum
Search
- PMC: articles
- PubMed: articles
- NCBI: proteins

Succinate-semialdehyde dehydrogenase (NADP^{+}) (EC 1.2.1.79, succinic semialdehyde dehydrogenase (NADP^{+}), succinyl semialdehyde dehydrogenase (NADP^{+}), succinate semialdehyde:NADP^{+} oxidoreductase, NADP-dependent succinate-semialdehyde dehydrogenase, GabD) is an enzyme with systematic name succinate-semialdehyde:NADP^{+} oxidoreductase. This enzyme catalyses the following chemical reaction

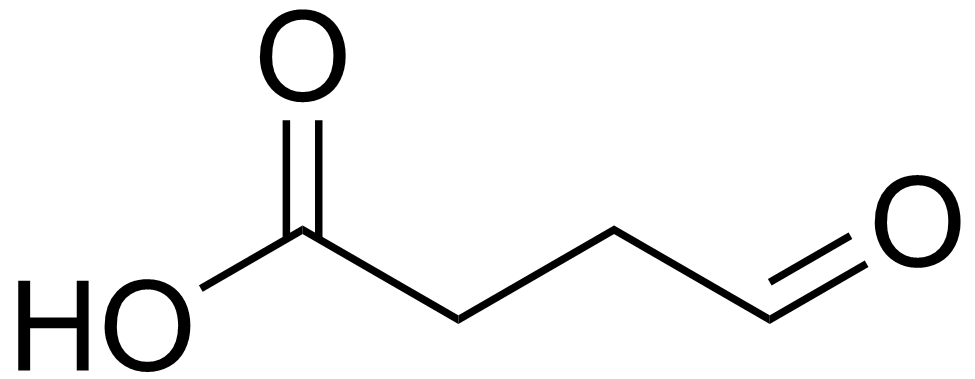
succinic semialdehyde
+ NADP^{+}
H_{2}O
H^{+}
H_{2}O
H^{+}
succinic acid
+ NADPH

This enzyme participates in the degradation of glutamate and 4-aminobutyrate.
