= Biosynthesis of cocaine =

Chemical reactions forming cocaine

Chemical structure of cocaine

The biosynthesis of cocaine is the natural metabolic process by which the coca plant (Erythroxylum species) produces cocaine, a tropane alkaloid, through a multi-step enzymatically catalyzed pathway beginning with ornithine or arginine and culminating in the formation of the cocaine metabolite benzoylecgonine.

The biosynthesis of cocaine has long attracted the attention of biochemists and organic chemists. This interest is partly motivated by the strong physiological effects of cocaine, but a further incentive was the unusual bicyclic structure of the molecule. The biosynthesis can be viewed as occurring in two phases, one phase leading to the N-methylpyrrolinium ring, which is preserved in the final product. The second phase incorporates a C4 unit with formation of the bicyclic tropane core.

== N-methyl-pyrrolinium cation ==
The biosynthesis begins with L-Glutamine, which is derived to L-ornithine in plants. The major contribution of L-ornithine and L-arginine as a precursor to the tropane ring was confirmed by Edward Leete. Ornithine then undergoes a pyridoxal phosphate (PLP)-dependent decarboxylation to form putrescine. In some animals, the urea cycle derives putrescine from ornithine. L-ornithine is converted to L-arginine, which is then decarboxylated via PLP to form agmatine. Hydrolysis of the imine derives N-carbamoylputrescine followed with hydrolysis of the urea to form putrescine. The separate pathways of converting ornithine to putrescine in plants and animals have converged. A SAM-dependent N-methylation of putrescine gives the N-methylputrescine product, which then undergoes oxidative deamination by the action of diamine oxidase to yield the aminoaldehyde. Schiff base formation confirms the biosynthesis of the N-methyl-Δ^{1}-pyrrolinium cation.

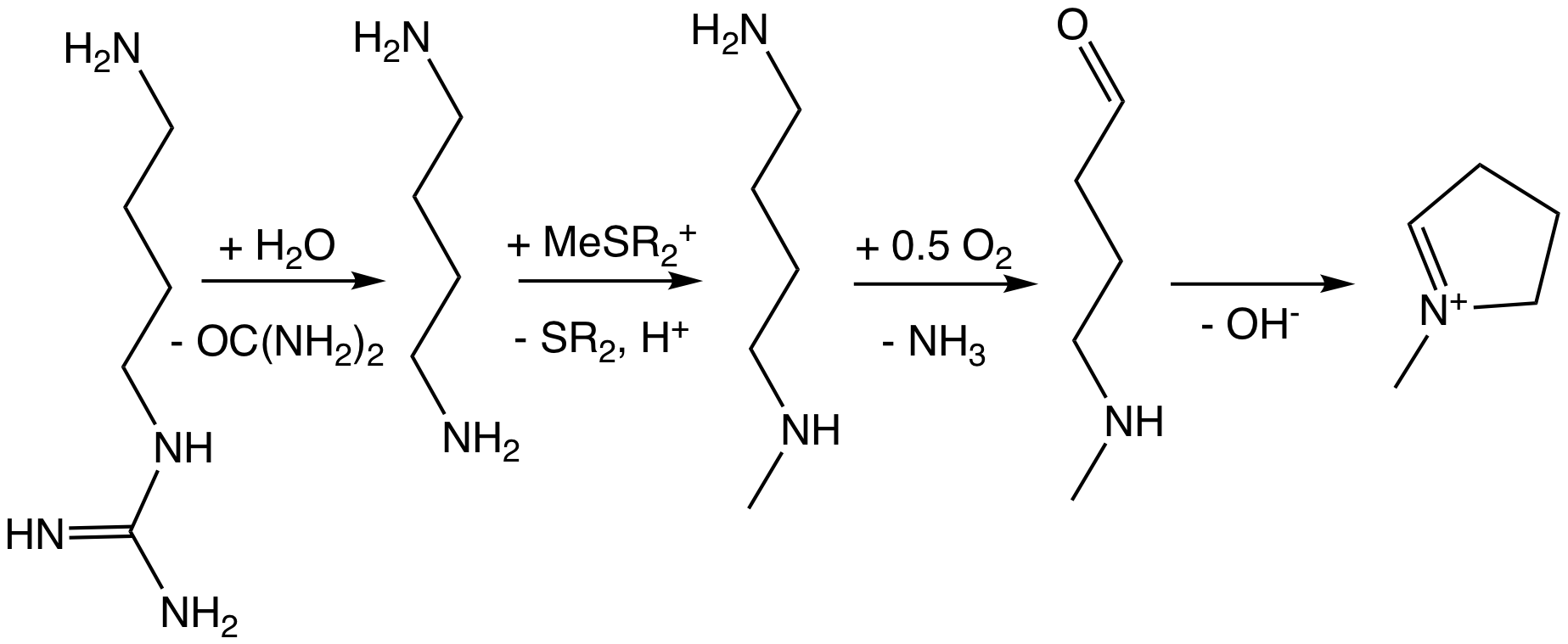
Biosynthesis of N-methyl-pyrrolinium cation. MeSR_{2}^{+} refers to the methylating agent S-adenosyl methionine.

Beyond its role in cocaine, the N-methyl-pyrrolinium cation is a precursor to nicotine, hygrine, cuscohygrine, and other natural products.

=== Reduction of tropinone ===
The additional carbon atoms required for the synthesis of cocaine are derived from acetyl-CoA, by addition of two acetyl-CoA units to the N-methyl-Δ^{1}-pyrrolinium cation. The first addition is a Mannich-like reaction with the enolate anion from acetyl-CoA acting as a nucleophile towards the pyrrolinium cation. The second addition occurs through a Claisen condensation. This produces a racemic mixture of the 2-substituted pyrrolidine, with the retention of the thioester from the Claisen condensation. In formation of tropinone from racemic ethyl [2,3-13C2]4(Nmethyl- 2-pyrrolidinyl)-3-oxobutanoate there is no preference for either stereoisomer.

In the biosynthesis of cocaine, however, only the (S)-enantiomer can cyclize to form the tropane ring system of cocaine. The stereoselectivity of this reaction was further investigated through study of prochiral methylene hydrogen discrimination. This is due to the extra chiral center at C-2. This process occurs through an oxidation, which regenerates the pyrrolinium cation and formation of an enolate anion, and an intramolecular Mannich reaction. The tropane ring system undergoes hydrolysis, SAM-dependent methylation, and reduction via NADPH for the formation of methylecgonine. The reduction of tropinone is mediated by NADPH-dependent reductase enzymes, which have been characterized in multiple plant species. These plant species all contain two types of the reductase enzymes, tropinone reductase I and tropinone reductase II. TRI produces tropine and TRII produces pseudotropine. Due to differing kinetic and pH/activity characteristics of the enzymes and by the 25-fold higher activity of TRI over TRII, the majority of the tropinone reduction is from TRI to form tropine. The benzoyl moiety required for the formation of the cocaine diester is synthesized from phenylalanine via cinnamic acid. Benzoyl-CoA then combines the two units to form cocaine.

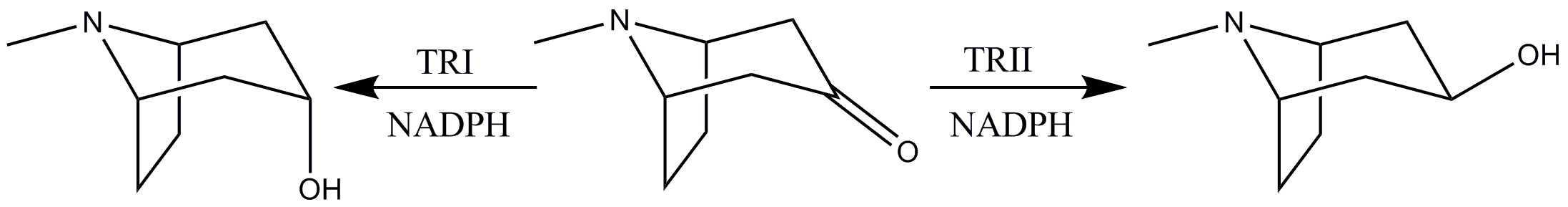
Reduction of tropinone

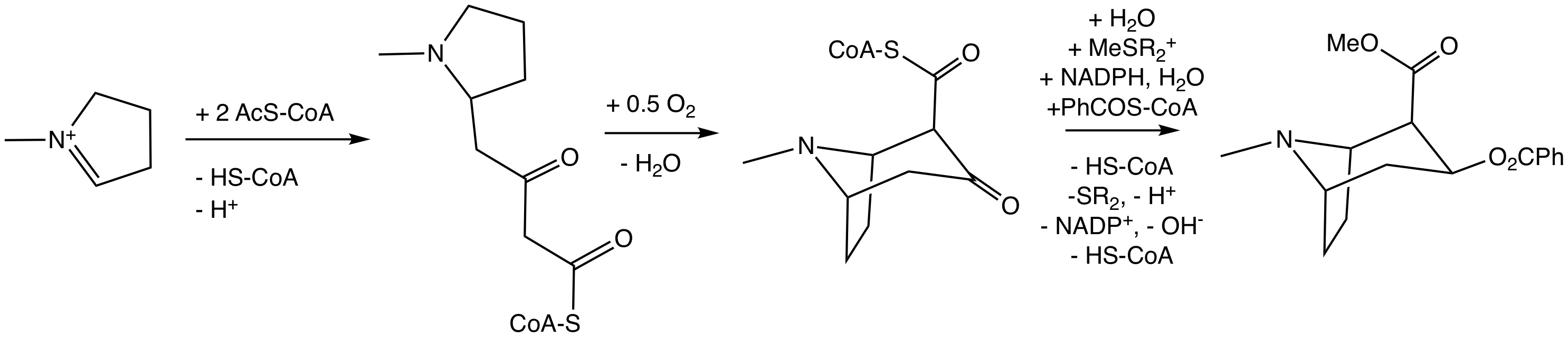
Cocaine biosynthesis from the pyrrolium cation intermediate. MeSR_{2}^{+} refers to the methylating agent S-adenosyl methionine.

== Robert Robinson's acetonedicarboxylate ==
The biosynthesis of the tropane alkaloid is still not understood. Hemscheidt proposes that Robinson's acetonedicarboxylate emerges as a potential intermediate for this reaction. Condensation of N-methylpyrrolinium and acetonedicarboxylate would generate the oxobutyrate. Decarboxylation leads to tropane alkaloid formation.

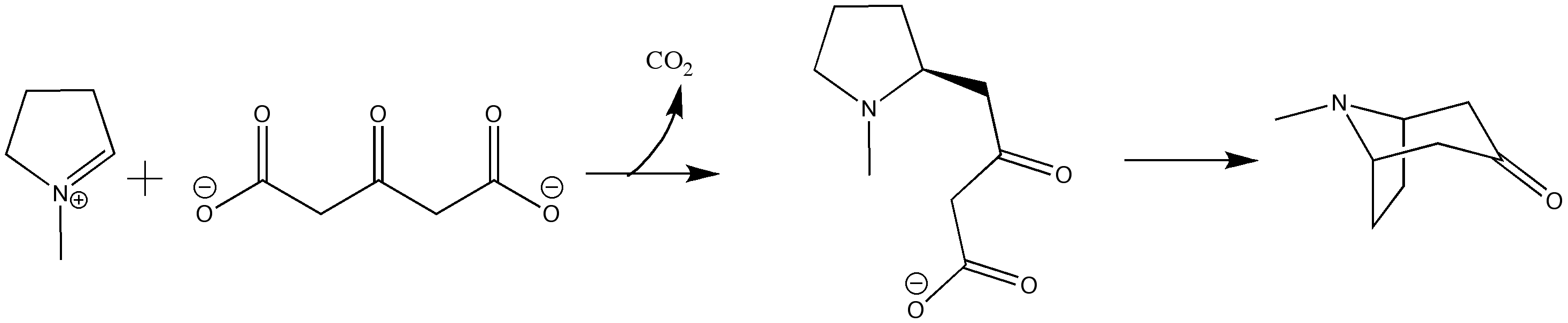
Robinson biosynthesis of tropane

== Structure elucidation and total synthesis ==
In 1898, using classical methods of chemical degradation and derivatization, Richard Willstätter successfully elucidated the chemical structure of cocaine and subsequently achieved its total synthesis. His synthetic route involved the construction of the cocaine molecule from simpler precursors, including tropinone. Significant subsequent contributions to the understanding and synthesis of cocaine were made by Robert Robinson and Edward Leete.
