= C11H19N3O6 =

The molecular formula C_{11}H_{19}N_{3}O_{6} (molar mass: 289.285 g/mol) may refer to:

- Ophthalmic acid
- Tabtoxin, or wildfire toxin
