= 2-ethylmalate synthase =

Class of enzymes

Identifiers
- EC no.: 2.3.3.6
- CAS no.: 9024-01-5

Databases
- IntEnz: IntEnz view
- BRENDA: BRENDA entry
- ExPASy: NiceZyme view
- KEGG: KEGG entry
- MetaCyc: metabolic pathway
- PRIAM: profile
- PDB structures: RCSB PDB PDBe PDBsum
- Gene Ontology: AmiGO / QuickGO
Search
- PMC: articles
- PubMed: articles
- NCBI: proteins

2-ethylmalate synthase (EC 2.3.3.6) is an enzyme that catalyzes the chemical reaction

α-Ketobutyric acid
+
Acetyl-CoA
H_{2}O
(R)-2-ethylmalic acid
+ Coenzyme A

The three substrates of this enzyme characterised from Saccharomyces cerevisiae are α-ketobutyric acid, acetyl-CoA, and water. Its products are (R)-2-ethylmalic acid and coenzyme A.

This enzyme belongs to the family of transferases, specifically those acyltransferases that convert acyl groups into alkyl groups on transfer. The systematic name of this enzyme class is acetyl-CoA:2-oxobutanoate C-acetyltransferase (thioester-hydrolysing, carboxymethyl-forming). Other names in common use include (R)-2-ethylmalate 2-oxobutanoyl-lyase (CoA-acetylating), 2-ethylmalate-3-hydroxybutanedioate synthase, propylmalate synthase, and propylmalic synthase.
