= Β-Aminobutyric acid =

β-Aminobutyric acid

Names
- IUPAC name 3-Aminobutanoic acid
- Other names 3-Aminobutyric acid β-Aminobutanoic acid Carbocreatine; 3-Azaniumylbutanoate; 3-Methyl-β-alanine β-Methyl-β-alanine

Identifiers
CAS Number	541-48-0; 3775-73-3 (R); 3775-72-2 (S)
3D model (JSmol)	Interactive image
ChemSpider	10469
ECHA InfoCard	100.007.986
PubChem CID	10932
UNII	4282SA5CTS
CompTox Dashboard (EPA)	DTXSID4040975
- InChI: InChI=1S/C4H9NO2/c1-3(5)2-4(6)7/h3H,2,5H2,1H3,(H,6,7) Key: OQEBBZSWEGYTPG-UHFFFAOYSA-N; InChI=1/C4H9NO2/c1-3(5)2-4(6)7/h3H,2,5H2,1H3,(H,6,7) Key: OQEBBZSWEGYTPG-UHFFFAOYAG
- SMILES: O=C(O)CC(N)C

Properties
Chemical formula	C_{4}H_{9}NO_{2}
Molar mass	103.121 g·mol^{−1}
- Except where otherwise noted, data are given for materials in their standard state (at 25 °C [77 °F], 100 kPa). Infobox references

β-Aminobutyric acid (BABA) is an isomer of the amino acid aminobutyric acid with the chemical formula C_{4}H_{9}NO_{2}. It has two isomers, α-aminobutyric acid and γ-aminobutyric acid (GABA), a neurotransmitter in animals that is also found in plants, where it may play a role in signalling. All three are non-proteinogenic amino acids, not being found in proteins. BABA is known for its ability to induce plant disease resistance, as well as increased resistance to abiotic stresses, when applied to plants.

== Synthesis ==
Methods to synthesise BABA are known from at least 1857. Early methods to produce BABA included from ammonia and crotonic acid under pressure; from the acetoacetic ester phenylhydrazone; or from malonic acid, acetaldehyde, and ammonia. In 1957, Zilkha reported a new simpler method based on adding amines to crotonic acid and then catalytically hydrogenolysing the product to produce BABA. Since 2000, methods to produce only the S stereoisomer of BABA have also been reported.

== Plant disease resistance ==
BABA was first found to increase the resistance of plants to disease in 1960, when it was observed that it decreased late blight of tomato. Further tests were made in the 1960s, but it was not until the 1990s that interest in the compound was renewed. Since then, it has been shown to be effective in many different pathosystems under controlled conditions. Both perennial and annual plants have been shown to respond, as well as both monocot and dicot plants in the Solanaceae, Cucurbitaceae, Compositae, Fabaceae, Brassicaceae, Graminae, Malvaceae, Rosaceae, and Vitaceae families. Pathogen groups that have shown a response include viruses, bacteria, nematodes, fungi and oomycetes. It has also been shown to be effective in the field at protecting potato and tomato plants from late blight, grape vines from Plasmopara viticola and melons from Monosporascus cannonballus.

Rather than having a direct effect on plant pathogens, it activates plant immune systems enabling them to resist infection more effectively. The effects that it has been studied extensively using the model plant Arabidopsis thaliana.

=== Mode of action ===
BABA induces defense responses in plants by both physical and biochemical means. The precise mechanism depends on the plant and pathogen species (the pathosystem). It is unknown how BABA interacts with plant tissues to increase disease resistance. It does not directly activate defensive genes in isolation, but in combination with an infection, BABA treated plants respond more quickly and strongly to the pathogen.

In some pathosystems, enhanced callose and lignin deposition is seen around the point of infection, which act as a physical barrier preventing disease. Pathogenesis-related proteins (PR proteins) which perform many different functions that help to prevent disease accumulate in some BABA treated plants, regardless of whether they are inoculated with a pathogen or not. If infected however, the level of PR proteins tends to increase further. PR proteins are not the only mechanism of preventing infection however, as soil drenches of BABA that do not induce PR protein production, still confer resistance. This may be due to differences between plant families, as the Solanaceae (potato, tomato, pepper) respond by producing PR proteins without any pathogen present, whereas crucifers (Arabidopsis, cauliflower) require a pathogen to induce PR proteins. In other pathosystems, phytoalexins (anti-microbial compounds) accumulate to higher levels in BABA treated plants when they are infected by pathogens, but not when the pathogen is not present. Foliar sprays of BABA can cause small necrotic spots to form on leaves 1 or 2 days after application. This has been suggested to be due to BABA inducing the hypersensitive response which plants normally use to kill infected cells to limit the spread of infection.

BABA applied as a foliar spray causes the plant hormone salicylic acid (SA) to accumulate, which is a key hormone in controlling systemic acquired resistance (SAR). Genetically modified tobacco plants that are unable to accumulate SA are still protected by BABA against some pathogens, but not others, indicating pathosystem-specific mechanisms by which BABA confers resistance. Arabidopsis unable to produce SA, jasmonic acid or ethylene (other hormones involved in defence) were still protected from the oomycete Peronospora parasitica but plants unable to produce SA were susceptible to the bacteria Pseudomonas syringae. This variation in the hormones required for BABA to confer resistance makes it differ from other synthetic activators of plant defence, which only operate through the SAR pathway of PR proteins.
