= Bacterial glutathione transferase =

Beta class glutathione transferase structure from Proteus mirabilis (PDB: 1PMT).

Bacterial glutathione transferases (GSTs; EC 2.5.1.18) are part of a superfamily of enzymes that play a crucial role in cellular detoxification, including drugs. The primary role of GSTs is to catalyze the conjugation of glutathione (GSH) with the electrophilic centers of a wide variety of molecules. The most commonly known substrates of GSTs are xenobiotic synthetic chemicals. There are also classes of GSTs that utilize glutathione as a cofactor rather than a substrate. Often these GSTs are involved in reduction of reactive oxidative species toxic to the bacterium. Conjugation with glutathione receptors renders toxic substances more soluble, and therefore more readily exocytosed from the cell.

== Classes and roles ==
Bacterial glutathione transferases are widely distributed in aerobic bacteria and are classified into several classes. These classes are organized according to the protein sequence and structure. In bacteria, the theta class GSTs includes all of the currently known bacterial glutathione transferases. Between classes, these proteins have less than 25% sequence identity, while members of the same class match about 40% amino acid sequence identity. In comparison to eukaryotes, studies have shown that most of the residues that are highly conserved in theta and other bacterial class GSTs are not retained in those of the alpha, mu, and pi classes of eukaryotic GSTs. The considerable amount of protein sequence variation has led to the general belief that GSTs carry out a very wide variety of glutathione-dependent conjugation functions. No other currently known proteins have the same overall topology as GST enzymes.

Bacterial glutathione transferases are not detected in anaerobic bacteria or archaea. These antioxidant enzymes are a part of the glutathione biosynthetic pathway, which is present in cyanobacteria, proteobacteria, and certain Gram-negative bacteria.

Bacterial GSTs are involved in a variety of distinct processes such as biotransformation of toxic compounds, protection against several stresses, and antibacterial drug resistance. GSTs also have important roles in metabolism, such as signaling-ligand biosynthesis, tyrosine depredation, peroxide breakdown, and dehydroascorbate reduction.

== Glutathione ==
As the key substrate in GST-mediated reactions, glutathione is one of the most conserved reducing agents in bacterial cells. In its reduced form, glutathione plays a key role in the regulation of reactive oxygen species (ROS) in the cell. ROS are specific to aerobic cells and are usually produced in their metabolic processes. They function to maintain a dynamic balance under normal conditions, acting as intracellular and extracellular signaling molecules. The regulation of levels of ROS, levels of oxidized and reduced glutathione and other thiols, and antioxidant enzymes (such as GSTs and glutathione reductase) are important in determination of the most stable conditions for redox control, or for activation of apoptosis. Glutathione reductase is another enzyme that helps maintain cellular redox homeostasis by maintaining the supply of reduced glutathione. Without glutathione in its reduced form, glutathione transferases are not able to utilize it as a substrate in redox reactions.

Glutathione contains a significant amount of cysteine residues, which contributes to its nature of being readily oxidized. The -SH groups on these residues act as strong nucleophiles, which can conjugate with a variety of molecules, including other glutathione molecules. Sulfur itself is able to exist in several different oxidation states; this redox flexibility combined with its strong nucleophilic properties allows glutathione to oxidize/readily pick up electrons from reactive oxygen species. Glutathione transferases play a key role in catalyzing such reactions.

== Structure ==
Bacterial glutathione transferases of all classes are homodimeric enzymes (although heterodimeric isozymes of certain classes are also known). Monomers fold into a two-domain configuration to form the active enzyme structure. These globular proteins have an N-terminal domain that consists of a mixture of alpha-helices and beta strands, while the C-terminal domain is all-helical.

The N-terminal domain contains the glutathione-binding site and is a highly conserved region among all GSTs. This domain has a similar composition to thioredoxins, which act as antioxidants by facilitating the reduction of other proteins. In comparison, the region that contains the greatest amount of variability between GST classes is contained in the alpha-2 helix on the C-terminal domain. The predominantly alpha-helical C-terminal domain is involved with the binding of hydrophobic substrates (such as hydrophobic portions of xenobiotics). The specificity of the alpha-2 helix stems from the assortment of amino acids in the domain that interacts with the glycine residue of glutathione.

== Functions ==
Bacterial glutathione transferases are specific to aerobic bacteria and mainly function in the detoxification of exogenous compounds and the relief of oxidative stress.

== Role in protection against oxidative stress ==
Aerobic bacteria inevitably are prone to the formation of reactive oxygen species due to the nature of their respiration processes. Under normal conditions these ROS strive to maintain a dynamic balance; however, this balance can often be disrupted by biotic or abiotic stressors such as superoxide radicals, endogenous lipids, DNA hydroperoxides, hydrogen peroxide, hydroxyl radicals, and hydroxy alkenals. Therefore, these susceptible organisms have intrinsic mechanisms to protect from oxidative damage; glutathione plays a key role in most of these antioxidant mechanisms.

Once reduced, glutathione interacts with these reactive oxygen and nitrogen species. This interaction is catalyzed by GSTs and their involvement is vital for successful oxidation of glutathione. GSTs bind the ROS substrate at its hydrophobic alpha-helical C-terminal domain, as well as reduced glutathione to its glutathione-binding site on the N-terminal domain. These two domains are adjacent to each other on the enzyme, and together form the active site of the GST where the redox reaction occurs. Once both substrates are bound at the enzyme's active site, the monomeric GST interacts with another substrate-bound GST monomer and catalyzes a disulphide bridge between the two glutathione molecules. This yields the active dimeric enzyme structure. The reactive oxygen species then donates one electron to a glutathione molecule, completing the oxidation-reduction reaction and rendering it unable to perform oxidative damage to the cell.

After completion of this reaction, glutathione reductase recycles oxidized glutathione back to the reduced form so that it again can be picked up by GSTs. This glutathione system acts as the major reduction-oxidation buffer in aerobic bacterial cells, contributing to the overall reduced cellular environment of the cytosol.

== Role in detoxification of xenobiotic substances ==
One of the primary roles of bacterial glutathione transferases is to reduce the toxic effects of xenobiotics from the cell using the phase II system of detoxification metabolism. Xenobiotics are compounds foreign to the bacterium's natural biochemistry, and phase II of their detoxification involves conjugating them to polar, soluble compounds that can be safely excreted from the cell.

GSTs are essential in this process because they catalyze the nucleophilic attack of glutathione on various electrophilic residues of xenobiotic substrates, thereby preventing their disruption of vital cellular proteins and nucleic acids. Similar to the mechanism GSTs use for catalyzation of redox reactions, the mechanism for detoxification first involves the binding of two substrates to the enzyme. A GST monomer binds a glutathione molecule to its N-terminal glutathione-binding site. On the adjacent hydrophobic alpha-helical binding site on the C-terminal domain, the GST binds a hydrophobic xenobiotic molecule. Formation of the active site recruits another GST monomer to interact with the system and the enzymes dimerize. The active GST complex catalyzes the -SH residue on glutathione to perform a nucleophilic attack on electrophilic carbon, sulfur, or nitrogen atoms of the xenobiotic substrate. The conjugation of glutathione on the previously hydrophobic-toxic substrate results in a soluble compound, which is more readily exocytosed by the cell.

== See also ==
- Glutathione
