= Glutathione =

Ubiquitous antioxidant compound in living organisms

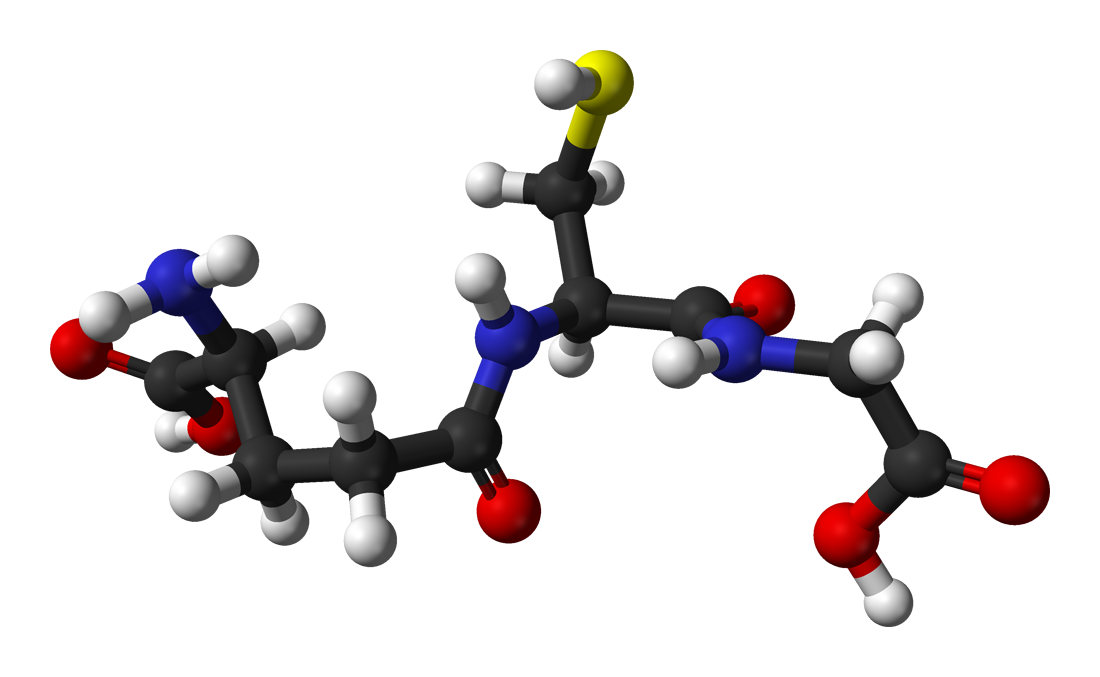

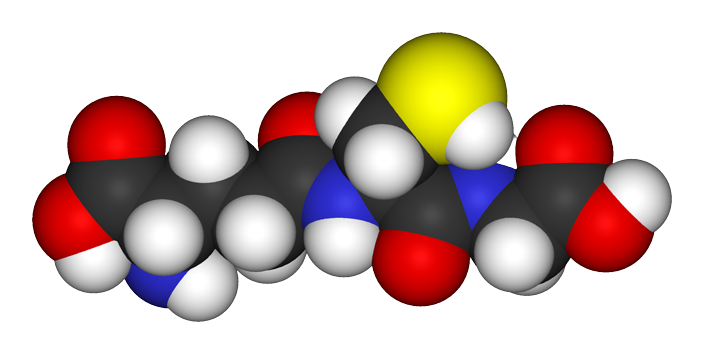

Names
- IUPAC name γ-Glutamylcysteinylglycine
- Systematic IUPAC name (2S)-2-Amino-5-({(2R)-1-[(carboxymethyl)amino]-1-oxo-3-sulfanylpropan-2-yl}amino)-5-oxopentanoic acid
- Other names γ-L-Glutamyl-L-cysteinylglycine (2S)-2-Amino-4-({(1R)-1-[(carboxymethyl)carbamoyl]-2-sulfanylethyl}carbamoyl)butanoic acid

Identifiers
CAS Number	70-18-8
3D model (JSmol)	Interactive image
Abbreviations	GSH
ChEBI	CHEBI:16856
ChEMBL	ChEMBL1543
ChemSpider	111188
DrugBank	DB00143
ECHA InfoCard	100.000.660
IUPHAR/BPS	6737
KEGG	C00051
MeSH	Glutathione
PubChem CID	124886
UNII	GAN16C9B8O
CompTox Dashboard (EPA)	DTXSID6023101
- InChI: InChI=1S/C10H17N3O6S/c11-5(10(18)19)1-2-7(14)13-6(4-20)9(17)12-3-8(15)16/h5-6,20H,1-4,11H2,(H,12,17)(H,13,14)(H,15,16)(H,18,19)/t5-,6-/m0/s1 Key: RWSXRVCMGQZWBV-WDSKDSINSA-N
- SMILES: C(CC(=O)N[C@@H](CS)C(=O)NCC(=O)O)[C@@H](C(=O)O)N

Properties
Chemical formula	C_{10}H_{17}N_{3}O_{6}S
Molar mass	307.32 g·mol^{−1}
Melting point	195 °C (383 °F; 468 K)
Solubility in water	Freely soluble
Solubility in methanol, diethyl ether	Insoluble

Pharmacology
ATC code	V03AB32 (WHO)
- Except where otherwise noted, data are given for materials in their standard state (at 25 °C [77 °F], 100 kPa). verify (what is ?) Infobox references

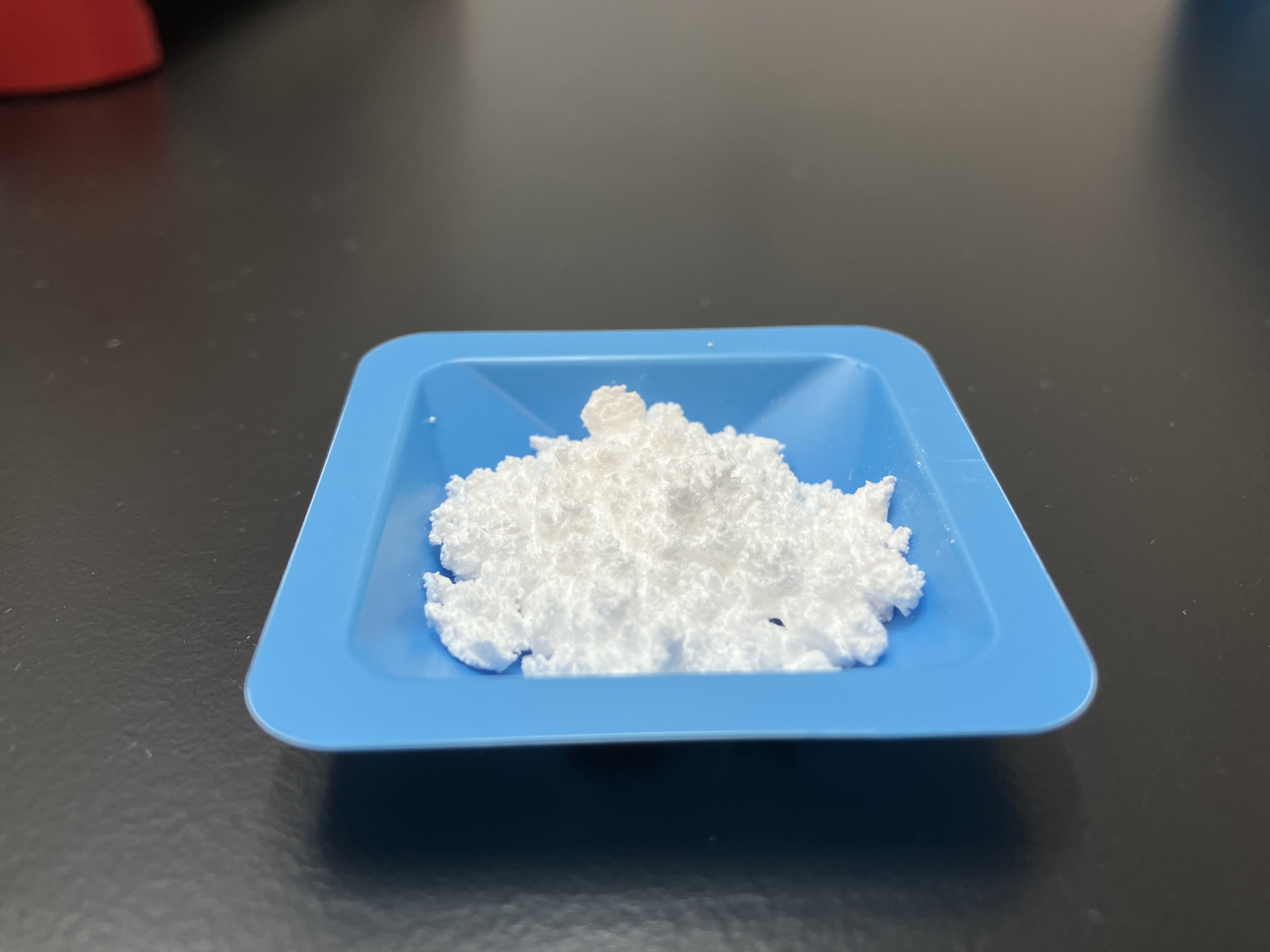
Glutathione (GSH) powder

Glutathione (GSH, /ˌɡluːtəˈθaɪoʊn/) is a tripeptide made of the amino acids glutamate, cysteine, and glycine. It is an antioxidant in plants, animals, fungi, and some bacteria and archaea. Glutathione is capable of preventing damage to important cellular components caused by sources such as reactive oxygen species, free radicals, peroxides, lipid peroxides, and heavy metals. It is the most abundant and important low-molecular-mass thiol within most cell types.

It is synthesized by attaching cysteine to the carboxyl group of the glutamate side chain with a gamma peptide linkage, and to glycine with a normal peptide bond.

== Notation ==
In GSH, G stands for glutathione as a whole molecule, is not the one-letter amino-acid code for glycine. So GSH means: G–SH = glutathione with a free thiol group.

Glutathione as a tripeptide is γ-Glu–Cys–Gly, or in one-letter residue notation γ-ECG.

It oxidizes into glutathione disulfide (GSSG), where the SS denotes the disulfide bond between two glutathiones.

== Biosynthesis and occurrence ==
Glutathione biosynthesis involves two adenosine triphosphate-dependent steps:

- First, γ-glutamylcysteine is synthesized from L-glutamate and L-cysteine. This conversion requires the enzyme glutamate–cysteine ligase (GCL, glutamate-cysteine synthase). This reaction is the rate-limiting step in glutathione synthesis.
- Second, glycine is added to the C-terminal of γ-glutamylcysteine. This condensation is catalyzed by glutathione synthetase.

While all animal cells are capable of synthesizing glutathione, synthesis in the liver is essential. GCLC knockout mice die within a month of birth due to the absence of hepatic GSH synthesis.

The unusual gamma amide linkage in glutathione protects it from hydrolysis by peptidases.

=== Occurrence ===
Glutathione is the most abundant non-protein thiol (R−SH-containing compound) in animal cells, ranging from 0.5 to 10 mmol/L. It is present in the cytosol and organelles. The concentration of glutathione in the cytoplasm is significantly higher (ranging from 0.5-10 mM) compared to extracellular fluids (2-20 μM), reaching levels up to 1000 times greater. In healthy cells and tissue, more than 90% of the total glutathione pool is in the reduced form (GSH), with the remainder in the disulfide form (GSSG). The cytosol holds 80-85% of cellular GSH, and the mitochondria hold 10-15%.

Human beings synthesize glutathione, but a few eukaryotes do not, including some members of Fabaceae, Entamoeba, and Giardia. The only known archaea that make glutathione are halobacteria. Some bacteria, such as "Cyanobacteria" and Pseudomonadota, can biosynthesize glutathione.

The systemic availability of orally administered glutathione is poor. It has low bioavailability because the tripeptide is the substrate of proteases (peptidases) of the alimentary canal, and due to the absence of a specific carrier of glutathione at the level of the cell membrane. The administration of N-acetylcysteine (NAC), a cysteine prodrug, helps replenish intracellular GSH levels.

== Biochemical function ==
Glutathione exists in reduced (GSH) and oxidized (GSSG) states. The ratio of reduced glutathione to oxidized glutathione within cells is a measure of cellular oxidative stress where increased GSSG-to-GSH ratio is indicative of greater oxidative stress.

In the reduced state, the thiol group of cysteinyl residue is a source of one reducing equivalent. Glutathione disulfide (GSSG) is thereby generated. The oxidized state is converted to the reduced state by NADPH. This conversion is catalyzed by glutathione reductase:

NADPH + GSSG + H_{2}O → 2 GSH + NADP^{+} + OH^{−}

== Roles ==
=== Antioxidant ===
GSH protects cells by quenching (reducing) reactive oxygen species. This conversion is illustrated by the reduction of peroxides (via the sulfenate as an intermediate):

GSH + R_{2}O_{2} → GS–OR + ROH
GS–OR + GSH → GSSG + ROH
Net reaction: 2 GSH + R_{2}O_{2} → GSSG + 2 ROH (R = H, alkyl)

and with free radicals, forming glutathionyl radicals (GS^{•}) that may dimerize to disulfide:

GSH + R^{•} → RH + GS^{•} → 1/2 GSSG

Thiyl radicals (such as glutathionyl radicals) are themselves oxidizing species in biology, with a single-electron reduction potential sufficient for oxidation of nucleic acids, proteins and polyunsaturated lipids. Therefore, GSH itself may not be effective at direct reduction of reactive oxygen species under physiological conditions. Under oxidizing conditions, hydrogen sulfide may react with glutathione (or other electrophilic oxidized forms of glutathione) to form glutathione hydropersulfide (GS–SH), which is a superior radical-trapping antioxidant and reductant.

GSH is a highly important indirect antioxidant by acting as a coenzyme for various enzymes that couple GSH-to-GSSG oxidation to the reduction of harmful oxidizing species. Such enzymes include the glutathione peroxidase family, the glutaredoxin family, the peroxiredoxin family, and others.

=== Regulation ===
Aside from deactivating radicals and reactive oxidants, glutathione participates in thiol protection and redox regulation of cellular thiol proteins under oxidative stress by protein S-glutathionylation, a redox-regulated post-translational thiol modification. The general reaction involves formation of an unsymmetrical disulfide from the protectable protein (RSH) and GSH:

RSH + GSH + [O] → GSSR + H_{2}O

Glutathione is also employed for the detoxification of methylglyoxal and formaldehyde, toxic metabolites produced under oxidative stress. This detoxification reaction is carried out by the glyoxalase system. Glyoxalase I (EC 4.4.1.5) catalyzes the conversion of methylglyoxal and reduced glutathione to S-D-lactoylglutathione. Glyoxalase II (EC 3.1.2.6) catalyzes the hydrolysis of S-D-lactoylglutathione to glutathione and D-lactic acid.

It maintains exogenous antioxidants such as vitamins C and E in their reduced (active) states.

=== Metabolism ===
Among the many metabolic processes in which it participates, glutathione is required for the biosynthesis of leukotrienes and prostaglandins. It plays a role in cysteine storage. Glutathione enhances the function of citrulline as part of the nitric oxide cycle. It is a cofactor and acts on glutathione peroxidase.

Glutathione facilitates metabolism of xenobiotics. Glutathione S-transferase enzymes catalyze its conjugation to lipophilic xenobiotics, facilitating their excretion or further metabolism. The conjugation process is illustrated by the metabolism of N-acetyl-p-benzoquinone imine (NAPQI). NAPQI is a reactive metabolite formed by the action of cytochrome P450 on paracetamol (acetaminophen). Glutathione conjugates to NAPQI, and the resulting ensemble is excreted. As a result of this reaction, cellular glutathione concentration tends to be depleted in the presence of acetaminophen.

=== In plants ===
In plants, glutathione plays a role in stress response. It is a component of the glutathione-ascorbate cycle, a system that reduces poisonous hydrogen peroxide. It is the precursor of phytochelatins, glutathione oligomers that chelate heavy metals such as cadmium. Glutathione is required for efficient defense against plant pathogens such as Pseudomonas syringae and Phytophthora brassicae. Adenylyl-sulfate reductase, an enzyme of the sulfur assimilation pathway, uses glutathione as an electron donor. Other enzymes using glutathione as a substrate are glutaredoxins. These small oxidoreductases are involved in flower development, salicylic acid, and plant defense signalling.

== In degradation of drug delivery systems ==
Among various types of cancer, lung cancer, larynx cancer, mouth cancer, and breast cancer exhibit higher concentrations (10-40 mM) of GSH compared to healthy cells. Thus, drug delivery systems containing disulfide bonds, typically cross-linked micro-nanogels, stand out for their ability to degrade in the presence of high concentrations of glutathione (GSH). This degradation process releases the drug payload specifically into cancerous or tumorous tissue, leveraging the significant difference in redox potential between the oxidizing extracellular environment and the reducing intracellular cytosol.

When internalized by endocytosis, nanogels encounter high concentrations of GSH inside the cancer cell. GSH, a potent reducing agent, donates electrons to disulfide bonds in the nanogels, initiating a thiol-disulfide exchange reaction. This reaction breaks the disulfide bonds, converting them into two thiol groups, and facilitates targeted drug release where it is needed most. This reaction is called a thiol-disulfide exchange reaction.

R−S−S−R' + 2 GSH → R−SH + R'−SH + GSSG

where R and R' are parts of the micro-nanogel structure, and GSSG is oxidized glutathione (glutathione disulfide).

The breaking of disulfide bonds causes the nanogel to degrade into smaller fragments. This degradation process leads to the release of encapsulated drugs. The released drug molecules can then exert their therapeutic effects, such as inducing apoptosis in cancer cells.

== Uses ==
=== Winemaking ===
The content of glutathione in must, the first raw form of wine, determines the browning, or caramelizing effect, during the production of white wine by trapping the caffeoyltartaric acid quinones generated by enzymic oxidation as grape reaction product. Its concentration in wine can be determined by UPLC-MRM mass spectrometry.

== See also ==
- Reductive stress
- Glutathione synthetase deficiency
- Ophthalmic acid
- roGFP, a tool to measure the cellular glutathione redox potential
- Glutathione-ascorbate cycle
- Bacterial glutathione transferase
- Thioredoxin, a cysteine-containing small protein with very similar functions to reducing agents
- Glutaredoxin, an antioxidant protein that uses reduced glutathione as a cofactor and is reduced nonenzymatically by it
- Bacillithiol
- Mycothiol
- γ-L-Glutamyl-L-cysteine
