= Α-Aminobutyric acid =

α-Aminobutyric acid
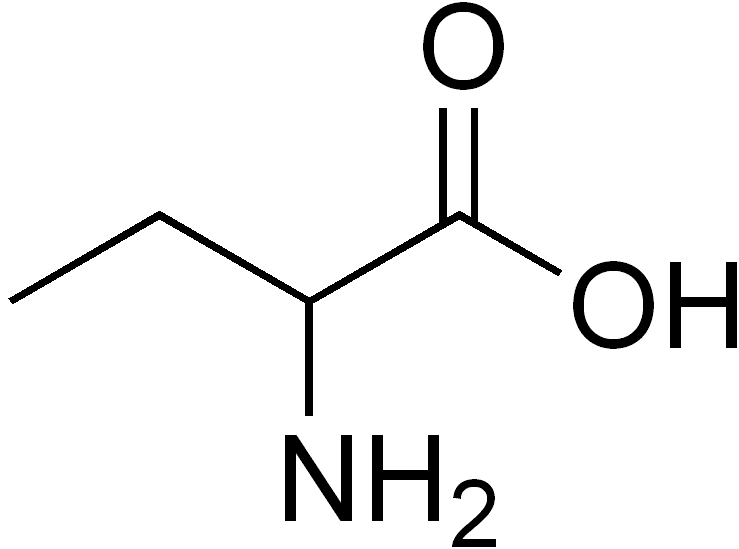

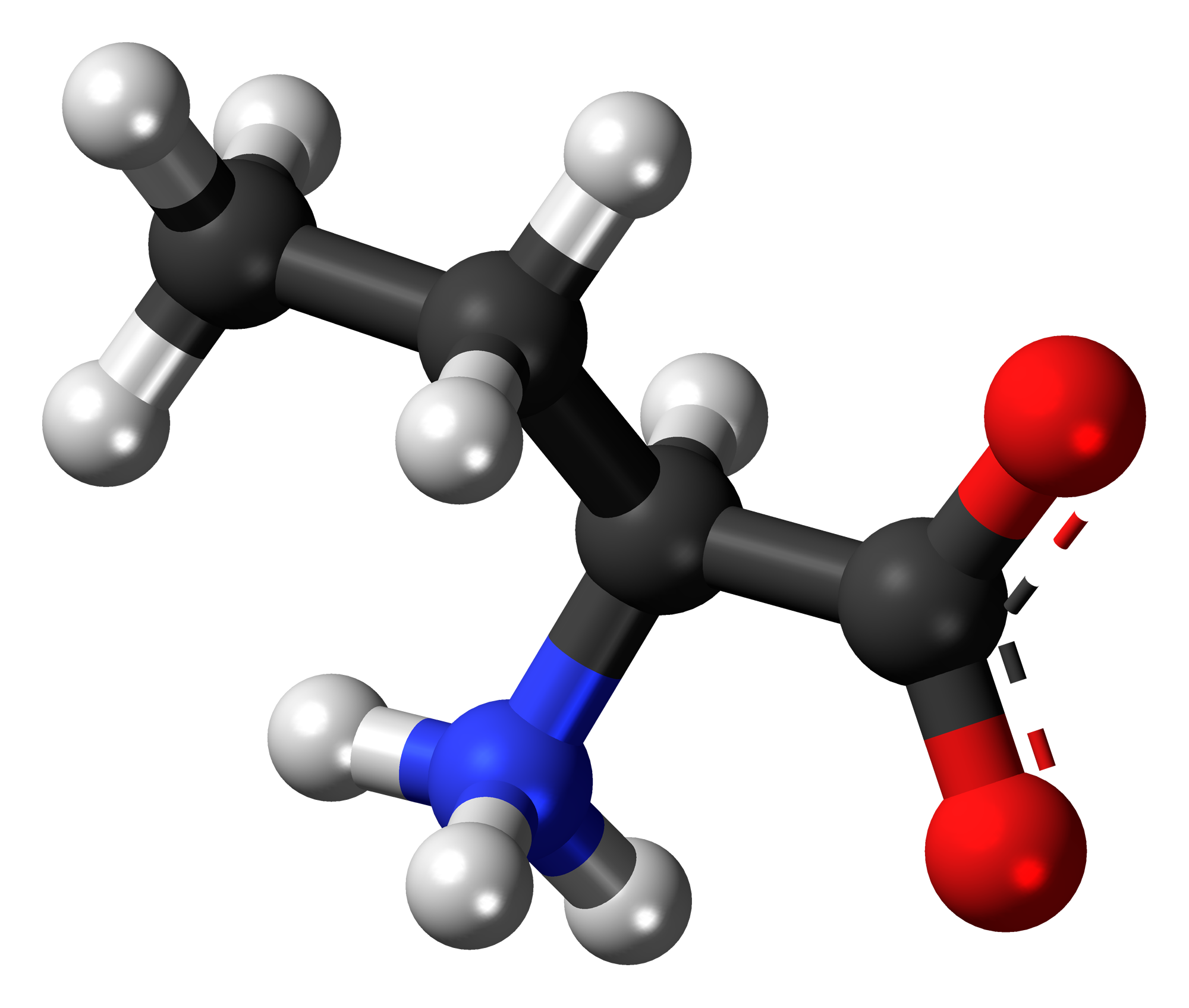

Names
- IUPAC name Homoalanine
- Systematic IUPAC name 2-Aminobutanoic acid
- Other names 2-Aminobutyric acid; α-Aminobutanoic acid; Ethylglycine; 2-Azaniumylbutanoate

Identifiers
CAS Number	2835-81-6
3D model (JSmol)	Interactive image
ChEBI	CHEBI:35621
ChEMBL	ChEMBL55242
ChemSpider	6405
ECHA InfoCard	100.018.742
PubChem CID	6657
UNII	8306QPJ19P
CompTox Dashboard (EPA)	DTXSID90862679
- InChI: InChI=1S/C4H9NO2/c1-2-3(5)4(6)7/h3H,2,5H2,1H3,(H,6,7) Key: QWCKQJZIFLGMSD-UHFFFAOYSA-N; InChI=1/C4H9NO2/c1-2-3(5)4(6)7/h3H,2,5H2,1H3,(H,6,7) Key: QWCKQJZIFLGMSD-UHFFFAOYAG
- SMILES: O=C(O)C(N)CC

Properties
Chemical formula	C_{4}H_{9}NO_{2}
Molar mass	103.121 g·mol^{−1}
Appearance	white solid
Melting point	305 °C (581 °F; 578 K)
Acidity (pK_{a})	2.55 (carboxyl), 9.60 (amino)
Magnetic susceptibility (χ)	−62.1·10^{−6} cm^{3}/mol
- Except where otherwise noted, data are given for materials in their standard state (at 25 °C [77 °F], 100 kPa). verify (what is ?) Infobox references

α-Aminobutyric acid (AABA), also known as homoalanine in biochemistry, is a non-proteinogenic alpha amino acid with chemical formula C_{4}H_{9}NO_{2}. The straight two carbon side chain is one carbon longer than alanine, hence the prefix homo-. The conjugate base of α-aminobutyric acid is the carboxylate α-aminobutyrate.

Homoalanine is biosynthesized by transaminating oxobutyrate, a metabolite in isoleucine biosynthesis. It is used by nonribosomal peptide synthases. One example of a nonribosomal peptide containing homoalanine is ophthalmic acid, which was first isolated from calf lens.

α-Aminobutyric acid is one of the three isomers of aminobutyric acid. The two other are the neurotransmitter γ-aminobutyric acid (GABA) and β-aminobutyric acid (BABA) which is known for inducing plant disease resistance.

This amino acid has been detected in meteorites.
