= Α-Ketobutyric acid =

α-Ketobutyric acid

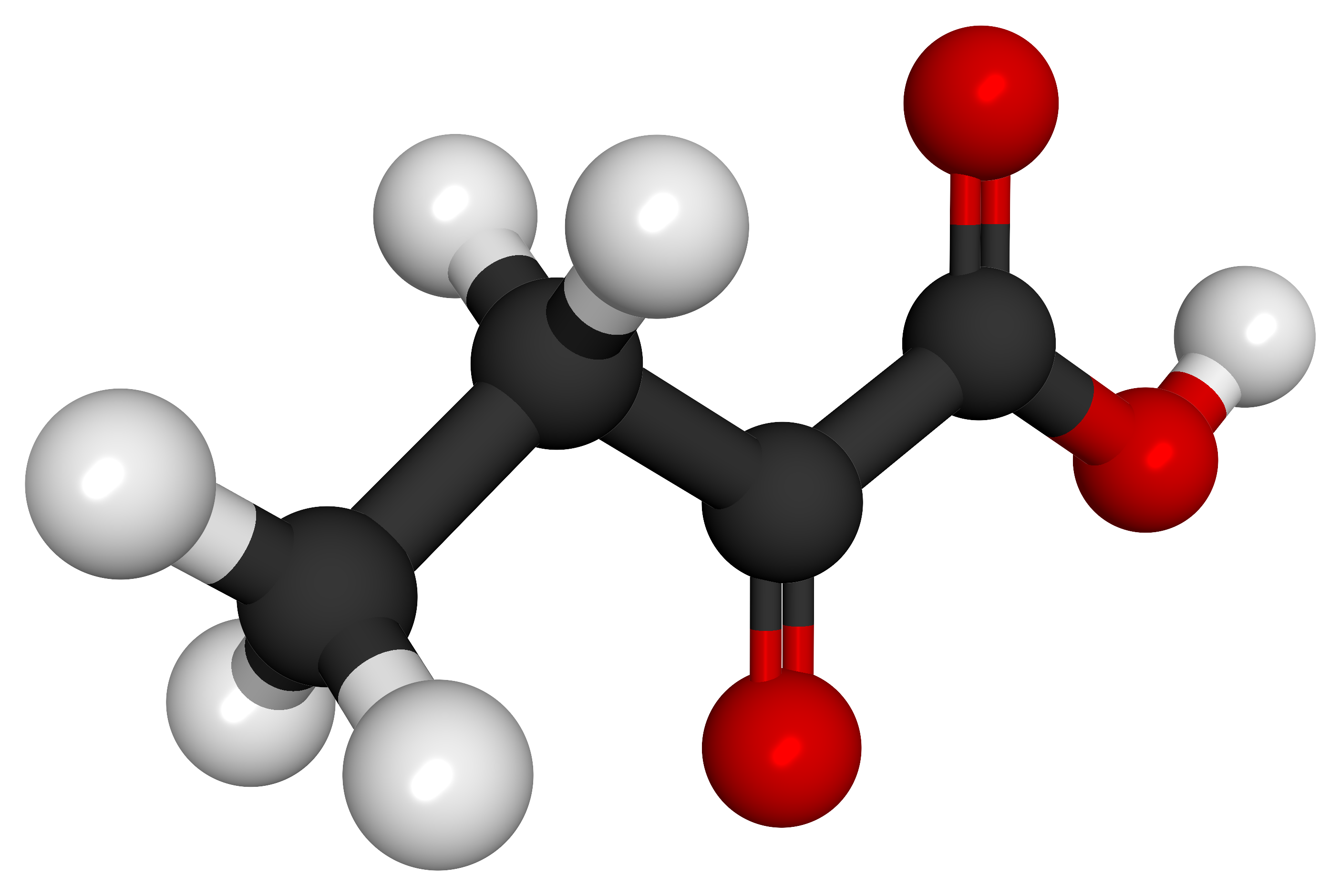

Names
- Preferred IUPAC name 2-Oxobutanoic acid

Identifiers
CAS Number	600-18-0
3D model (JSmol)	Interactive image
ChEBI	CHEBI:30831
ChEMBL	ChEMBL171246
ChemSpider	57
DrugBank	DB04553
ECHA InfoCard	100.009.080
EC Number	209-986-9
KEGG	C00109
MeSH	Alpha-ketobutyric+acid
PubChem CID	58
UNII	B92RB6HY1A
CompTox Dashboard (EPA)	DTXSID9060524
- InChI: InChI=1S/C4H6O3/c1-2-3(5)4(6)7/h2H2,1H3,(H,6,7) Key: TYEYBOSBBBHJIV-UHFFFAOYSA-N; InChI=1/C4H6O3/c1-2-3(5)4(6)7/h2H2,1H3,(H,6,7) Key: TYEYBOSBBBHJIV-UHFFFAOYAT
- SMILES: O=C(C(=O)O)CC

Properties
Chemical formula	C_{4}H_{6}O_{3}
Molar mass	102.089 g/mol
Appearance	colorless solid
Melting point	33 °C (91 °F; 306 K)
- Except where otherwise noted, data are given for materials in their standard state (at 25 °C [77 °F], 100 kPa). verify (what is ?) Infobox references

α-Ketobutyric acid is an organic compound with the formula CH_{3}CH_{2}C(O)CO_{2}H. It is a colorless solid that melts just above room temperature. Its conjugate base α-ketobutyrate is the predominant form found in nature (near neutral pH). It results from the lysis of cystathionine. It is also one of the degradation products of threonine, produced by the catabolism of the amino acid by threonine dehydratase. It is also produced by the degradation of homocysteine and the metabolism of methionine.

It is a precursor to the commercial route to levetiracetam, an anti-epileptic drug, and homoalanine.

α-Ketobutyrate is transported into the mitochondrial matrix, where it is converted to propionyl-CoA by branched-chain alpha-keto acid dehydrogenase complex. Further mitochondrial reactions produce succinyl-CoA. This is first through the enzyme mitochondria propionyl-CoA carboxylase with biotin as a cofactor to produce (S)-methylmalonyl-CoA. This is subsequently converted to (R)-methylmalonyl-CoA by mitochondrial methylmalonyl-CoA epimerase. Finally, mitochondrial methylmalonyl-CoA mutase with cofactor adenosylcobalamin produces succinyl-CoA which enters the citric acid cycle.

== Conversion in sotolon in French vin jaune ==
Vin jaune is marked by the formation of sotolon from alpha-ketobutyric acid.

== See also ==
- Butyric acid
- α-Aminobutyric acid (homoalanine)
- 2-Hydroxybutyric acid (α-hydroxybutyric acid)
- Other oxobutanoic acids
  - 3-Oxobutanoic acid (acetoacetic acid)
  - 4-Oxobutanoic acid (succinic semialdehyde)
