= Glutamate–cysteine ligase =

Enzyme in glutathione biosynthesis

Identifiers
- EC no.: 6.3.2.2
- CAS no.: 9023-64-7

Databases
- BRENDA: enzyme data
- ExPASy: NiceZyme view
- KEGG: enzyme entry
- MetaCyc: metabolic pathway
- Rhea: reactions
- PDB structures: RCSB PDB PDBe PDBsum
- Gene Ontology: AmiGO / QuickGO
Search
- PMC: articles
- PubMed: articles
- NCBI: proteins

Structure of the Glutamate-cysteine ligase

Glutamate–cysteine ligase (GCL) EC 6.3.2.2), previously known as γ-glutamylcysteine synthetase (GCS), is the first enzyme of the cellular glutathione (GSH) biosynthetic pathway that catalyzes the chemical reaction:

L-glutamate + L-cysteine + ATP $\rightleftharpoons$ γ-glutamyl cysteine + ADP + P_{i}

GSH, and by extension GCL, is critical to cell survival. Nearly every eukaryotic cell, from plants to yeast to humans, expresses a form of the GCL protein for the purpose of synthesizing GSH. To further highlight the critical nature of this enzyme, genetic knockout of GCL results in embryonic lethality. Furthermore, dysregulation of GCL enzymatic function and activity is known to be involved in the vast majority of human diseases, such as diabetes, Parkinson's disease, Alzheimer's disease, COPD, HIV/AIDS, and cancer. This typically involves impaired function leading to decreased GSH biosynthesis, reduced cellular antioxidant capacity, and the induction of oxidative stress. However, in cancer, GCL expression and activity is enhanced, which serves to both support the high level of cell proliferation and confer resistance to many chemotherapeutic agents.

== Function ==
Glutamate cysteine ligase (GCL) catalyzes the first and rate-limiting step in the production of the cellular antioxidant glutathione (GSH), involving the ATP-dependent condensation of cysteine and glutamate to form the dipeptide gamma-glutamylcysteine (γ-GC). This peptide coupling is unique in that it occurs between the amino moiety of the cysteine and the terminal carboxylic acid of the glutamate side chain (hence the name gamma-glutamyl cysteine). This peptide bond is resistant to cleavage by cellular peptidases and requires a specialized enzyme, gamma-glutamyl transpeptidase (γGT), to metabolize γ-GC and GSH into its constituent amino acids.

GCL enzymatic activity generally dictates cellular GSH levels and GSH biosynthetic capacity. GCL enzymatic activity is influenced by numerous factors, including cellular expression of the GCL subunit proteins, access to substrates (cysteine is typically limiting in the production of γ-GC), the degree of negative feedback inhibition by GSH, and functionally relevant post-translational modifications to specific sites on the GCL subunits. Given its status as the rate-limiting enzyme in GSH biosynthesis, changes in GCL activity directly equate to changes in cellular GSH biosynthetic capacity. Therefore, therapeutic strategies to alter GSH production have focused on this enzyme.

== Regulation ==
In keeping with its critical importance in maintaining life, GCL is subject to a multi-level regulation of its expression, function, and activity. GCL expression is regulated at the transcriptional (transcription of the GCLC and GCLM DNA to make mRNA), posttranscriptional (the stability of the mRNA over time), translational (processing of the mRNA into protein), and posttranslational levels (involving modifications to the existing proteins). Although baseline constitutive expression is required to maintain cell viability, expression of the GCL subunits is also inducible in response to oxidative stress, GSH depletion, and exposure to toxic chemicals, with the Nrf2, AP-1, and NF-κB transcription factors regulating the inducible and constitutive expression of both subunits

In terms of enzyme functional regulation, GSH itself acts as a feedback inhibitor of GCL activity. Under normal physiologic substrate concentrations, the GCLC monomer alone may synthesize gamma-glutamylcysteine; however, the normal physiologic levels of GSH (estimated at around 5 mM) far exceeds the GSH K_{i} for GCLC, suggesting that only the GCL holoenzyme is functional under baseline conditions. However, during oxidative stress or toxic insults that can result in the depletion of cellular GSH or its oxidation to glutathione disulfide (GSSG), the function of any monomeric GCLC in the cell is likely to become quite important. In support of this hypothesis, mice lacking expression of the GCLM subunit due to genetic knockdown exhibit low levels of tissue GSH (~10–20% of the normal level), which is roughly the level of the GSH K_{i} for monomeric GCLC.

== Structure ==
=== Animal glutamate–cysteine ligase ===
Animal glutamate cysteine ligase (GCL) is a heterodimeric enzyme composed of two protein subunits that are coded by independent genes located on separate chromosomes:

- Glutamate cysteine ligase catalytic subunit (GCLC, ~73 kDa) possesses all of substrate and cofactor binding sites and is responsible for all of the catalysis.
- Glutamate cysteine ligase modifier subunit (GCLM, ~31 kDa) has no enzymatic activity on its own but increases the catalytic efficiency of GCLC when complexed in the holoenzyme.

In the majority of cells and tissues, the expression of GCLM protein is lower than GCLC and GCLM is therefore limiting in the formation of the holoenzyme complex. Thus, the sum total of cellular GCL activity is equal to the activity of the holoenzyme + the activity of the remaining monomeric GCLC. composed of a catalytic and a modulatory subunit. The catalytic subunit is necessary and sufficient for all GCL enzymatic activity, whereas the modulatory subunit increases the catalytic efficiency of the enzyme. Mice lacking the catalytic subunit (i.e., lacking all de novo GSH synthesis) die before birth. Mice lacking the modulatory subunit demonstrate no obvious phenotype, but exhibit marked decrease in GSH and increased sensitivity to toxic insults.

=== Plant glutamate cysteine ligase ===
The plant glutamate cysteine ligase is a redox-sensitive homodimeric enzyme, conserved in the plant kingdom. In an oxidizing environment, intermolecular disulfide bridges are formed and the enzyme switches to the dimeric active state. The midpoint potential of the critical cysteine pair is -318 mV. In addition to the redox-dependent control, the plant GCL enzyme is feedback inhibited by glutathione. GCL is exclusively located in plastids, and glutathione synthetase (GS) is dual-targeted to plastids and cytosol, thus GSH and gamma-glutamylcysteine are exported from the plastids. Studies also shown that restricting GCL activity to the cytosol or glutathione biosynthesis to the plastids is sufficient for normal plant development and stress tolerance. Both glutathione biosynthesis enzymes are essential in plants; knock-outs of GCL and GS are lethal to embryo and seedling, respectively.

As of late 2007, six structures have been solved for this class of enzymes, with PDB accession codes PDB: 1V4G, PDB: 1VA6, PDB: 2D32, PDB: 2D33, PDB: 2GWC, and PDB: 2GWD.
