= Small conditional RNA =

A small conditional RNA (scRNA) is a small RNA molecule or complex (typically less than approximately 100 nt) engineered to interact and change conformation conditionally in response to cognate molecular inputs so as to perform signal transduction in vitro, in situ, or in vivo.

In the absence of cognate input molecules, scRNAs are engineered to coexist metastably or stably without interacting. Detection of the cognate inputs initiates downstream conformational changes of one or more scRNAs leading to generation of the desired output signal. The output signal may be intended to read out the state of endogenous biological circuitry (e.g., mapping gene expression for biological research or medical diagnosis), or to regulate the state of endogenous biological circuitry (e.g., perturbing gene expression for biological research or medical treatment). scRNA sequences can be programmed to recognize different inputs or to activate different outputs, achieving even single-nucleotide sequence selectivity. scRNA signal transduction exploits principles from the emerging disciplines of dynamic RNA nanotechnology, molecular programming, and synthetic biology.

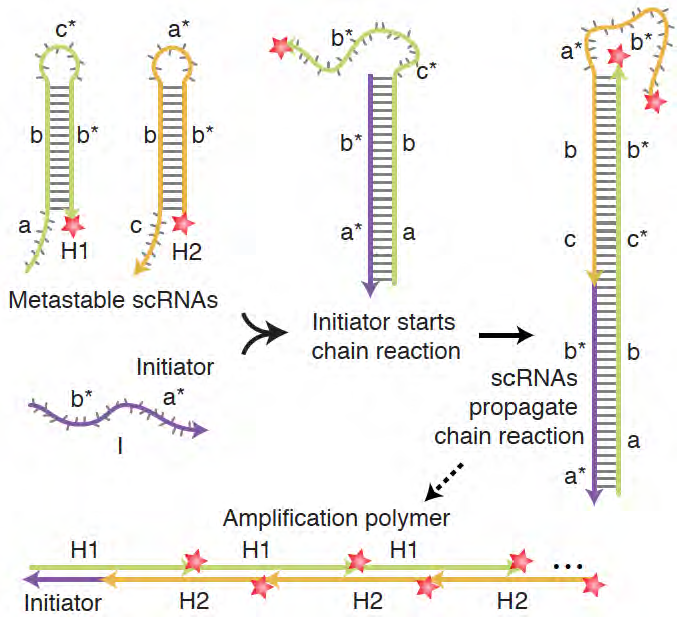
Figure 1. Fluorescent signal amplification using small conditional RNAs. Metastable fluorescent scRNAs self-assemble into fluorescent amplification polymers upon detection of a cognate RNA initiator. Initiator I nucleates with hairpin H1 via base pairing to single-stranded toehold '1', mediating a 3-way branch migration that opens the hairpin to form complex I·H1 containing single-stranded segment '3*-2*'. This complex nucleates with hairpin H2 by means of base pairing to toehold '3', mediating a branch migration that opens the hairpin to form complex I·H1·H2 containing single-stranded segment '2*-1*'. Thus, the initiator sequence is regenerated, providing the basis for a chain reaction of alternating H1 and H2 polymerization steps. Red stars denote fluorophores. Image from Choi et al. 2010; used with permission of the Nature Publishing Group.

== Examples of scRNA signal transduction ==
Fluorophore-labeled scRNAs have been engineered to transduce between detection of mRNA targets and generation of bright fluorescent amplification polymers in situ (Figure 1). In this context, scRNA signal transduction enables multiplexed mapping of mRNA expression within intact vertebrate embryos (Figure 2). scRNAs have been engineered to perform shape and sequence transduction to conditionally produce a Dicer substrate targeting 'silencing target' mRNA Y upon detection of an independent 'detection target' mRNA X, with subsequent Dicer processing yielding a small interfering RNA (siRNA) targeting mRNA Y for destruction (Figure 3). In this context, scRNA signal transduction provides a step towards implementing conditional RNA interference (Figure 4).

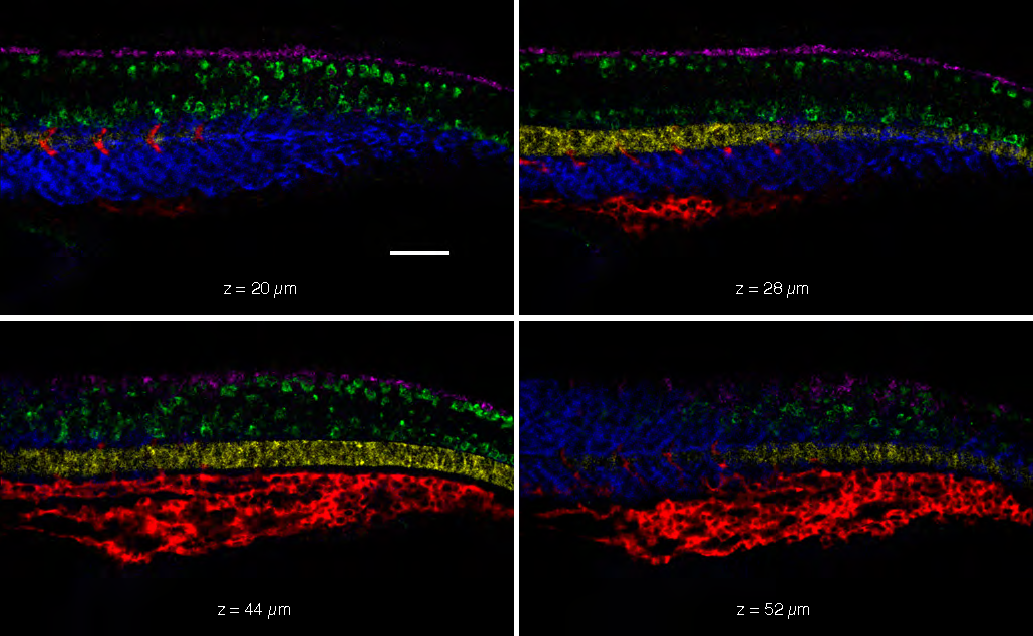
Figure 2. Simultaneous mapping of five different target mRNAs within an intact zebrafish embryo using scRNA signal amplification and confocal microscopy. RNA probes complementary to mRNA targets trigger chain reactions in which fluorophore- labeled scRNAs self-assemble into tethered fluorescent amplification polymers. The programmability and sequence selectivity of these amplification cascades enable five scRNA amplifiers to operate independently at the same time in the same sample, each staining for expression of one of the five target mRNAs. Scale bar: 50 μm. Image from Choi et al. 2010; used with permission of the Nature Publishing Group.

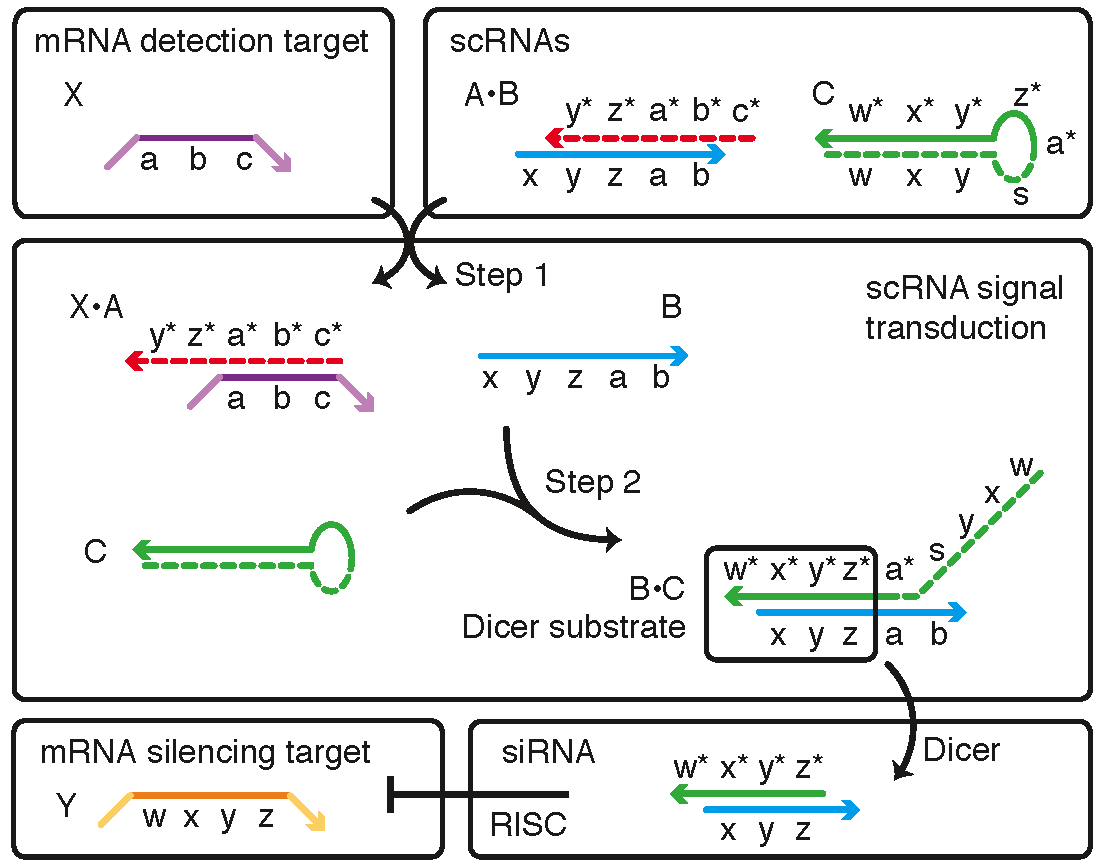
Figure 3. Conditional Dicer substrate formation via shape and sequence transduction with small conditional RNAs. scRNA A·B detects mRNA detection target X (containing subsequence 'a-b-c'), leading to production of Dicer substrate B·C targeting mRNA silencing target Y (containing independent subsequence 'w-x-y-z'). scRNAs A·B and C are stable in the absence of X. A swaps B for X (step 1) via toehold-mediated 3-way branch migration and spontaneous dissociation. B assembles with C (step 2) via loop/toehold nucleation and 3-way branch migration to form Dicer substrate B·C. Chemical modifications (2′OMe-RNA) prevent degradation: A and part of C (dashed backbone). Image from Hochrein et al. 2013; used with permission of the American Chemical Society.

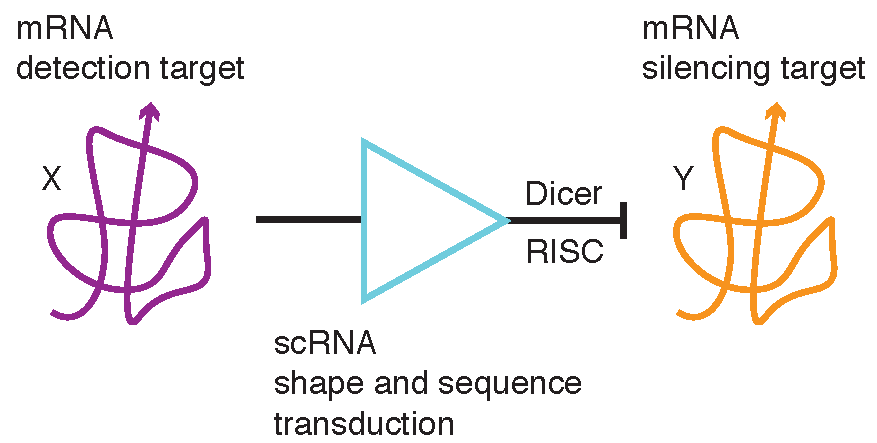
Figure 4. Conditional RNAi (if gene X is transcribed, silence independent gene Y) provides a conceptual framework for exerting spatiotemporal control over gene knockdown. Toward this end, small conditional RNAs (scRNAs) interact and change conformation to transduce between binding of mRNA 'detection target' X and production of a Dicer substrate targeting independent mRNA 'silencing target' Y. Image from Hochrein et al. 2013; used with permission of the American Chemical Society.

== Design elements ==
scRNAs can be engineered to exploit diverse design elements:

- scRNA reactants may be metastable or stable
- scRNA signal transduction cascades can be catalytic or non-catalytic
- scRNAs can nucleate with each other or with input or output molecules via toehold/toehold nucleation, loop/toehold nucleation, or template/toehold nucleation
- scRNAs can dissociate with each other or with input or output molecules via 3-way branch migration, 4-way branch migration, or spontaneous dissociation
- scRNA reactants can be monomers, dimers, or other multimers
