= Golf Club of Lebanon =

Golf club and course in Lebanon

- Interactive map of Golf Club of Lebanon
- 33.8494°N 35.4903°E

Club information
- Location: Beirut, Lebanon
- Established: 1923; 103 years ago
- Type: private
- Greens: Tifdwarf Bermuda
- Website: www.golfcluboflebanon.com

Golf Club of Lebanon is a country club and golf course located in Beirut, Lebanon. The club was originally opened in Khalde in 1923. Today, the course occupies 420,000 m^{2} (4,500,000 sq ft) in one of the last green spaces in Beirut. The 18-hole course meets international standards and the club also includes facilities for swimming, tennis, football, squash, chess, and other activities.

Due to the club's geopolitical position, it has come under threat throughout its history. In 1982, the fairways of the course were bulldozed by the Israeli army during the siege of Beirut. In 2023, it was reported that Hezbollah was looking to acquire the course's grounds.

As of 2024, it is the only golf course in Lebanon.
