= Γ-L-Glutamyl-L-cysteine =

γ-l-Glutamyl-l-cysteine
- Stereo, skeletal formula of gamma-glutamylcysteine ((2S)-2-amino, -[(1R)-1-carboxy])

Names
- IUPAC name γ-Glutamylcysteine
- Systematic IUPAC name (2S)-2-Amino-5-{[(1R)-1-carboxy-2-sulfanylethyl]amino}-5-oxopentanoic acid
- Other names gamma-Glutamylcysteine

Identifiers
CAS Number	636-58-8
3D model (JSmol)	Interactive image
Beilstein Reference	1729154
ChEBI	CHEBI:17515
ChEMBL	ChEMBL460831
ChemSpider	110467
DrugBank	DB03408
ECHA InfoCard	100.164.128
KEGG	C00669
MeSH	gamma-glutamylcysteine
PubChem CID	123938
UNII	M984VJS48P
CompTox Dashboard (EPA)	DTXSID90212978
- InChI: InChI=1S/C8H14N2O5S/c9-4(7(12)13)1-2-6(11)10-5(3-16)8(14)15/h4-5,16H,1-3,9H2,(H,10,11)(H,12,13)(H,14,15)/t4-,5-/m0/s1 Key: RITKHVBHSGLULN-WHFBIAKZSA-N
- SMILES: C(CC(=O)N[C@@H](CS)C(=O)O)[C@@H](C(=O)O)N

Properties
Chemical formula	C_{8}H_{14}N_{2}O_{5}S
Molar mass	250.27 g·mol^{−1}
Appearance	White, opaque crystals
log P	−1.168
Acidity (pK_{a})	2.214
Basicity (pK_{b})	11.783

Related compounds
Related alkanoic acids	Tiopronin; Bucillamine; Oxalyldiaminopropionic acid; N(6)-Carboxymethyllysine
- Except where otherwise noted, data are given for materials in their standard state (at 25 °C [77 °F], 100 kPa). verify (what is ?) Infobox references

γ-L-Glutamyl-L-cysteine, also known as γ-glutamylcysteine (GGC), is a dipeptide found in animals, plants, fungi, some bacteria, and archaea. It has a relatively unusual γ-bond between the constituent amino acids, L-glutamic acid and L-cysteine and is a key intermediate in the γ-glutamyl cycle first described by Meister in the 1970s. It is the most immediate precursor to the antioxidant glutathione.

== Biosynthesis ==
GGC is synthesized from L-glutamic acid and L-cysteine in the cytoplasm of virtually all cells in an adenosine triphosphate (ATP)-requiring reaction catalyzed by the enzyme glutamate-cysteine ligase (GCL, EC 6.3.2.2; formerly γ-glutamylcysteine synthetase). The production of GGC is the rate limiting step in glutathione synthesis.

=== Occurrence ===
GGC occurs in human plasma in the range of 1 to 5 μM and intracellularly at 5 to 10 μM. The intracellular concentration is generally low because GGC is rapidly bonded with a glycine to form glutathione. This second and final reaction step in glutathione biosynthesis is catalysed by the activity of the ATP dependent glutathione synthetase enzyme.

=== Importance ===
GGC is essential to mammalian life. Mice that have had the glutamate-cysteine ligase (GCL) gene knocked out do not develop beyond the embryo stage and die before birth. This is because GGC is vital for the biosynthesis of glutathione. Since the production of cellular GGC in humans slows down with age, as well as during the progression of many chronic diseases, it has been postulated that supplementation with GGC could offer health benefits. Such GGC supplementation may also be of benefit in situations where glutathione has been acutely lowered below optimum, such as following strenuous exercise, during trauma or episodes of poisoning.

Several review articles have been published exploring the therapeutic potential of GGC to replenish glutathione in age-related and chronic disease states such as Alzheimer's disease. GGC also shows antioxidant properties.

=== Availability ===
GGC synthesis for commercial use is exceedingly difficult and, until recently, no commercially viable process for large scale production had been developed. The major drawback preventing the commercial success of chemical synthesis of GGC is the number of steps involved due to the three reactive groups on L-glutamic acid and L-cysteine molecules, which must be masked to achieve the correct regioisomer. Similarly, there have been numerous attempts at biological production of GGC by fermentation over the years and none have been successfully commercialised.

Towards the end of 2019, a biocatalytic process was successfully commercialized. GGC is now available as a supplement in the US under the trademarked name of Glyteine and Continual-G.

== Bioavailability and supplementation ==
A human clinical study in healthy, non-fasting adults demonstrated that orally administered GGC can significantly increase lymphocyte GSH levels indicating systemic bioavailability, validating the therapeutic potential of GGC.

Animal model studies with GGC have supported a potential therapeutic role for GGC in both the reduction of oxidative stress induced damage in tissues, including the brain and as a treatment for sepsis.

In contrast, supplementation with glutathione is incapable of increasing cellular glutathione since the GSH concentration found in the extracellular environment is much lower than that found intracellularly by about a thousand-fold. This large difference means that there is an insurmountable concentration gradient that prohibits extracellular glutathione from entering cells. Although currently unproven, GGC may be the pathway intermediate of glutathione transportation in multicellular organisms.

== Safety ==
Safety assessment of GGC sodium salt in rats has shown that orally administered (gavage) GGC was not acutely toxic at the limit single dosage of 2000 mg/kg (monitored over 14 days) and demonstrated no adverse effects following repeated daily doses of 1000 mg/kg over 90 days.

== History ==
In 1983, pioneers of glutathione research, Mary E. Anderson and Alton Meister, were the first to report on the ability of GGC to augment cellular GSH levels in a rat model. Intact GGC, which was synthesised in their own laboratory, was shown to be taken up by cells, bypassing the rate-limiting step of the GCL enzyme to be converted to glutathione. Control experiments with combinations of the constituent amino acids that make up GGC, including L-glutamic acid and L-cysteine, were ineffective. Since this initial work, only a few studies using GGC were performed due to the fact that there was no commercial source of GGC on the market. Subsequently, GGC has become commercially available and studies investigating its efficacy have commenced.
