= Aminobutyric acid =

Aminobutyric acid or aminobutanoic acid refers to any of three isomeric chemical compounds that differ in the position of the amino group (-NH₂) relative to the carboxyl group (-COOH). These compounds have distinct biological roles and chemical properties.

Isomers

- α-Aminobutyric acid (AABA): An intermediate in methionine metabolism, involved in peptide biosynthesis.
- β-Aminobutyric acid (BABA): A plant defense activator, enhancing resistance to pathogens.
- γ-Aminobutyric acid (GABA): The primary inhibitory neurotransmitter in the central nervous system, regulating neuronal activity and reducing stress.
