= Ketobutyric acid =

Ketobutyric acid, ketobutanoic acid, oxobutyric acid, or oxobutanoic acid may refer to the following chemical compounds:

- α-Ketobutyric acid (2-oxobutyric acid)
- β-Ketobutyric acid (acetoacetic acid or 3-oxobutyric acid)

In addition, oxobutyric acid, or oxobutanoic acid may refer to:

- 4-Oxobutanoic acid (succinic semialdehyde, 4-oxobutyric acid)

== See also ==
- Dicarbonyl
