= Glutathione synthetase =

Enzyme

GSS
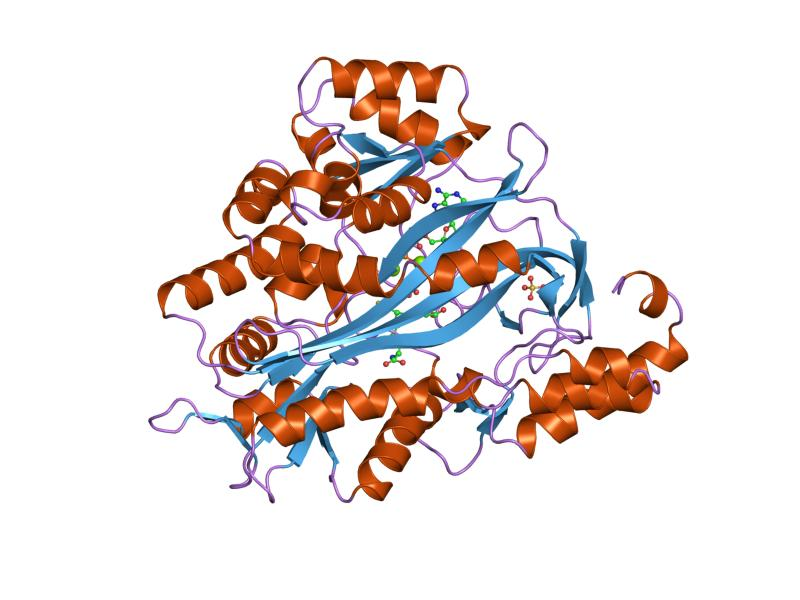
- Human glutathione synthetase

Identifiers
- Aliases: GSS, GSHS, HEL-S-64p, HEL-S-88n, glutathione synthetase
- External IDs: OMIM: 601002; MGI: 95852; GeneCards: GSS
Available structures
PDB	Ortholog search: PDBe RCSB
PDB	List of PDB id codes 2HGS
Enzyme activity
EC #	BRENDA	ExPASy	KEGG	MetaCyc
6.3.2.3	↗	↗	↗	↗

Gene location (Human)
Chr.	Chromosome 20 (human)
Band	20q11.22	Start	34,928,432 bp
Band	20q11.22	End	34,956,027 bp

Gene location (Mouse)
Chr.	Chromosome 2 (mouse)
Band	2|2 H1	Start	155,405,101 bp
Band	2|2 H1	End	155,434,730 bp
RNA expression pattern
Bgee	Human / Mouse (ortholog); Top expressed in: frontal pole; middle frontal gyrus; paraflocculus of cerebellum; mucosa of transverse colon; rectum; right adrenal gland; right adrenal cortex; sperm; corpus epididymis; left adrenal gland / Top expressed in: right kidney; lens; proximal tubule; human kidney; duodenum; yolk sac; epithelium of lens; blastocyst; outer renal medulla; gastric mucosa; More reference expression data
BioGPS	n/a
Gene ontology
Molecular function	nucleotide binding; protein homodimerization activity; glutathione binding; peptide binding; glycine binding; metal ion binding; ligase activity; protein binding; ATP binding; magnesium ion binding; identical protein binding; glutathione synthase activity
Cellular component	extracellular exosome; cytosol
Biological process	response to amino acid; response to cadmium ion; response to drug; cellular amino acid metabolic process; ageing; glutathione biosynthetic process; response to oxidative stress; nervous system development; response to tumor necrosis factor; response to nutrient levels
Sources:Amigo / QuickGO
Orthologs
Databases	NCBI: entry; OMA: entry
Species	Human	Mouse
Entrez	2937	14854
Ensembl	ENSG00000100983	ENSMUSG00000027610
UniProt	P48637	P51855
RefSeq (mRNA)	NM_000178; NM_001322494; NM_001322495	NM_001291111; NM_008180
RefSeq (protein)	NP_000169; NP_001309423; NP_001309424	NP_001278040; NP_032206
Location (UCSC)	Chr 20: 34.93 – 34.96 Mb	Chr 2: 155.41 – 155.43 Mb
PubMed search
- Wikidata
View/Edit Human	View/Edit Mouse

glutathione synthase
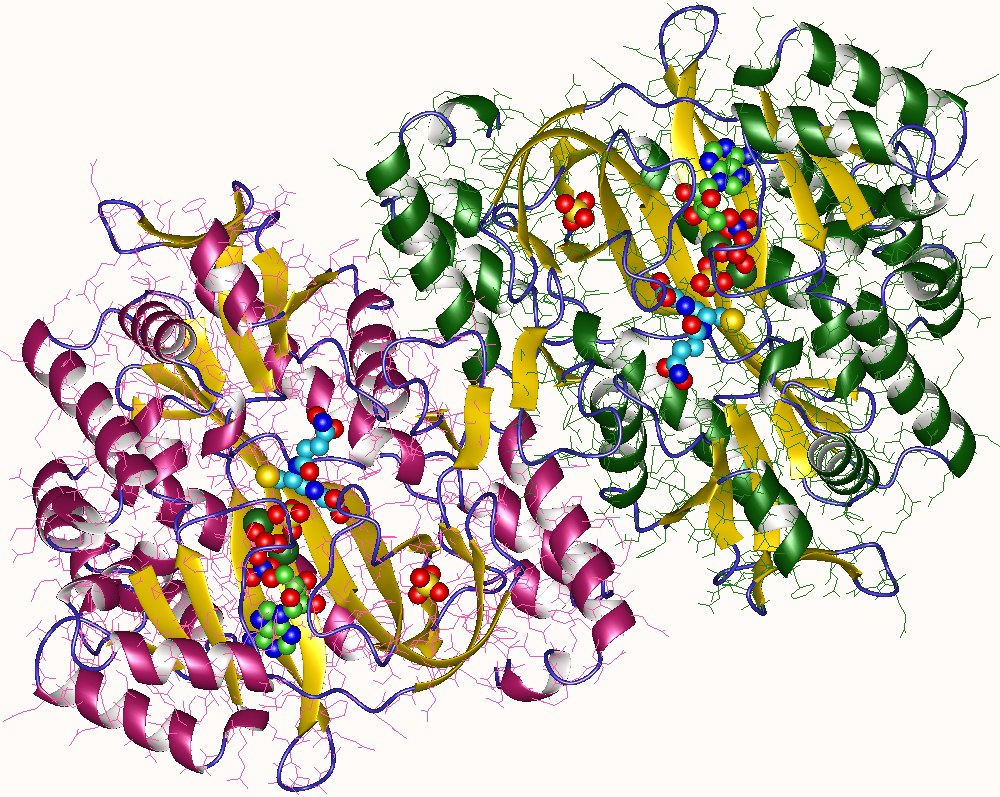
- glutathione synthetase dimer, Human

Identifiers
- EC no.: 6.3.2.3
- CAS no.: 9023-62-5

Databases
- BRENDA: enzyme data
- ExPASy: NiceZyme view
- KEGG: enzyme entry
- MetaCyc: metabolic pathway
- Rhea: reactions
- PDB structures: RCSB PDB PDBe PDBsum
- Gene Ontology: AmiGO / QuickGO
Search
- PMC: articles
- PubMed: articles
- NCBI: proteins

Eukaryotic glutathione synthase

Identifiers
- Symbol: GSH_synthase
- Pfam: PF03199
- Pfam clan: CL0483
- InterPro: IPR004887
- SCOP2: 2hgs / SCOPe / SUPFAM
Available protein structures:
- PDB: IPR004887 PF03199 (ECOD; PDBsum)
- AlphaFold: IPR004887; PF03199

Eukaryotic glutathione synthase, ATP binding domain

Identifiers
- Symbol: GSH_synth_ATP
- Pfam: PF03917
- InterPro: IPR005615
- SCOP2: 1m0t / SCOPe / SUPFAM
Available protein structures:
- PDB: IPR005615 PF03917 (ECOD; PDBsum)
- AlphaFold: IPR005615; PF03917

Prokaryotic glutathione synthetase, N-terminal domain
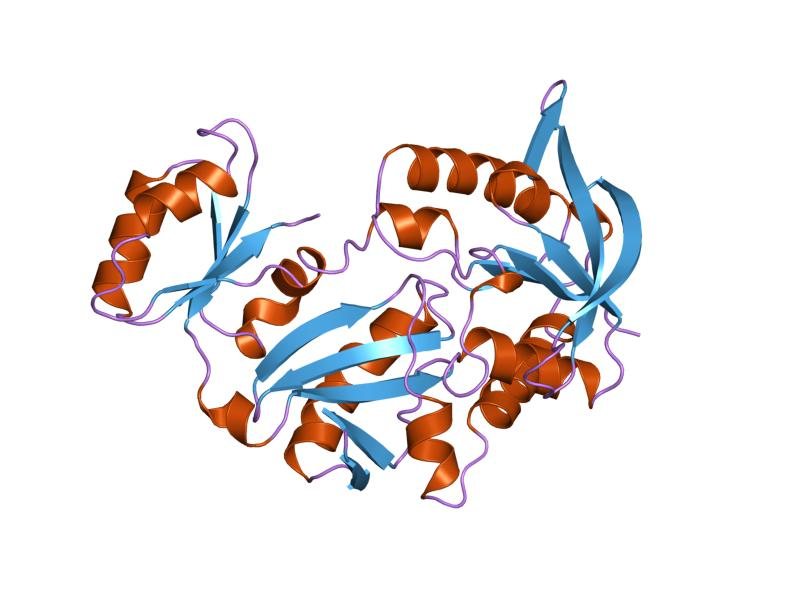
- Structure of escherichia coli glutathione synthetase at ph 7.5

Identifiers
- Symbol: GSH-S_N
- Pfam: PF02951
- InterPro: IPR004215
- SCOP2: 1glv / SCOPe / SUPFAM
Available protein structures:
- PDB: IPR004215 PF02951 (ECOD; PDBsum)
- AlphaFold: IPR004215; PF02951

Prokaryotic glutathione synthetase, ATP-grasp domain
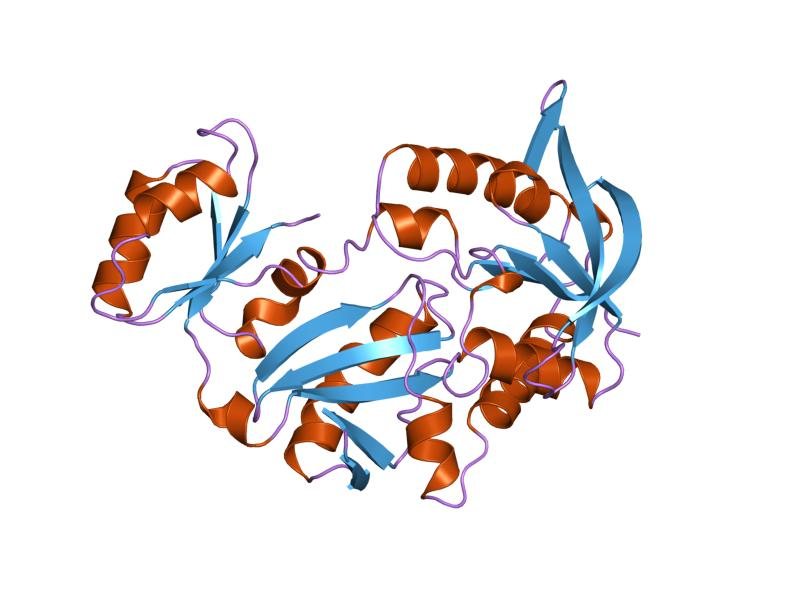
- Structure of escherichia coli glutathione synthetase at ph 7.5

Identifiers
- Symbol: GSH-S_ATP
- Pfam: PF02955
- Pfam clan: CL0179
- InterPro: IPR004218
- SCOP2: 1glv / SCOPe / SUPFAM
Available protein structures:
- PDB: IPR004218 PF02955 (ECOD; PDBsum)
- AlphaFold: IPR004218; PF02955

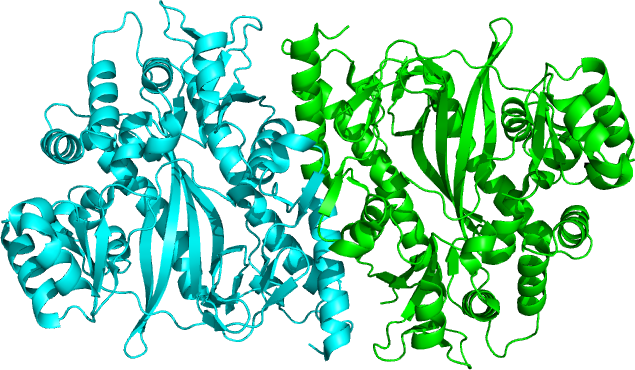
Structure of glutathione synthetase in yeast. Generated from 1M0W.

Glutathione synthetase (GSS) (EC 6.3.2.3) is the second enzyme in the glutathione (GSH) biosynthesis pathway. It catalyses the condensation of gamma-glutamylcysteine and glycine, to form glutathione. Glutathione synthetase is also a potent antioxidant. It is found in many species including bacteria, yeast, mammals, and plants.

In humans, glutathione synthetase is encoded by the gene GSS. Defects in GSS are inherited in an autosomal recessive way and are the cause of severe metabolic acidosis, 5-oxoprolinuria, increased rate of haemolysis, and defective function of the central nervous system. Deficiencies in GSS can cause a spectrum of deleterious symptoms in plants and human beings alike.

In eukaryotes, this is a homodimeric enzyme. The substrate-binding domain has a three-layer alpha/beta/alpha structure. This enzyme utilizes and stabilizes an acylphosphate intermediate to later perform a favorable nucleophilic attack of glycine.

== Structure ==
Human and yeast glutathione synthetases are homodimers, meaning they are composed of two identical subunits of itself non-covalently bound to each other. On the other hand, E. coli glutathione synthetase is a homotetramer. Nevertheless, they are part of the ATP-grasp superfamily, which consists of 21 enzymes that contain an ATP-grasp fold. Each subunit interacts with each other through alpha helix and beta sheet hydrogen bonding interactions and contains two domains. One domain facilitates the ATP-grasp mechanism and the other is the catalytic active site for γ-glutamylcysteine. The ATP-grasp fold is conserved within the ATP-grasp superfamily and is characterized by two alpha helices and beta sheets that hold onto the ATP molecule between them. The domain containing the active site exhibits interesting properties of specificity. In contrast to γ-glutamylcysteine synthetase, glutathione synthetase accepts a large variety of glutamyl-modified analogs of γ-glutamylcysteine, but is much more specific for cysteine-modified analogs of γ-glutamylcysteine. Crystalline structures have shown glutathione synthetase bound to GSH, ADP, two magnesium ions, and a sulfate ion. Two magnesium ions function to stabilize the acylphosphate intermediate, facilitate binding of ATP, and activate removal of phosphate group from ATP. Sulfate ion serves as a replacement for inorganic phosphate once the acylphosphate intermediate is formed inside the active site.

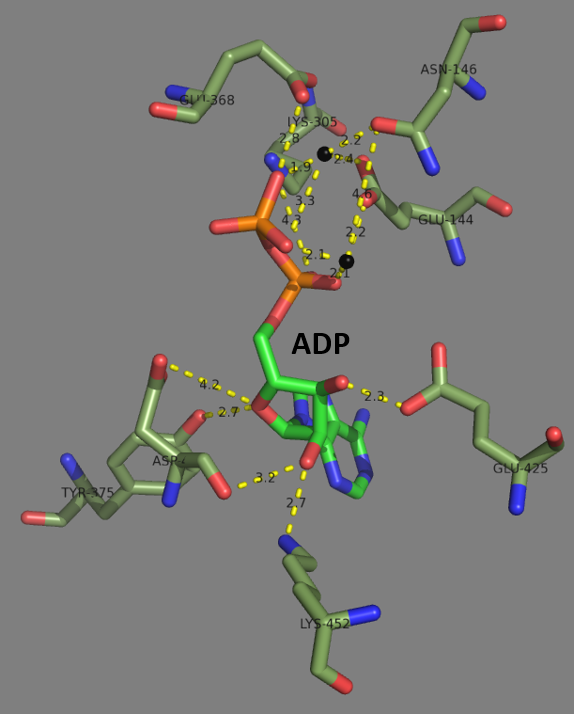
Key residues that interact with ATP near the active site. Magnesium ions are shown in black. Generated from 2HGS.

As of late 2007, 7 structures have been solved for this class of enzymes, with PDB accession codes PDB: 1GLV, PDB: 1GSA, PDB: 1GSH, PDB: 1M0T, PDB: 1M0W, PDB: 2GLT, and PDB: 2HGS.

== Mechanism ==
Glutathione synthase catalyzes the chemical reaction

ATP + gamma-L-glutamyl-L-cysteine + glycine $\rightleftharpoons$ ADP + phosphate + glutathione

The 3 substrates of this enzyme are ATP, gamma-L-glutamyl-L-cysteine, and glycine, whereas its 3 products are ADP, phosphate, and glutathione.

This enzyme belongs to the family of ligases, specifically those forming carbon-nitrogen bonds as acid-D-amino-acid ligases (peptide synthases). The systematic name of this enzyme class is gamma-L-glutamyl-L-cysteine:glycine ligase (ADP-forming). Other names in common use include glutathione synthetase, and GSH synthetase. This enzyme participates in glutamate metabolism and glutathione metabolism. At least one compound, Phosphinate is known to inhibit this enzyme.

The biosynthetic mechanisms for synthetases use energy from nucleoside triphosphates, whereas synthases do not. Glutathione synthetase stays true to this rule, in that it uses the energy generated by ATP. Initially, the carboxylate group on γ-glutamylcysteine is converted into an acyl phosphate by the transfer of an inorganic phosphate group of ATP to generate an acyl phosphate intermediate. Then the amino group of glycine participates in a nucleophilic attack, displacing the phosphate group and forming GSH. After the final GSH product is made, it can be used by glutathione peroxidase to neutralize reactive oxygen species (ROS) such as H_{2}O_{2} or Glutathione S-transferases in the detoxification of xenobiotics.

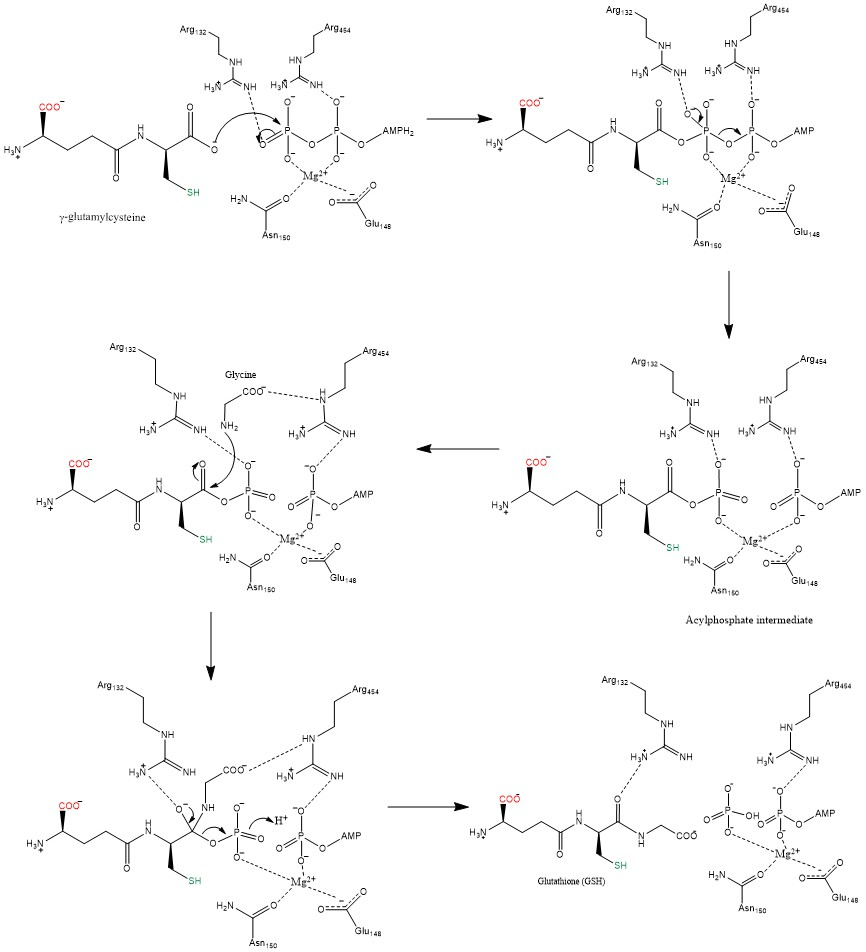
Reaction mechanism for GSH biosynthesis. Glutamate and cysteine side chains are shown in red and green, respectively.

== Function ==
Glutathione synthetase is important for a variety of biological functions in multiple organisms. In Arabidopsis thaliana, low levels of glutathione synthetase have resulted in increased vulnerability to stressors such as heavy metals, toxic organic chemicals, and oxidative stress. The presence of a thiol functional group allows its product GSH to serve both as an effective oxidizing and reducing agent in numerous biological scenarios. Thiols can easily accept a pair of electrons and become oxidized to disulfides, and the disulfides can be readily reduced to regenerate thiols. Additionally, the thiol side chain of cysteines serve as potent nucleophiles and react with oxidants and electrophilic species that would otherwise cause damage to the cell. Interactions with certain metals also stabilize thiolate intermediates.

In humans, glutathione synthetase functions in a similar manner. Its product GSH participates in cellular pathways involved in homeostasis and cellular maintenance. For instance, glutathione peroxidases catalyze the oxidation of GSH to glutathione disulfide (GSSG) by reducing free radicals and reactive oxygen species such as hydrogen peroxide. Glutathione S-transferase uses GSH to clean up various metabolites, xenobiotics, and electrophiles to mercapturates for excretion. Because of its antioxidant role, GSS mostly produce GSH inside the cytoplasm of liver cells and imported to mitochondria where detoxification occurs. GSH is also essential for the activation of the immune system to generate robust defense mechanisms against invading pathogens. GSH is capable of preventing infection from the influenza virus.

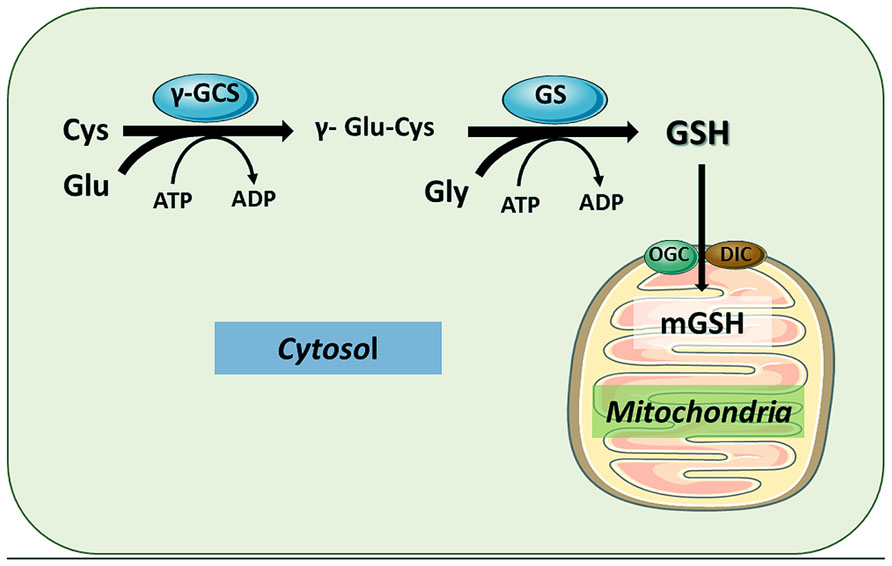
Glutathione (GSH) is synthesized in the cytoplasm of liver cells and imported to the mitochondria where it functions as a cofactor for a number of antioxidant and detoxifying enzymes.

== Clinical significance ==
Patients with mutations in the GSS gene develop glutathione synthetase (GSS) deficiency, an autosomal recessive disorder. Patients develop a wide range of symptoms depending on the severity of the mutations. Mildly affected patients experience a compensated haemolytic anaemia because mutations affect stability of the enzyme. Moderately and severely affected individuals have enzymes with dysfunctional catalytic sites, rendering it unable to participate in detoxification reactions. Physiological symptoms include metabolic acidosis, neurological defects, and increased susceptibility to pathogenic infections.

Treatment of individuals with glutathione synthetase deficiency generally involve therapeutic treatments to address mild to severe symptoms and conditions. In order to treat metabolic acidosis, severely affected patients are given large amounts of bicarbonate and antioxidants such as vitamin E and vitamin C. In mild cases, ascorbate and N-acetylcysteine have been shown to increase glutathione levels and increase erythrocyte production. Bbecause glutathione synthetase deficiency is so rare, it is poorly understood. The disease also appears on a spectrum, so it is even more difficult to generalize among the few cases that occur.

== See also ==
- Glutathione synthetase deficiency
- Glutathione
- Liver
