= GCLC =

Protein-coding gene in the species Homo sapiens

Identifiers
- Aliases: GCLC, GCL, GCS, GLCL, GLCLC, glutamate-cysteine ligase catalytic subunit
- External IDs: OMIM: 606857; MGI: 104990; GeneCards: GCLC
Enzyme activity
EC #	BRENDA	ExPASy	KEGG	MetaCyc
6.3.2.2	↗	↗	↗	↗

Gene location (Human)
Chr.	Chromosome 6 (human)
Band	6p12.1	Start	53,497,341 bp
Band	6p12.1	End	53,616,970 bp

Gene location (Mouse)
Chr.	Chromosome 9 (mouse)
Band	9 E1|9 43.36 cM	Start	77,661,817 bp
Band	9 E1|9 43.36 cM	End	77,701,767 bp
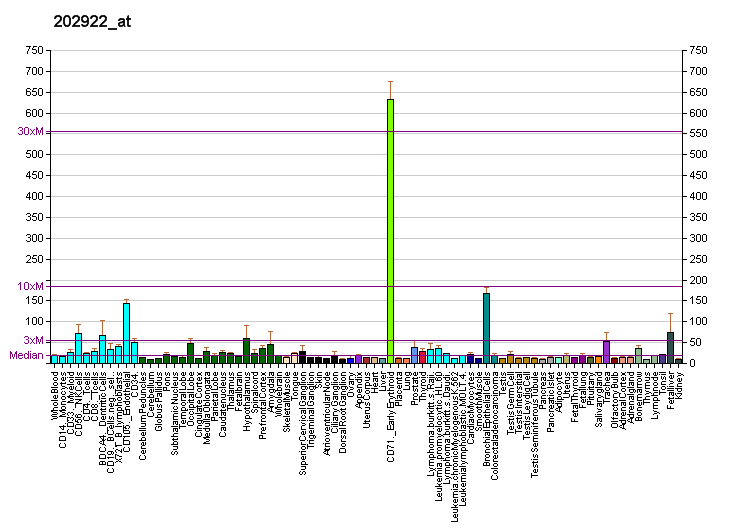

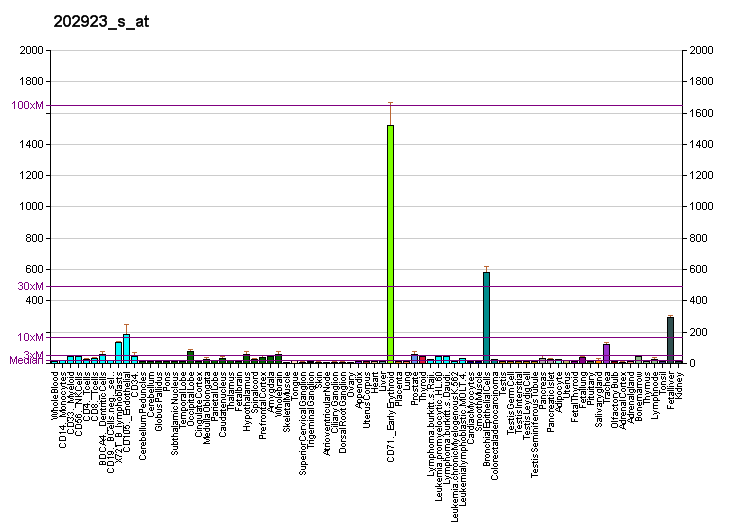
RNA expression pattern
Bgee	Human / Mouse (ortholog); Top expressed in: bronchial epithelial cell; right uterine tube; olfactory zone of nasal mucosa; gingival epithelium; liver; nasal epithelium; islet of Langerhans; epithelium of colon; jejunal mucosa; right lobe of liver / Top expressed in: epithelium of stomach; left lobe of liver; right lung lobe; right kidney; seminal vesicula; human kidney; epithelium of lens; transitional epithelium of urinary bladder; stroma of bone marrow; proximal tubule; More reference expression data
BioGPS	More reference expression data
Gene ontology
Molecular function	nucleotide binding; ADP binding; ligase activity; glutamate-cysteine ligase activity; protein heterodimerization activity; ATP binding; magnesium ion binding; glutamate binding; catalytic activity
Cellular component	cytosol; glutamate-cysteine ligase complex
Biological process	negative regulation of neuron apoptotic process; response to drug; glutathione metabolic process; cysteine metabolic process; negative regulation of extrinsic apoptotic signaling pathway; response to heat; negative regulation of apoptotic process; response to arsenic-containing substance; response to oxidative stress; cell redox homeostasis; regulation of mitochondrial depolarization; negative regulation of protein ubiquitination; apoptotic mitochondrial changes; response to nitrosative stress; response to hormone; glutamate metabolic process; negative regulation of transcription, DNA-templated; positive regulation of proteasomal ubiquitin-dependent protein catabolic process; L-ascorbic acid metabolic process; cellular response to insulin stimulus; ageing; negative regulation of hepatic stellate cell activation; cellular response to thyroxine stimulus; cellular response to follicle-stimulating hormone stimulus; cellular response to fibroblast growth factor stimulus; response to human chorionic gonadotropin; response to interleukin-1; cellular response to mechanical stimulus; response to nutrient; response to activity; response to cadmium ion; cellular response to hepatocyte growth factor stimulus; cellular response to glucose stimulus; glutathione biosynthetic process
Sources:Amigo / QuickGO
Orthologs
Databases	NCBI: entry; OMA: entry
Species	Human	Mouse
Entrez	2729	14629
Ensembl	ENSG00000001084	ENSMUSG00000032350
UniProt	P48506	P97494
RefSeq (mRNA)	NM_001498; NM_001197115	NM_010295
RefSeq (protein)	NP_001184044; NP_001489	NP_034425
Location (UCSC)	Chr 6: 53.5 – 53.62 Mb	Chr 9: 77.66 – 77.7 Mb
PubMed search
- Wikidata
View/Edit Human	View/Edit Mouse

Glutamate–cysteine ligase catalytic subunit is an enzyme that in humans is encoded by the GCLC gene.

== Function ==
Glutamate–cysteine ligase, also known as gamma-glutamylcysteine synthetase, is the first rate limiting enzyme of glutathione synthesis. The enzyme consists of two subunits, a heavy catalytic subunit and a light regulatory subunit. The gene encoding the catalytic subunit encodes a protein of 367 amino acids with a calculated molecular weight of 72.773 kDa and maps to chromosome 6. The regulatory subunit is derived from a different gene located on chromosome 1p22-p21. Deficiency of gamma-glutamylcysteine synthetase in human is associated with enzymopathic hemolytic anemia.
