= CEBPG =

Protein-coding gene in the species Homo sapiens

Identifiers
- Aliases: CEBPG, GPE1BP, IG/EBP-1, CCAAT/enhancer binding protein gamma, CCAAT enhancer binding protein gamma
- External IDs: OMIM: 138972; MGI: 104982; GeneCards: CEBPG

Gene location (Human)
Chr.	Chromosome 19 (human)
Band	19q13.11	Start	33,373,685 bp
Band	19q13.11	End	33,382,686 bp

Gene location (Mouse)
Chr.	Chromosome 7 (mouse)
Band	7|7 B2	Start	34,745,847 bp
Band	7|7 B2	End	34,755,998 bp
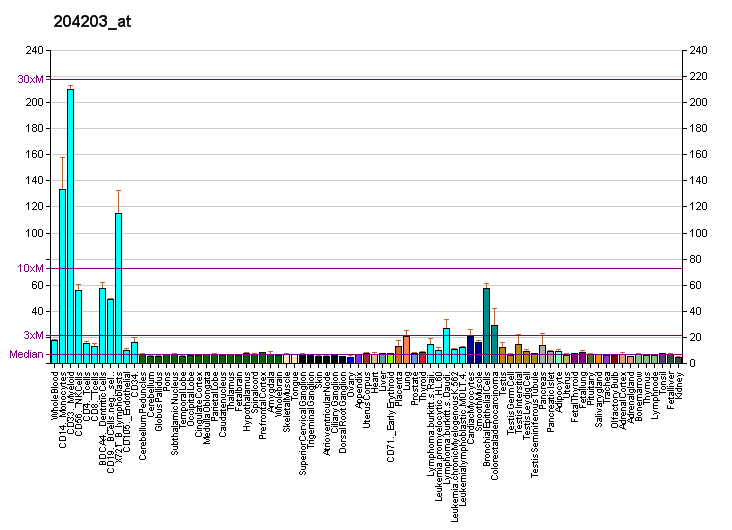
RNA expression pattern
Bgee	Human / Mouse (ortholog); Top expressed in: secondary oocyte; mucosa of colon; mucosa of sigmoid colon; muscle of thigh; middle temporal gyrus; mucosa of transverse colon; body of tongue; gingival epithelium; jejunum; jejunal mucosa / Top expressed in: olfactory epithelium; condyle; parotid gland; zygote; conjunctival fornix; lacrimal gland; secondary oocyte; seminal vesicula; fossa; left colon; More reference expression data
BioGPS	More reference expression data
Gene ontology
Molecular function	DNA binding; protein homodimerization activity; DNA-binding transcription factor activity; DNA-binding transcription activator activity, RNA polymerase II-specific; transcription factor binding; RNA polymerase II cis-regulatory region sequence-specific DNA binding; protein binding; sequence-specific DNA binding; protein heterodimerization activity; DNA-binding transcription factor activity, RNA polymerase II-specific; double-stranded DNA binding; RNA polymerase II cis-regulatory region sequence-specific DNA binding, bending
Cellular component	nucleoplasm; nucleus
Biological process	regulation of transcription, DNA-templated; positive regulation of DNA repair; positive regulation of DNA-binding transcription factor activity; negative regulation of DNA-binding transcription factor activity; transcription, DNA-templated; enucleate erythrocyte differentiation; immune response; mRNA metabolic process; B cell differentiation; positive regulation of DNA binding; positive regulation of transcription by RNA polymerase II; natural killer cell mediated cytotoxicity; transcription by RNA polymerase II; liver development; regulation of transcription by RNA polymerase II
Sources:Amigo / QuickGO
Orthologs
Databases	NCBI: entry; OMA: entry
Species	Human	Mouse
Entrez	1054	12611
Ensembl	ENSG00000153879	ENSMUSG00000056216
UniProt	P53567	P53568
RefSeq (mRNA)	NM_001806; NM_001252296	NM_009884
RefSeq (protein)	NP_001239225; NP_001797	NP_034014
Location (UCSC)	Chr 19: 33.37 – 33.38 Mb	Chr 7: 34.75 – 34.76 Mb
PubMed search
- Wikidata
View/Edit Human	View/Edit Mouse

CCAAT/enhancer-binding protein gamma (C/EBPγ) is a protein that in humans is encoded by the CEBPG gene. This gene has no introns.

The C/EBP family of transcription factors regulates viral and cellular CCAAT/enhancer element-mediated transcription. C/EBP proteins contain the bZIP region, which is characterized by two motifs in the C-terminal half of the protein: a basic region involved in DNA binding and a leucine zipper motif involved in dimerization. The C/EBP family consist of several related proteins, C/EBPα, C/EBPβ, C/EBPγ, C/EBPδ, C/EBPζ, and C/EBPε, that form homodimers and that form heterodimers with each other. CCAAT/enhancer binding protein gamma may cooperate with Fos to bind the positive regulatory element-I (PRE-I) enhancer elements.

C/EBPγ forms heterodimer with ATF4 for transcriptional activation of target genes in autophagy specifically to amino acid starvation.

C/EBPγ along with its regulator, the trauma-induced transcription factor EGR1, plays an important role in the development of chronic pain and mechanical hypersensitivity after some types of injury or surgery.
