= CEBP =

CEBP may refer to:

- CEBPA, a human gene that modulates leptin expression
- CCAAT-enhancer-binding proteins or C/EBPs
