= Adipogenesis =

Process of stem cells differentiating into fat cells

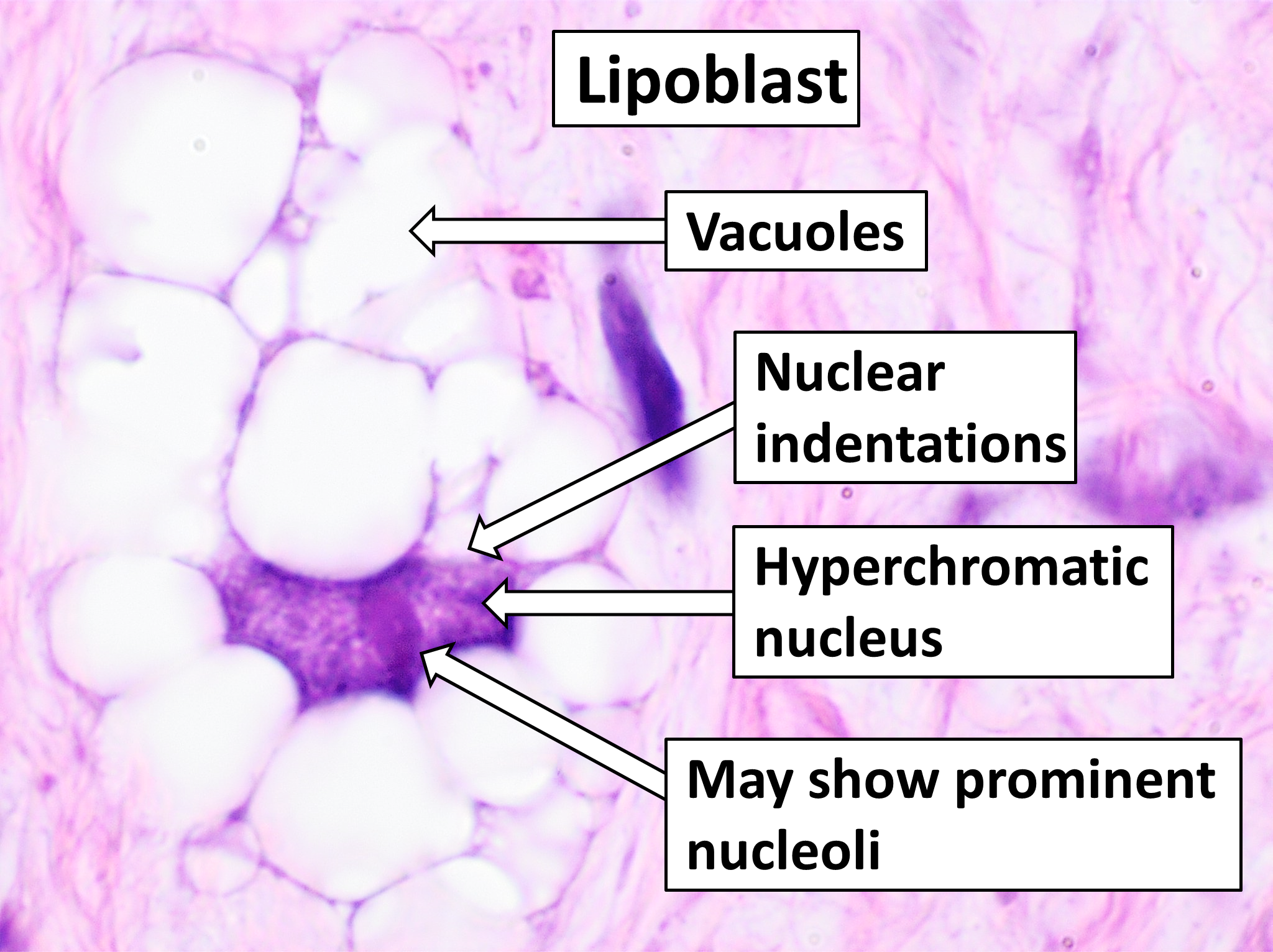
Histology features of a lipoblast, also known as an adipocyte precursor cell or preadipocyte.

Adipogenesis is the formation of adipocytes (fat cells) from stem cells. It involves two phases, determination, and terminal differentiation. Determination is mesenchymal stem cells committing to the adipocyte precursor cells, also known as lipoblasts or preadipocytes which lose the potential to differentiate to other types of cells such as chondrocytes, myocytes, and osteoblasts. Terminal differentiation is that preadipocytes differentiate into mature adipocytes. Adipocytes can arise either from preadipocytes resident in adipose tissue, or from bone-marrow derived progenitor cells that migrate to adipose tissue.

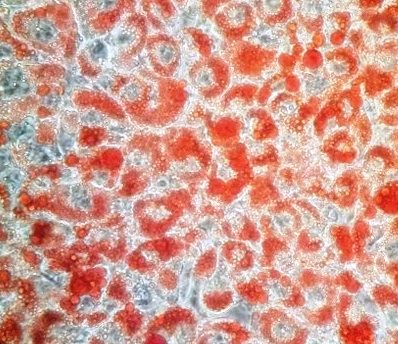
Differentiated Adipocyte stained with Oil Red O

== Introduction ==
Adipocytes play a vital role in energy homeostasis and process the largest energy reserve as triglycerides in the body. Adipocytes stay in a dynamic state, they start expanding when the energy intake is higher than the expenditure and undergo mobilization when the energy expenditure exceeds the intake. This process is highly regulated by counter regulatory hormones to which these cells are very sensitive. The hormone insulin promotes expansion whereas the counter hormones epinephrine, glucagon, and ACTH promote mobilization. Adipogenesis is a tightly regulated cellular differentiation process, in which mesenchymal stem cells committing to preadipocytes and preadipocytes differentiating into adipocytes. Cellular differentiation is a change of gene expression patterns which multipotent gene expression alters to cell type specific gene expression. Therefore, transcription factors are crucial for adipogenesis. Transcription factors, peroxis proliferator-activated receptor γ (PPARγ) and CCAAT enhancer-binding proteins (C/EBPs) are main regulators of adipogenesis. Comparing with cells from other lineage, the in vitro differentiation of fat cells is authentic and recapitulates most of the characteristic feature of in vivo differentiation. The key features of differentiated adipocytes are growth arrest, morphological change, high expression of lipogenic genes and production of adipokines like adiponectin, leptin, resistin (in the mouse, not in humans) and TNF-alpha.

== Differentiation ==
In vitro studies on differentiation have used the pre-committed preadipocyte lineage, such as 3T3-L1 and 3T3-F442A cell line, or preadipocytes isolated from the stromal-vascular fraction of white adipose tissue. In vitro differentiation is a highly ordered process. Firstly, proliferating preadipocytes arrest growth usually by contact inhibition. The growth arrest followed by the earliest events, including a morphological change of preadipocyte from the fibroblast-shape to the round-shape and the induction of transcription factors C/EBPβ, and C/EBPδ. The second phase of growth arrest is the expression of two key transcription factors PPARγ and C/EBPα which promote expression of genes that confer the characteristics of mature adipocytes. These genes include adipocyte protein (aP2), insulin receptor, glycerophosphate dehydrogenase, fatty acid synthase, acetyl CoA carboxylase, glucose transporter type 4 (Glut 4) and so on. Through this process, lipid droplets accumulate in the adipocyte. However, preadipocytes cell lines have difficulty differentiating into adipocytes. Preadipocytes display CD45^{−} CD31^{−} CD34^{+} CD29^{+} SCA1^{+} CD24^{+} surface markers can proliferate and differentiate to adipocytes in vivo.

=== Models of in vitro differentiation ===
Cell Line	Origin	Differentiation Protocol
Committed Pre-adipocytes		
3T3-L1	Sub-clone of Swiss 3T3	FBS+ I+ D+ M
3T3-F442A	Sub-clone of Swiss 3T3	FBS + I
Ob17	Differentiated adipocyte from epididymal fat pad of C57BL/6J ob/ob mice	FBS+ I+ T3
TA1	Subclone of C3H10T1/2	FBS + D + I
30A5	Subclone of C3H10T1/2	FBS + D + M + I
1246	Adipogenic Subclone of CH3 mouse teratocarcinoma cell line T984	D + M + I
Non-committed with adipogenic potential		
NIH3T3	NIH Swiss mouse embryo cells	Ectopic expression of PPAR-gamma, C/EBP-alpha or C/EBP-beta + D+ M+ I
Swiss 3T3	Swiss mouse embryo cells	Ectopic expression of C/EBP-alpha
Balb/3T3	Balb/c mouse embryo cells	Ectopic expression of C/EBP-alpha
C3H 10T1/2	C3H mouse embryo cells	PPAR-gamma ligand
Kusa 4b10	mouse bone marrow stromal cell line	FBS + I + D + M
C2C12	Thigh muscles of C3H mice	Thiazolidinediones
G8	Hind limb muscles of fetal Swiss webster mouse	Ectopic expression of PPAR-gamma + CEBP/alpha +D + I
FBS = Fetal Bovine Serum, D = Dexamethasone, I = Insulin, M = Methylisobutylxanthine T3 = Triiodothyronine		

== Transcriptional regulations ==
=== PPARγ ===
PPARγ is a member of the nuclear-receptor superfamily and is the master regulator of adipogenesis. PPARγ heterodimerizes with retinoid X receptor (RXR) and then binds to DNA, which activates the promoters of the downstream genes. PPARγ induces fat-cell specific genes, including aP2, adiponectin and phosphoenolpyruvate carboxykinase (PEPCK). PPARg activation has effects on several aspects of the mature adipocyte characteristics such as morphological changes, lipid accumulation, and the acquisition of insulin sensitivity. PPARγ is necessary and sufficient to promote fat cell differentiation. PPARγ is required for embryonic stem cells (ES cells) differentiation to adipocytes. The expression of PPARγ itself is sufficient to convert fibroblast into adipocytes in vitro. Other pro-adipogenic factors like C/EBPs and Krüppel-like factors (KLFs) have been shown to induce the PPARγ promoter. Moreover, PPARγ is also required to maintain the expression of genes that characterize the mature adipocyte. Thiazolidinediones (TZDs), antidiabetic agents which well used differentiation cocktail in vitro, promoting the activity of PPARγ.

=== C/EBPs ===
C/EBPs, transcription factors, are members of the basic-leucine zipper class. cAMP, an inducer of adipogenesis, can promote expression of C/EBPβ and C/EBPδ. At the early stage of differentiation, the transient increase of C/EBPβ and C/EBPδ mRNA and protein levels are thought to activate the adipogenic transcription factors, PPARγ and C/EBPα. PPARγ and C/EBPα can feedback to induce the expression of each other as well as their downstream genes. C/EBPα also plays an important role in the insulin sensitivity of adipocytes. However, C/EBPγ suppresses differentiation which might due to inactivation by C/EBPβ.

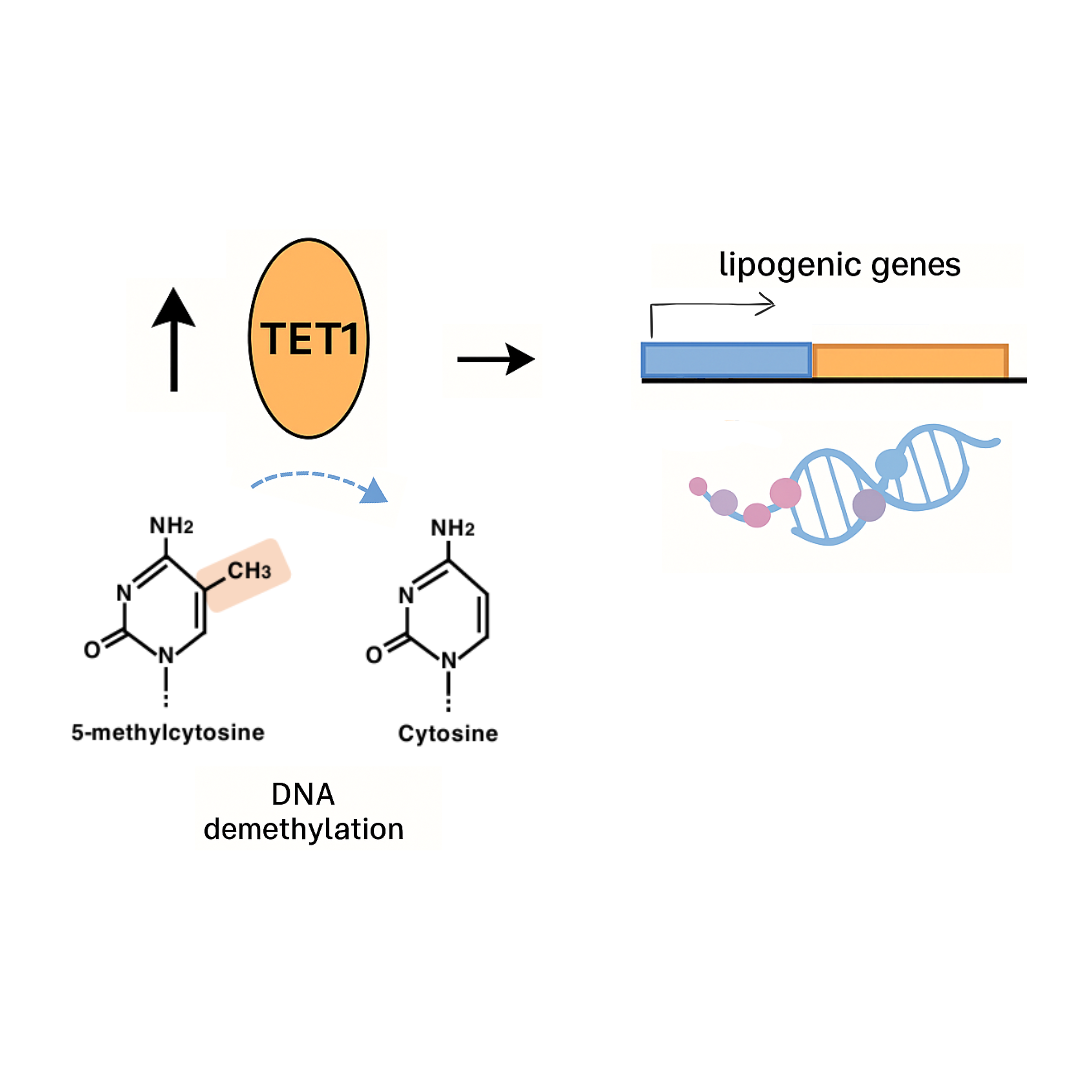
Epigenetic role of TET1 in adipogenesis

=== Transcriptional cascade ===
Although PPARγ and C/EBPα are master regulators of adipogenesis, other transcription factors function in the progression of differentiation. Adipocyte determination and differentiation factor 1 (ADD1) and sterol regulatory element binding protein 1 (SREBP1) can activate PPARγ by the production of an endogenous PPARγ ligand or directly promote the expression of PPARγ. cAMP-responsive element binding protein promotes differentiation, while the activation of PPARγ and C/EBPα is also responsive to negative regulation. T-cell factor/lymphoid enhancer-binding factor (TCF/LEF), GATA2/3, retinoic acid receptor α, and SMAD6/7 have no effect on the expression of C/EBPβ and C/EBPδ but inhibit the induction of PPARγ and C/EBPα.

=== Epigenetic regulation: TET1 ===
TET1 plays an important role in the early stages of adipogenesis. During this process, TET1 increases its expression and promotes DNA demethylation. This epigenetic modification facilitates the activation of genes required for adipocyte formation. In this way, TET1 helps progenitor cells change their identity and acquire the characteristics of mature adipocytes.

== Other regulations ==
Products of endocrine system such as insulin, IGF-1, cAMP, glucocorticoid, and triiodothyronine effectively induce adipogenesis in preadipocytes.

=== Insulin and IGF1 ===
Insulin regulates adipogenesis through insulin-like growth factor 1 (IGF1) receptor signaling. Insulin/IGF1 promotes the induction transcription factors regulating terminal differentiation.

=== Wnt signaling ===
Wnt/β-catenin signaling suppresses adipogenesis, by promoting the differentiation of mesenchymal stem cells into myocytes and osteocytes but blocking the commitment to the adipocytic lineage. Wnt/β-catenin inhibits the differentiation of preadipocytes by inhibiting the induction of PPARγ and C/EBPα.

=== BMPs ===
Bone morphogenetic proteins (BMPs) are transforming growth factor β (TGFβ) superfamily members. BMP2 can either stimulates the determination of multipotent cells or induce osteogenesis through different receptor heteromers. BMPs also promotes the differentiation of preadipocytes.

=== Senescent cells ===
Senescent adipose progenitor cells in subcutaneous adipose tissue has been shown to suppress adipogenic differentiation. Reduced adipogenesis in obese persons is due to increased senescent cells in adipose tissue rather than reduced numbers of stem/progenitor cells.
