= AAMDC =

Gene found in humans

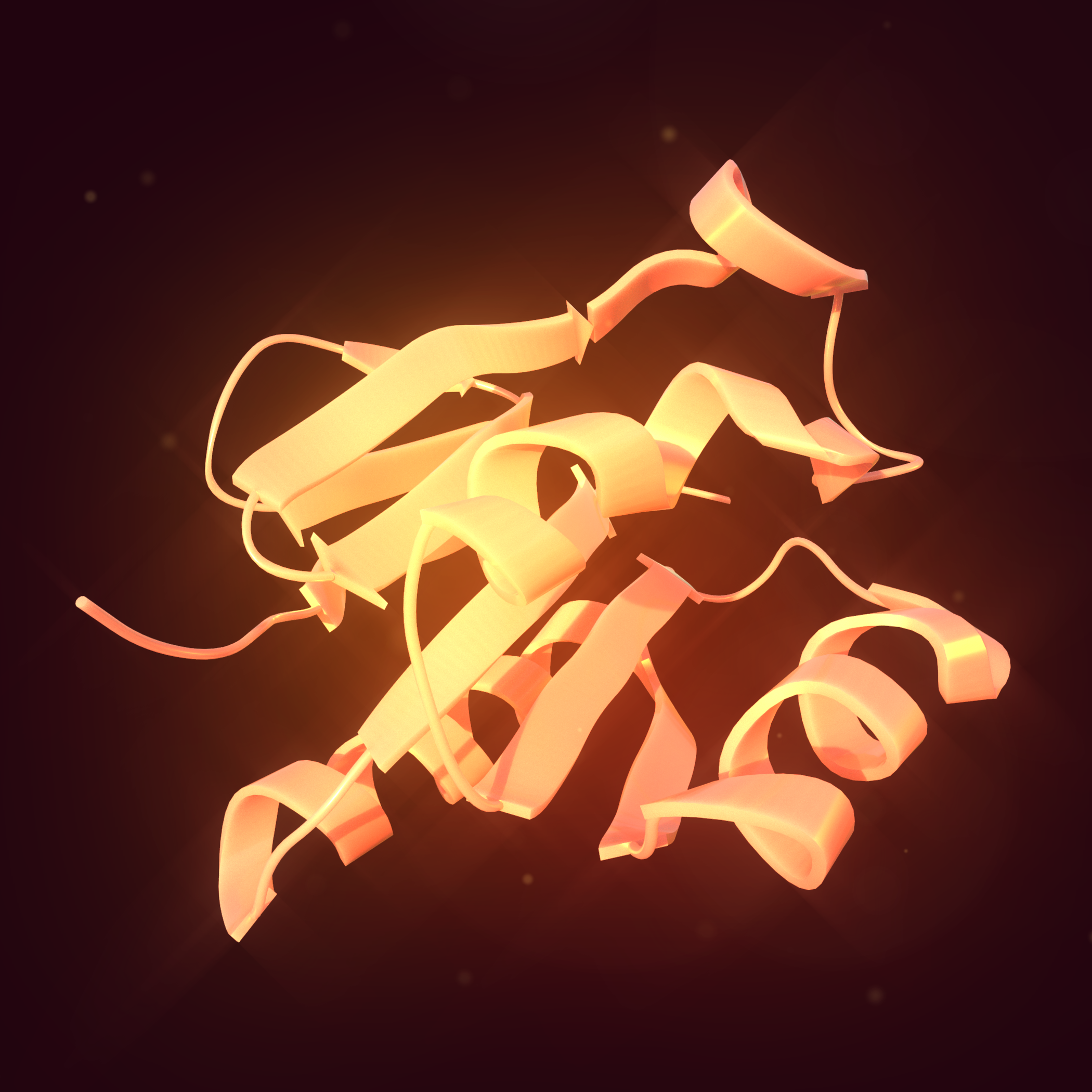

Identifiers
- Aliases: AAMDC, C11orf67, CK067, PTD015, adipogenesis associated, Mth938 domain containing, adipogenesis associated Mth938 domain containing
- External IDs: MGI: 1913523; GeneCards: AAMDC
Available structures
PDB	Ortholog search: PDBe RCSB
PDB	List of PDB id codes 2AB1, 2Q4Q

Gene location (Human)
Chr.	Chromosome 11 (human)
Band	11q14.1	Start	77,821,109 bp
Band	11q14.1	End	77,918,432 bp

Gene location (Mouse)
Chr.	Chromosome 7 (mouse)
Band	7|7 E1	Start	97,199,538 bp
Band	7|7 E1	End	97,228,704 bp
RNA expression pattern
Bgee	Human / Mouse (ortholog); Top expressed in: tendon of biceps brachii; muscle of thigh; apex of heart; vastus lateralis muscle; left adrenal cortex; right adrenal gland; right adrenal cortex; thoracic diaphragm; triceps brachii muscle; right auricle of heart / Top expressed in: triceps brachii muscle; temporal muscle; muscle of thigh; sternocleidomastoid muscle; masseter muscle; quadriceps femoris muscle; intercostal muscle; gastrocnemius muscle; tibialis anterior muscle; digastric muscle; More reference expression data
BioGPS	n/a
Gene ontology
Molecular function	protein binding
Cellular component	cytoplasm
Biological process	positive regulation of transcription by RNA polymerase II; positive regulation of fat cell differentiation; negative regulation of apoptotic process
Sources:Amigo / QuickGO
Orthologs
Databases	NCBI: entry; OMA: entry
Species	Human	Mouse
Entrez	28971	66273
Ensembl	ENSG00000087884	ENSMUSG00000035642
UniProt	Q9H7C9	Q8R0P4
RefSeq (mRNA)	NM_024684; NM_001316957; NM_001316958; NM_001316960; NM_001316961 NM_001316962; NM_001363564	NM_001177945; NM_001177946; NM_001177947; NM_183251
RefSeq (protein)	NP_001303886; NP_001303887; NP_001303889; NP_001303890; NP_001303891 NP_078960; NP_001350493	NP_001171416; NP_001171417; NP_001171418; NP_899074
Location (UCSC)	Chr 11: 77.82 – 77.92 Mb	Chr 7: 97.2 – 97.23 Mb
PubMed search
- Wikidata
View/Edit Human	View/Edit Mouse

The AAMDC gene encodes an AMDC or Adipogenesis Associated Mth938 Domain Containing protein that is integral to various cellular processes. The protein is involved in lipid metabolism, specifically adipogenesis, and plays a role in signal transduction as an oncoprotein.

The AAMDC protein is found in both the cytoplasmic and nuclear compartments of the cell.
