= 3T3 cells =

Cell lines of mouse embryonic fibroblasts

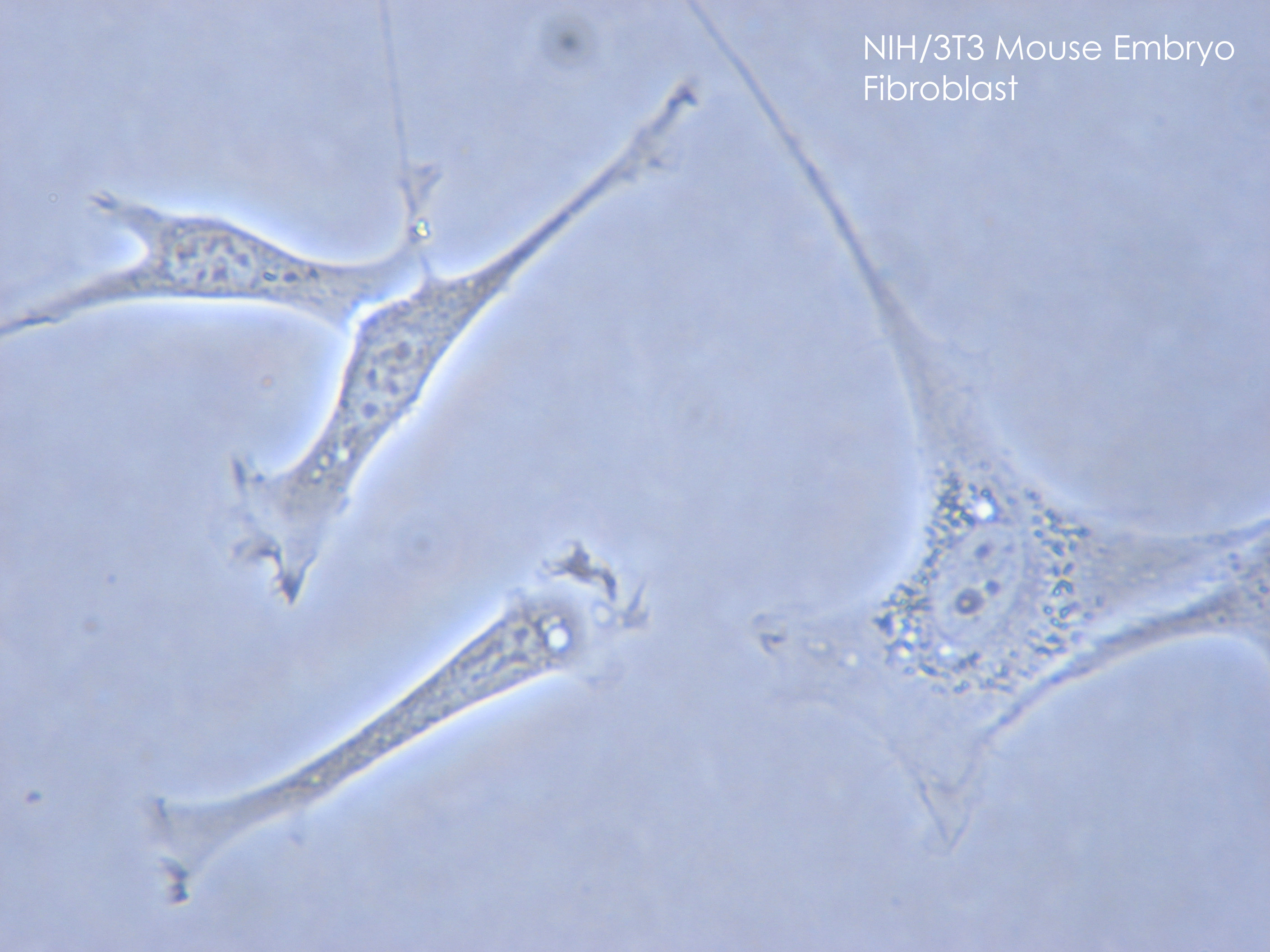
NIH-3T3 fibroblasts in cell culture

3T3 cells are several cell lines of mouse embryonic fibroblasts. The original 3T3 cell line (3T3-Swiss albino) was established in 1962 by two scientists then at the Department of Pathology in the New York University School of Medicine, George Todaro and Howard Green. Todaro and Green originally obtained their 3T3 cells from Swiss albino mouse embryo tissue. Later, as a principal investigator position at the National Cancer Institute in Bethesda, Maryland, Todaro repeated the isolation procedure from the NIH Swiss mouse embryo with his students and established NIH-3T3 cell line.

3T3 cells are a well-known line of immortalized mouse fibroblasts that were established in 1963 by George Todaro and Howard Green. They are among the most widely used cell lines in biological research and serve as one of the model systems for studying cell proliferation, cancer transformation, and adipocyte differentiation. Over the decades, 3T3 cells have given rise to multiple different sublines such as NIH-3T3, 3T3-Swiss albino, and 3T3-L1 that each have specialized application in different branches of cell and molecular biology.

== Nomenclature ==
The '3T3' designation refers to the abbreviation of "3-day transfer, inoculum 3×10^{5} cells." This cell line was originally established from the primary mouse embryonic fibroblast cells that were cultured by the designated protocol, so-called '3T3 protocol'. The primary mouse embryonic fibroblast cells were transferred (the "T") every 3 days (the first "3"), and inoculated at the rigid density of 3×10^{5} cells per 20 cm^{2} dish (the second "3") continuously. The spontaneously immortalized cells with stable growth rate were established after 20 to 30 generations in culture, and then named '3T3' cells. Since then, several cell lines have been established with this procotol:

- 3T3-Swiss albino, the original 1962 cell line
  - 3T3-J2, a subclone of 3T3-Swiss albino, commonly used as feeders for keratinocyte cultures
  - 3T3-L1, a subclone of 3T3-Swiss albino, used as a model of adipogenesis
- NIH-3T3, also from Swiss albino mice
- BALB/c-3T3 clone A31, from BALB/c mice

== Characteristics ==
3T3 cells are adherent fibroblasts that display the classic elongated, spindle-shaped morphology that is normal for connective tissue cells. They attach firmly to plastic or glass culture surfaces and proliferate in a monolayer until they reach confluence, or when their growth slows due to contact inhibition. These cells are known for their stable karyotype, predictable growth rate, and ease of handling when used in culture. They have a doubling time of approximately 20-24 hours under optimal conditions and are able to be passaged continuously for an almost indefinite period of time. 3T3 cells are also highly transfectable, meaning they readily take up foreign DNA. This is a property that has made them a preferred host for molecular cloning, oncogene studies, and transfection-based assays. Also, because 3T3 fibroblasts originated from normal embryonic tissue rather than tumors, they provided one of the first normal diploid cell systems for transformation assay. Researchers were able to compare normal fibroblast behavior with transformed or cancerous derivatives to explore mechanisms and traits of oncogenesis.

Swiss 3T3 can be inhibited by temazepam and other benzodiazepines. These cells are also contact inhibited. The cells are sensitive to sarcoma virus and leukemia virus focus formation. 3T3 cells can be transformed with SV40 and some other polyomaviruses.

=== Culture characteristics ===
Adherent cells grow as a monolayer. A confluent monolayer yields 40,000 cells/cm^{2}.

=== Expression ===
Lysophosphatidylcholine (lyso-PC) induces AP-1 activity and c-Jun N-terminal kinase activity (JNK1) by a protein kinase C-independent pathway.

=== Cytogenetics ===
3T3 mouse cells are hypertriploid. The modal chromosome number is 68, which occurs in 30% of cells. Higher ploidies occur at a much lower rate of 2.4%.

== History and origin ==
The 3T3 cell line was developed by George Todaro and Howard Green at the National Institutes of Health (NIH) in 1963. The name ‘3T3’ refers to the culture protocol they devised, which was transferring (trypsinizing) and reseeding cells every three days at a constant density of 3 x 105 cells per 20 cm2 dish. This regular subculturing method prevented overgrowth and maintained the cells in a balanced and proliferative condition. In their paper, Todaro and Green demonstrated that repeated passage within these controlled conditions was able to produce a stable, immortalized line of mouse embryonic fibroblasts that could grow indefinitely in culture without senescence or deterioration (Todaro & Green, 1963).

This 3T3 protocol was one of the first systematic methods for establishing a permanent mammalian cell line and set a precedent for cell culture techniques today. The original strain, which is now called 3T3-Swiss albino, was derived from Swiss mouse embryos. This parent line later served as the foundation for several other sublines, including the NIH-3T3 that eventually became one of the most popular fibroblast models in laboratories worldwide.

== Subtypes and derivatives ==
Over time, several subtypes or derivative lines of 3T3 cells have been created and adapted for distinct experimental purposes.

3T3-Swiss albino (CCL-92)
This is the original parent line that was deposited by Howard Green. It retains the basic fibroblast morphology and is commonly used as a standard control in cell growth and studies on transformation.
NIH-3T3 (CRL-1658)
This subtype was derived from the original 3T3-Swiss population at the National Institutes of Health and exhibits a slightly different growth rate and chromosomal stability. NIH-3T3 cells are very responsive to transformation by viral or chemical oncogenes and are often used in focus-formation assays, transfection experiments, and cancer biology research.
3T3-L1
This derivative was selected from 3T3 fibroblasts for its ability to differentiate into adipocytes, or fat cells, under specific hormonal conditions. Upon induction with certain agents such as insulin and dexamethasone, 3T3-L1 cells undergo a detailed process of adipogenesis and ultimately accumulate lipid droplets and express fat specific genes. Today, 3T3-L1 cells are a standard in vitro model for studying adipocyte biology, obesity, and metabolic regulation.

Each subline maintains fibroblast-like properties but varies in growth characteristics, genetic stability, and differentiation potential. This allows researchers to select the most appropriate model for their specific research studies.

== Research applications ==
3T3 cells and their derivatives have had a profound influence on multiple different fields of biology and medicine. Their ease in culturing, defined behavior, and adaptability make them ideal for many different applications in research.

Cancer and Transformation Studies
Since NIH-3T3 fibroblasts are non-tumorigenic under normal conditions but can be transformed by oncogenes, they are a strong model for studying cell transformation and oncogene function. For instance, the introduction of viral or human oncogenes into NIH-3T3 cells induces visible morphological changes and tumor-like cells and helps to define the molecular basis of cancer. Recent studies continue to explore how genetic instability influences transformation in NIH-3T3 derivative.
Cell Growth and Signal Transduction
The original 3T3 line remains very valuable for general cell biology research involving proliferation, contact inhibition, and signal transduction. Since the line exhibits consistent responses to growth factors and cytokines, it has been used in order to analyze different pathways like MAPK, PI3K/Akt, and TGF-𝛽 signaling.
Adipogenesis and Metabolic Research
3T3-L1 adipocytes are arguably one of the best in vitro models for studying adipocyte differentiation, lipid metabolism, and endocrine function of fat cells. They have been useful in identifying transcriptional regulators such as PPAR𝛾 and C/EBP⍺, which coordinate the gene expression within adipogenesis. Modern studies use 3T3-L1 sublines in order to model obesity-related changes in lipid storage and adipokine secretion. For example, maintaining differentiated 3T3-L1 MBX adipocytes in fatty-acid enriched media induces an ‘obese’ phenotype with an increased amount of lipid accumulation and altered metabolic signaling (Mubtasim & Gollahon, 2023). These models are vital in testing anti-obesity drugs and understanding metabolic disorders.
Tissue Engineering and Regenerative Research
Due to their nature as fibroblasts, 3T3 cells are often employed as feeder layers to support the growth of more sensitive and specialized cells such as keratinocytes and embryonic stem cells. Their stable monolayers are able to provide extracellular matrix support and growth factors, which promote the proliferation of the cells that are cultured with them. This role is especially helpful in regenerative medicine and tissue-engineering applications.

== Modern developments ==
Despite being over 60 years old, the 3T3 lineage remains widely used and embedded into cell biology research. Advances in molecular profiling, genome editing, and live-cell imaging continue to show new aspects of this classic fibroblast model. Recent work has focused on genetic and phenotypic evolution within long-term cultures of 3T3 cells. For example, in a 2025 study by Zhang et al. a new cell line derived from NIH-3T3 fibroblasts exhibited early transformation markers, oncogenic mutations, and autophagy pathway dependency for survival. These findings illustrate how even stable cell lines have the ability to acquire novel traits under long-term culture, which further supports the importance of monitoring cell line identity and genetic drift.

At the same time, research using 3T3-L1 and related sublines continues to expand into new areas of metabolic disease and signal transduction. For example, omics analyses now map the transcriptional networks that govern adipogenesis and lipid metabolism. This helps to combine cell culture studies with clinical insights into obesity and diabetes. The persistence of 3T3 cells in modern research highlights their adaptability as experimental tools. Whether they are used in molecular biology, oncology, or metabolic physiology, these fibroblasts are a fundamental resource for learning and observing cell behavior and mechanisms.
