= Mir-872 microRNA precursor family =

mir-872

Identifiers
- Symbol: mir-872
- Rfam: RF00918
- miRBase family: MIPF0000399

Other data
- RNA type: microRNA
- Domain(s): Eukaryota;
- PDB structures: PDBe

In molecular biology mir-872 microRNA is a short RNA molecule. MicroRNAs function to regulate the expression levels of other genes by several mechanisms.

== Sertoli Cell Expression ==
miR-872 has been found to be expressed in sertoli cells and to post-transcriptionally target the Sod-1 gene, which encodes the copper/zinc-binding superoxide dismutase 1 (SOD-1) enzyme. Overproduction of SOD-1 increases oxidative damage and through this results in enhanced apoptosis and cell death.

== Insulin-regulated HO-1 expression ==
Insulin infusion in rats has seen increased levels of heme-oxygenase 1 expression, blocked by inhibited activation of PI3K or protein kinase C. miR-872 levels are reduced with inhibition of adipocytes of the 3T3-L1 cell line, along with those of miRNAs-155 and -183. Insulin is therefore able to increase expression of HO-1 through miR-872 downregulation, as well as via pathways dependent upon PI3K and protein kinase C.

== See also ==
- MicroRNA
