= CEBPB =

Protein-coding gene in humans

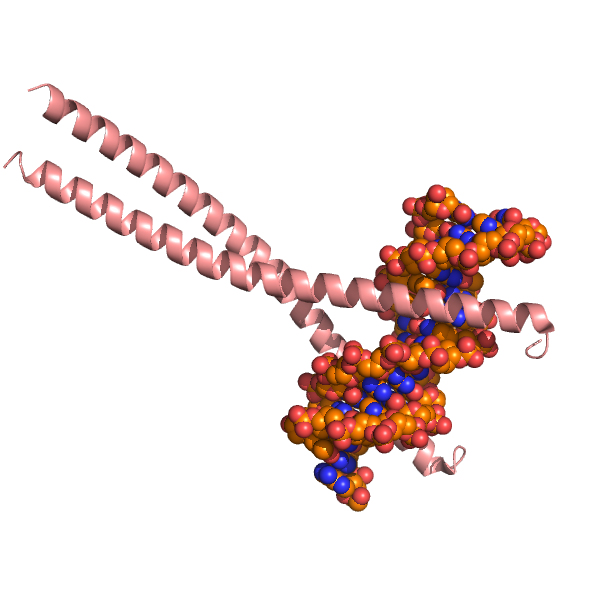

Identifiers
- Aliases: CEBPB, C/EBP-beta, IL6DBP, NF-IL6, TCF5, CCAAT/enhancer binding protein beta, CCAAT enhancer binding protein beta
- External IDs: OMIM: 189965; MGI: 88373; GeneCards: CEBPB
Available structures
PDB	Ortholog search: PDBe RCSB
PDB	List of PDB id codes 1GTW, 1GU4, 1GU5, 1H88, 1H89, 1H8A, 1HJB, 1IO4, 2E42, 2E43

Gene location (Human)
Chr.	Chromosome 20 (human)
Band	20q13.13	Start	50,190,830 bp
Band	20q13.13	End	50,192,668 bp

Gene location (Mouse)
Chr.	Chromosome 2 (mouse)
Band	2 H3|2 87.58 cM	Start	167,530,835 bp
Band	2 H3|2 87.58 cM	End	167,532,338 bp
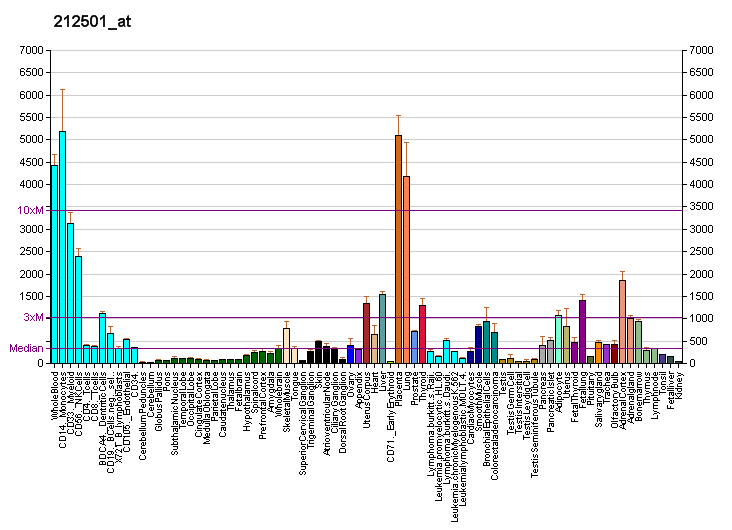
RNA expression pattern
Bgee	Human / Mouse (ortholog); Top expressed in: lower lobe of lung; pericardium; periodontal fiber; vena cava; mucosa of paranasal sinus; nipple; lactiferous duct; skin of thigh; tibialis anterior muscle; skin of arm / Top expressed in: granulocyte; stroma of bone marrow; hair follicle; left lung lobe; brown adipose tissue; decidua; gastrula; temporal muscle; right lung lobe; left lobe of liver; More reference expression data
BioGPS	More reference expression data
Gene ontology
Molecular function	DNA binding; sequence-specific DNA binding; RNA polymerase II transcription regulatory region sequence-specific DNA binding; protein homodimerization activity; DNA-binding transcription factor activity; DNA-binding transcription activator activity, RNA polymerase II-specific; transcription factor binding; histone deacetylase binding; chromatin binding; RNA polymerase II cis-regulatory region sequence-specific DNA binding; kinase binding; protein binding; histone acetyltransferase binding; ubiquitin-like protein ligase binding; protein heterodimerization activity; transcription factor activity, RNA polymerase II distal enhancer sequence-specific binding; RNA polymerase II core promoter sequence-specific DNA binding; DNA-binding transcription repressor activity, RNA polymerase II-specific; DNA-binding transcription factor activity, RNA polymerase II-specific; glucocorticoid receptor binding
Cellular component	cytoplasm; nuclear matrix; CHOP-C/EBP complex; nucleoplasm; nucleus; condensed chromosome, centromeric region; RNA polymerase II transcription regulator complex
Biological process	negative regulation of neuron apoptotic process; mammary gland epithelial cell proliferation; cell differentiation; regulation of transcription, DNA-templated; positive regulation of transcription from RNA polymerase II promoter in response to endoplasmic reticulum stress; cellular response to organic cyclic compound; embryonic placenta development; memory; positive regulation of interleukin-4 production; response to endoplasmic reticulum stress; mammary gland epithelial cell differentiation; transcription, DNA-templated; positive regulation of transcription, DNA-templated; negative regulation of T cell proliferation; liver regeneration; positive regulation of osteoblast differentiation; hepatocyte proliferation; response to lipopolysaccharide; regulation of osteoclast differentiation; defense response to bacterium; acute-phase response; immune response; neuron differentiation; cellular response to interleukin-1; brown fat cell differentiation; cellular response to amino acid stimulus; ovarian follicle development; liver development; inflammatory response; negative regulation of transcription, DNA-templated; positive regulation of fat cell differentiation; cellular response to lipopolysaccharide; fat cell differentiation; positive regulation of transcription by RNA polymerase II; intrinsic apoptotic signaling pathway in response to endoplasmic reticulum stress; transcription by RNA polymerase II; granuloma formation; T-helper 1 cell activation; negative regulation of transcription by RNA polymerase II; regulation of odontoblast differentiation; positive regulation of biomineral tissue development; positive regulation of sodium-dependent phosphate transport; positive regulation of inflammatory response; positive regulation of cold-induced thermogenesis; regulation of dendritic cell differentiation
Sources:Amigo / QuickGO
Orthologs
Databases	NCBI: entry; OMA: entry
Species	Human	Mouse
Entrez	1051	12608
Ensembl	ENSG00000172216	ENSMUSG00000056501
UniProt	P17676	P28033
RefSeq (mRNA)	NM_005194; NM_001285878; NM_001285879	NM_001287738; NM_001287739; NM_009883
RefSeq (protein)	NP_001272807; NP_001272808; NP_005185	NP_001274667; NP_001274668; NP_034013
Location (UCSC)	Chr 20: 50.19 – 50.19 Mb	Chr 2: 167.53 – 167.53 Mb
PubMed search
- Wikidata
View/Edit Human	View/Edit Mouse

CCAAT/enhancer-binding protein beta is a protein that in humans is encoded by the CEBPB gene.

== Function ==
The protein encoded by this intronless gene is a bZIP transcription factor that can bind as a homodimer to certain DNA regulatory regions. It can also form heterodimers with the related proteins CEBP-alpha, CEBP-delta, and CEBP-gamma. The encoded protein is important in the regulation of genes involved in immune and inflammatory responses and has been shown to bind to the IL-1 response element in the IL-6 gene, as well as to regulatory regions of several acute-phase and cytokine genes. In addition, the encoded protein can bind the promoter and upstream element and stimulate the expression of the collagen type I gene.

CEBP-beta is critical for normal macrophage functioning, an important immune cell sub-type; mice unable to express CEBP-beta have macrophages that cannot differentiate (specialize) and thus are unable to perform all their biological functions—including macrophage-mediated muscle repair. Observational work has shown that expression of CEBP-beta in blood leukocytes is positively associated with muscle strength in humans, emphasizing the importance of the immune system, and particularly macrophages, in the maintenance of muscle function.

Function of CEBPB gene can be effectively examined by siRNA knockdown based on an independent validation.

Upon further investigation, it was noted that CEBPB has close to 8,600 similar correlations with biological manipulations ranging from molecules to proteins or abstracted microRNAs. This protein is found in blood and is upregulated in diseases by acute myeloid leukemia, Glioma, and prostate cancer. This idea is predicated in an intracellular location and precisely localized to the nucleoplasm.

== Target genes ==
CEBPB is capable of increasing the expression of several target genes. Among them, some have specific role in the nervous system such as the preprotachykinin-1 gene, giving rise to substance P and neurokinin A and the choline acetyltransferase responsible for the biosynthesis of the important neurotransmitter acetylcholine. Other targets include genes coding for cytokines such as IL-6, IL-4, IL-5, and TNF-alpha. Genes coding for transporter proteins that confer multidrug resistance to the cells have also been found to be activated by CEBPB. Such genes include ABCC2 and ABCB1.

== Enhancer Binding-Protein ==
The CEBPB gene encodes a transcription factor. As previously mentioned, "It contains a leucine zipper (bZIP) domain and the encoded protein functions as a homodimer. It can also form heterodimers with enhancer-binding proteins such as alpha, delta, and gamma. The activity of this protein is important in regulating genes involving the immune and inflammatory responses, among other processes. The "AUG" start codons, resulting in multiple protein isoforms". It was also mentioned that each of these codon has a different biological function in the body.

This pathway allows for proliferation, inhibition, and even survival. This gene is a vital part of proliferation and segregation. It's important "as the transcription factor regulates the expression of genes that are involved in the immune and inflammatory response, it includes the gluconeogenic pathway and liver recovery. It has a probiotic effect on many cell types, like hepatocytes and adipocytes. However, it exerts differential "effects on T cells by inhibiting MYC expression and promoting differentiation of the T helper lineage." It binds to the regulatory regions of several phase and cytokine genes".

== Cancer ==
CEBPB is a type of CEBP transcript. CEBPB gene is noted in macrophages in SKCM and provides a favorable prognosis with metastatic cancer by being a biomarker for the patient's diagnosis stratification. Through integrated analysis of single-cell and bulk RNA-sequence datasets. Since CEBPB is a transcription factor in regulating gene expression, patients with metastatic melanoma may benefit long-term by blocking proteins such as CTLA-4 Other. Any other pathway of immune activation, such as targeting CEBPB. It is widely expressed in several different cancers.

== Interactions ==
CEBPB has been shown to interact with:

- CREB1,
- CRSP3
- DNA damage-inducible transcript 3,
- EP300,
- Estrogen receptor alpha,
- Glucocorticoid receptor,
- HMGA1,
- HSF1,
- Nucleolar phosphoprotein p130,
- RELA,
- Serum response factor,
- SMARCA2,
- Sp1 transcription factor,
- TRIM28, and
- Zif268.

== See also ==
- Ccaat-enhancer-binding proteins
