= Pantheric acids =

Group of organic chemical compounds

Pantheric acids are a group of organic chemical compounds consisting of fatty acids with long carbon chains, isolated from natural sources, primarily from toadstools of the genus Amanita, specifically Amanita pantherina.

On the whole, little is known about the toxicity of pantheric acids, which directly influence the toxicity of panthera amanita, although it is undisputed that they have been isolated from the fruiting body of A. pantherina in the form of three related compounds designated by the letters (pantheric acids A–C); all compounds contributed to an increase in lipid droplets in 3T3-L1 adipocytes and altered lipid metabolism by inducing lipogenesis and inhibiting lipolysis. It has been suggested that pantheric acids A and C from the poisonous mushroom may have a potentially adverse effect on lipid metabolism, although this requires further investigation.

== Chemical structures ==
Pantheric acid A

Pantheric acid B

Pantheric acid C
