= Specific granule =

Secretory vesicles within the immune system

Specific granules are secretory vesicles found exclusively in cells of the immune system called granulocytes.

It is sometimes described as applying specifically to neutrophils, and sometimes the term is applied to other types of cells.

These granules store a mixture of cytotoxic molecules, including many enzymes and antimicrobial peptides, that are released by a process called degranulation following activation of the granulocyte by an immune stimulus.

Specific granules are also known as "secondary granules".

== Contents ==
Examples of cytotoxic molecule stored by specific granules in different granulocytes include:

- Neutrophil: alkaline phosphatase, lactoferrin, lysozyme, NADPH oxidase
- Eosinophil: cathepsin, major basic protein
- Basophil: heparin, histamine (not directly cytotoxic)

== Clinical significance ==
A specific granule deficiency can be associated with CEBPE.
