= Neutrophil-specific granule deficiency =

Neutrophil-specific granule deciciency
- Other names: SGD
- Specialty: Immunology

Neutrophil-specific granule deficiency (previously known as lactoferrin deficiency) is a rare congenital immunodeficiency characterized by an increased risk for pyogenic infections due to defective production of specific granules and gelatinase granules in patient neutrophils.

== Symptoms and signs ==
Atypical infections are the key clinical manifestation of SGD. Within the first few years of life, patients will experience repeated pyogenic infections by species such as Staphylococcus aureus, Pseudomonas aeruginosa or other Enterobacteriaceae, and Candida albicans. Cutaneous ulcers or abscesses and pneumonia and chronic lung disease are common. Patients may also develop sepsis, mastoiditis, otitis media, and lymphadenopathy. Infants may present with vomiting, diarrhea, and failure to thrive.

Diagnosis can be made based upon CEBPE gene mutation or a pathognomonic finding of a blood smear showing lack of specific granules. Neutrophils and eosinophils will contain hyposegmented nuclei (a pseudo-Pelger–Huet anomaly).

== Genetics ==
A majority of patients with SGD have been found to have mutations in the CEBPE (CCAAT/enhancer-binding protein epsilon) gene, a transcription factor primarily active in myeloid cells. Almost all patients have been found to be homozygous for the mutation, suggesting the disease is autosomal recessive. One patient, heterozygous for the mutation, was found to be deficient in GFI1, a related gene.

== Pathophysiology ==
The defect in CEBPE appears to block the ability of neutrophils to mature past the promyelocyte stage in bone marrow. Since specific (secondary) and gelatinase (tertiary) granules are only produced past the promyelocyte stage of development, these are deficient in SGD. Lactoferrin is the major enzyme found in specific granules, and will be largely absent in the granulocytes of these patients, along with defensins (despite these also being found in azurophilic (primary) granules). The other major components of azurophilic granules, such as lysozyme, cathepsin, and elastase will be normal, however a lack of defensins and lactoferrin drastically weakens the neutrophil innate ability to fight infection. Neutrophils will also display abnormal chemotaxis, such as a decreased response to fMLP, due to a lack of chemotactic receptors typically found in the specific granules.

== Diagnosis ==
Diagnosis of SGD can be done using light microscopy, as Wright's stained neutrophils will not show secondary granules.

== Treatment ==
Treatment consists mainly of high dose antibiotics for active infections and prophylactic antibiotics for prevention of future infections. GM-CSF therapy or bone marrow transplant might be considered for severe cases. Prognosis is difficult to predict, but patients receiving treatment are generally able to survive to adulthood.

== Epidemiology ==
Estimation of the frequency of SGD is difficult, as it is an extremely rare disease with few cases reported in literature. The condition was first reported in 1980, and since only a handful more cases have been published.
