= CNTNAP2 =

Protein-coding gene in humans

Identifiers
- Aliases: CNTNAP2, AUTS15, CASPR2, CDFE, NRXN4, PTHSL1, contactin associated protein-like 2, contactin associated protein like 2, contactin associated protein 2
- External IDs: OMIM: 604569; MGI: 1914047; HomoloGene: 69159; GeneCards: CNTNAP2; OMA:CNTNAP2 - orthologs

Gene location (Human)
Chr.	Chromosome 7 (human)
Band	7q35-q36.1	Start	146,116,002 bp
Band	7q35-q36.1	End	148,420,998 bp

Gene location (Mouse)
Chr.	Chromosome 6 (mouse)
Band	6|6 B2.2- B2.3	Start	45,036,291 bp
Band	6|6 B2.2- B2.3	End	47,281,147 bp
RNA expression pattern
Bgee	Human / Mouse (ortholog); Top expressed in: corpus callosum; superior frontal gyrus; C1 segment; primary visual cortex; prefrontal cortex; Brodmann area 9; ganglionic eminence; right frontal lobe; anterior cingulate cortex; substantia nigra / Top expressed in: substantia nigra; vestibular membrane of cochlear duct; retinal pigment epithelium; molar; lateral hypothalamus; habenula; olfactory tubercle; transitional epithelium of urinary bladder; motor neuron; nucleus accumbens; More reference expression data
BioGPS	n/a
Gene ontology
Molecular function	enzyme binding; protein binding
Cellular component	perikaryon; Golgi apparatus; cell projection; cell surface; soma; dendrite; early endosome; axolemma; juxtaparanode region of axon; integral component of membrane; membrane; axon; voltage-gated potassium channel complex; cell junction; paranodal junction
Biological process	clustering of voltage-gated potassium channels; thalamus development; transmission of nerve impulse; limbic system development; learning; neuron recognition; vocal learning; brain development; vocalization behavior; cell adhesion; adult behavior; cerebral cortex development; social behavior; superior temporal gyrus development; neuron projection development; striatum development; protein localization to juxtaparanode region of axon; neuron projection morphogenesis
Sources:Amigo / QuickGO
Orthologs
Species	Human	Mouse
Entrez	26047	66797
Ensembl	ENSG00000174469; ENSG00000278728	ENSMUSG00000039419
UniProt	Q9UHC6	Q9CPW0
RefSeq (mRNA)	NM_014141	NM_001004357; NM_025771
RefSeq (protein)	NP_054860	NP_001004357; NP_080047
Location (UCSC)	Chr 7: 146.12 – 148.42 Mb	Chr 6: 45.04 – 47.28 Mb
PubMed search
- Wikidata
View/Edit Human	View/Edit Mouse

Contactin-associated protein-like 2 is a protein that in humans is encoded by the CNTNAP2 gene.

This gene encodes a member of the neurexin family which functions in the vertebrate nervous system as cell adhesion molecules and receptors. This protein, like other neurexin proteins, contains epidermal growth factor repeats and laminin G domains. In addition, it includes an F5/8 type C domain, discoidin/neuropilin- and fibrinogen-like domains, thrombospondin N-terminal-like domains and a putative PDZ binding site. This protein is localized at the juxtaparanodes of myelinated axons and associated with potassium channels. It may play a role in the local differentiation of the axon into distinct functional subdomains. This gene encompasses almost 1.6% of chromosome 7 and is one of the largest genes in the human genome. It may represent a positional candidate gene for the DFNB13 form of nonsyndromic deafness.

== Clinical significance ==
CNTNAP2 has been associated with autism spectrum disorder but accounts for very few cases. A large study concluded it is unlikely to be a primary risk gene for psychiatric disorders. CNTNAP2 may also be related to a disorder called specific language impairment.

Homozygous and compound heterozygous mutations in CNTNAP2 result in a disorder that resembles Pitt–Hopkins syndrome.

== Interactions ==
CNTNAP2 has been shown to interact with CNTN2.

== See also ==
- Brett Abrahams, geneticist and neuroscientist
