= Brett Abrahams =

American geneticist

Brett Abrahams (born March 3, 1973) is an American geneticist and neuroscientist involved in the identification and subsequent functional characterization of the autism-related gene CNTNAP2 at UCLA. Abrahams is an assistant professor at the Albert Einstein College of Medicine in New York City.

Publications in scientific journals including Cell, Nature, New England Journal of Medicine, together with reviews in Nature Reviews Genetics and the textbook Human Genetics: Problems & Approaches, have been cited by others over 2,000 times.

Work Abrahams has contributed to has made the Autism Speaks "Top Ten Research Advances" list in each of 2008, 2009, 2010, and 2011.
