= NFYB =

Protein-coding gene in the species Homo sapiens

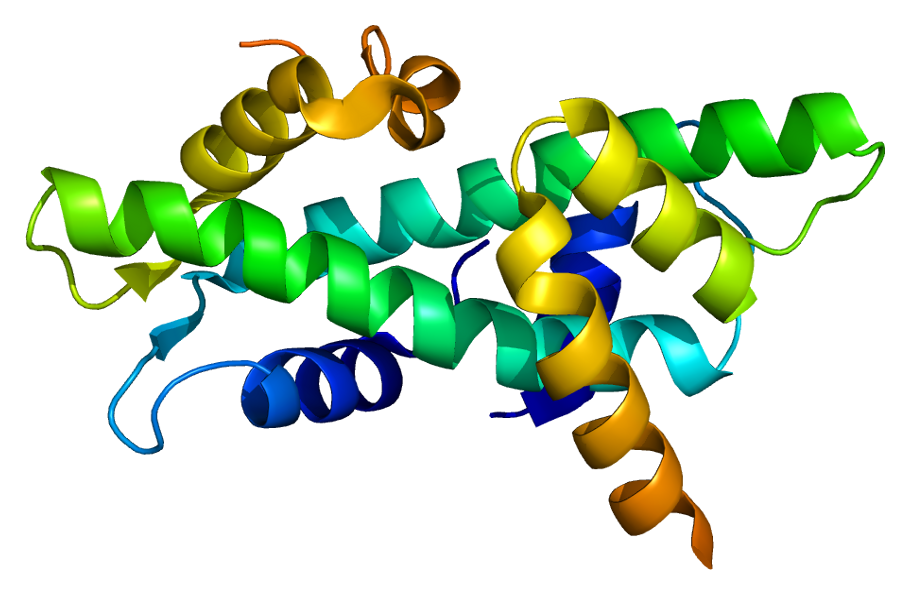

Identifiers
- Aliases: NFYB, CBF-A, CBF-B, HAP3, NF-YB, nuclear transcription factor Y subunit beta
- External IDs: OMIM: 189904; MGI: 97317; GeneCards: NFYB
Available structures
PDB	Ortholog search: PDBe RCSB
PDB	List of PDB id codes 1N1J, 4AWL, 4CSR

Gene location (Human)
Chr.	Chromosome 12 (human)
Band	12q23.3	Start	104,117,086 bp
Band	12q23.3	End	104,138,241 bp

Gene location (Mouse)
Chr.	Chromosome 10 (mouse)
Band	10 C1|10 40.25 cM	Start	82,584,535 bp
Band	10 C1|10 40.25 cM	End	82,599,978 bp
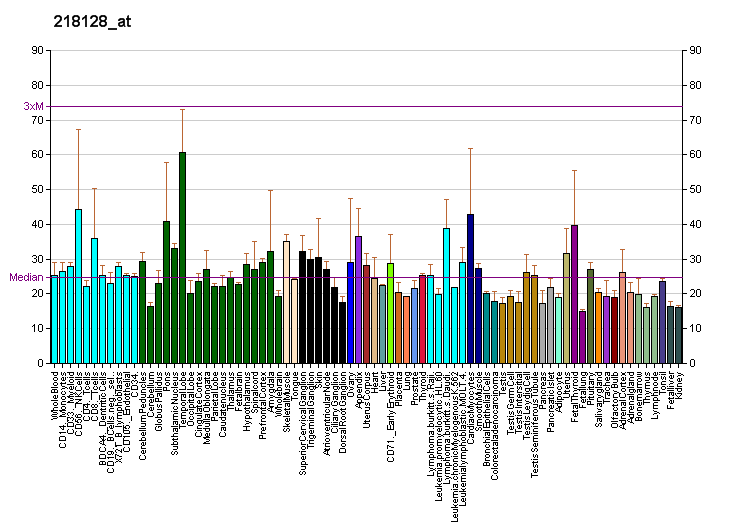

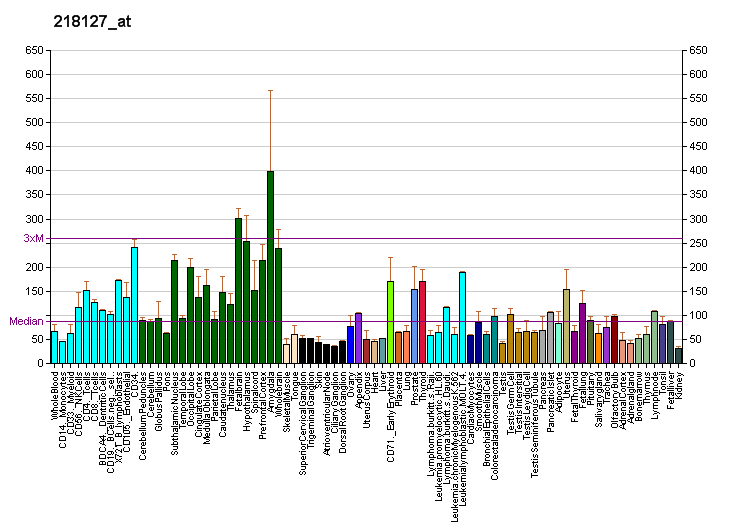

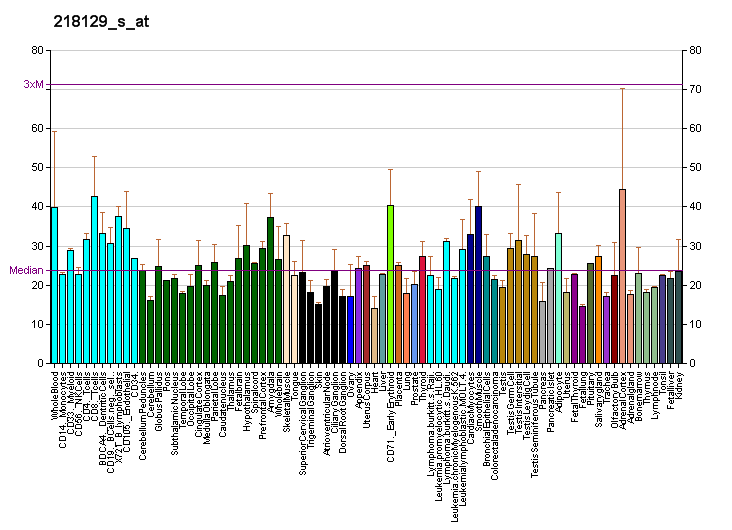
RNA expression pattern
Bgee	Human / Mouse (ortholog); Top expressed in: ganglionic eminence; Achilles tendon; ventricular zone; endothelial cell; right coronary artery; seminal vesicula; left coronary artery; tibial arteries; Descending thoracic aorta; muscle layer of sigmoid colon / Top expressed in: primitive streak; epiblast; ganglionic eminence; saccule; otic vesicle; embryo; ventricular zone; maxillary prominence; Rostral migratory stream; Region I of hippocampus proper; More reference expression data
BioGPS	More reference expression data
Gene ontology
Molecular function	DNA-binding transcription factor activity; sequence-specific DNA binding; protein binding; protein heterodimerization activity; DNA binding; RNA polymerase II cis-regulatory region sequence-specific DNA binding; DNA-binding transcription factor activity, RNA polymerase II-specific; protein-containing complex binding
Cellular component	protein-DNA complex; nucleoplasm; CCAAT-binding factor complex; nucleus; RNA polymerase II transcription regulator complex
Biological process	positive regulation of transcription, DNA-templated; transcription, DNA-templated; regulation of transcription, DNA-templated; regulation of cholesterol biosynthetic process; cellular response to leukemia inhibitory factor; regulation of transcription by RNA polymerase II
Sources:Amigo / QuickGO
Orthologs
Databases	NCBI: entry; OMA: entry
Species	Human	Mouse
Entrez	4801	18045
Ensembl	ENSG00000120837	ENSMUSG00000020248
UniProt	P25208	P63139
RefSeq (mRNA)	NM_006166	NM_010914
RefSeq (protein)	NP_006157; NP_006157.1	NP_035044
Location (UCSC)	Chr 12: 104.12 – 104.14 Mb	Chr 10: 82.58 – 82.6 Mb
PubMed search
- Wikidata
View/Edit Human	View/Edit Mouse

Nuclear transcription factor Y subunit beta is a protein that in humans is encoded by the NFYB gene.

== Function ==
The protein encoded by this gene is one subunit of a trimeric complex, forming a highly conserved transcription factor that binds with high specificity to CCAAT motifs in the promoter regions in a variety of genes. This gene product, subunit B, forms a tight dimer with the C subunit, a prerequisite for subunit A association. The resulting trimer binds to DNA with high specificity and affinity. Subunits B and C each contain a histone-like motif. Observation of the histone nature of these subunits is supported by two types of evidence; protein sequence alignments and experiments with mutants.

== Interactions ==
NFYB has been shown to interact with:

- CEBPZ,
- CNTN2,
- Myc, and
- TBP
