= 3T3-L1 =

Cell line used in biological research

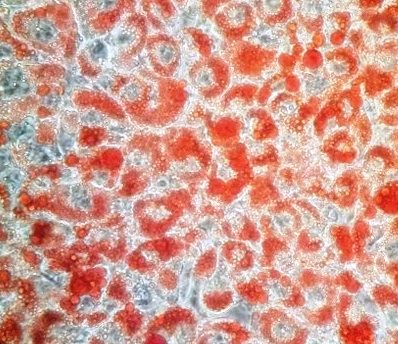
Differentiated adipocytes in a 3T3-L1 cell line stained with Oil Red O

3T3-L1 is a sub clonal cell line derived from the original 3T3 Swiss albino cell line of 1962. The 3T3 original cell line was isolated from a mouse embryo and propagated for this specific line of 3T3 cells is used to study adipose tissue-related diseases and dysfunctions. The 3T3-L1 Swiss subclone line has been widely utilized, since its development, due to its affinity for lipid droplet deposition in vitro. 3T3-L1 cells have a fibroblast-like morphology, but, under appropriate conditions, the cells differentiate into an adipocyte-like phenotype, providing an exemplar model for white adipocytes. 3T3-L1 cells can be utilized to study a number of cellular and molecular mechanisms related to insulin-resistance, obesity, and diabetes in vitro. Aside from its usages, this cell line is widely developed and can be purchased for continuous propagation for numerous research studies. 3T3-L1 cells of the adipocyte morphology increase the synthesis and accumulation of triglycerides and acquire the signet ring appearance of adipose cells. These cells are also sensitive to lipogenic and lipolytic hormones, as well as drugs, including epinephrine, isoproterenol, and insulin.

== Lineage development ==
The 3T3-L1 cell line is a sub clone that was initially developed from a mouse embryo, from a clonal expansion of Swiss 3T3 cells. In 1962, the original 3T3 cell line that it was established by George Todaro and Howard Green of the New York University School of Medicine. The original cell line was developed through the 3T3 process, which is where the cells derive their naming nomenclature. The 3T3 process began with cultures having 3 days to propagate on a plate (the first "3"), and then a transfer (the "T") of 300,000 cells (second "3") to a new plate to restart the process. These cells will be identified as 3T3 only after they are taken through 20 to 30 passages and have established at a stable growth rate. These cells were originally used to study the properties of transformed cells and the mechanisms of neoplastic transformation. In 1971, Green and Kehinde established a subline of 3T3 cells, called 3T3-L1, which demonstrated a greater propensity for differentiation into adipocytes and a higher affinity for lipid deposition. The cells were cultured in a serum-containing medium and demonstrated a fibroblast-like morphology. In the early 1980s, it was discovered that these cells could be induced to differentiate into adipocytes in response to hormonal stimulation.

== Cell culture characteristics ==
3T3-L1 cells, similar to their other 3T3 counterparts, are typically propagated as an adherent monolayer within a culture vessel. Basal cell culture medias for 3T3-L1 cells tends to contain a version of Dubelcco's Modified Eagle's Medium (DMEM), fetal bovine serum (FBS), and an antibiotic at specific levels dependent upon protocol. The DMEM provides essential nutrients, while the FBS provides vital growth factors, and the antibiotic protects against culture contamination. The process of adipogenesis, and the start of differentiation can be induced in 3T3-L1 cells through the addition of compounds such as a synthetic glucocorticoid, a phosphodiesterase inhibitor, and insulin. The most commonly used synthetic glucocorticoid in adipocyte differentiation procedures tends to be dexamethasone and the most commonly used phosphodiesterase inhibitor is 1-methyl-3-isobutyl-xanthine (IBMX). These compounds are usually used in varying combinations and concentrations in differentiation media dependent upon the protocol utilized. 3T3-L1 cells are commonly utilized as an effective model for white adipocytes because of their similar fibroblast-like morphology, lipid accumulation, gene expression, and basal energy exchanges and transformations. Although, some literature suggests that 3T3-L1 adipocytes can possess certain phenotypic signatures similar to other adipocyte lineages aside from white adipocytes.

== Adipogenesis and lipogenesis ==
Adipogenesis can be described as the effective differentiation of preadipocytes into mature adipocytes that can then undergo lipogenesis. During this period, cells can undergo hyperplastic growth until they are differentiated. Since 3T3-L1 cells are an immortalized cell line and require a hormonal differentiation, there has been much debate on their comparability to in vivo studies and primary cell lines. Aside from the synthetic differentiation itself, 3T3-L1 lineages can display low differentiation efficiency when utilizing common differentiation methods. Low differentiation efficiency can change adipogenesis and lipogenesis related experiment results and limit result interpretation. Studies suggest that differentiation efficiency can rely on factors such as culture dish material, culture dish provider, culture dish type, cell confluence at the time of differentiation. Lipogenesis can be described as the biochemical and physical accumulation of triacylglycerides in a differentiated adipocyte. Again, the deposition of adipose tissue relies on the number of adipocytes, their differentiation efficiency and overall lipid accumulation. It is not unrelated that the inhibition of one of these processes could impact others as well.

== Advantages and disadvantages ==
One advantage of using 3T3-L1 cells is their well-characterized differentiation process, which allows for reproducible experiments and comparison of results across studies. Additionally, the cells can be easily cultured and maintained in the laboratory, and are relatively inexpensive compared to other cell lines or animal models. However, one limitation of using 3T3-L1 cells is that they are derived from mice and may not fully recapitulate human biology. Additionally, 3T3-L1 cells are a homogeneous cell population, which may not fully reflect the heterogeneity of adipose tissue in vivo. These limitations can affect comparability of this particular cell lineage.

== Discoveries ==
While 3T3-L1 gene expression mimics that of a white adipocyte, some literature suggests some phenotypic 3T3-L1 characteristics can resemble that of brown adipocytes. 3T3-L1 cells, when supplemented with catecholamines, utilized UCP-1 to increase oxygen consumption similar to brown adipocytes. This brown adipocyte characteristic was only enhanced with long-term catecholamine supplementation. While the 3T3-L1 lineage can display characteristics similar to both white and brown adipocytes, they have had different results in relation to beige adipocyte phenotypecharacteristics. When 3T3-L1 cells are differentiated into beige adipocytes, they fail to express any beige phenotypic signatures. The process of differentiation is constantly being re-evaluated in the adipose research sector. While a majority of in vitro experiments utilize the common insulin, dexamethasone, and IBMX combinations, others have found other methods of differentiating and inducing the process of adipogenesis. Other methods can include transfection with a ras oncogene, the combination of dexamethasone and octanoate, and the normal combination with the addition of a peroxisome proliferator-activated receptor y (PPARy) agonist. While some protocols promote the process of adipogenesis in 3T3-L1 cells, others reduce or inhibit the process. In 3T3-L1 adipocytes, oleanolic acid (5umol/L) down regulated the expression of PPARy and cytidine-cytidine-adenosine-adenosine-thymidine (CCAAT) enhancer binding protein a (C/EBPa) during differentiation. Thus, oleanolic acid suppressed adipocyte differentiation and consequential lipid accumulation when applied in differentiation media to 3T3-L1 cells. Berberine impacted GATA-2 and GATA-3 and thus inhibited 3T3-L1 differentiation when applied during differentiation or post-differentiation in vitro. Long term treatment of flavonoid, luteolin, affected PPARy activation and suppressed adipogenesis 3T3-L1 adipocytes. Isopanduratin A also inhibited adipogenesis in 3T3-L1 adipocytes by impacting multiple targets in the adipogenic growth cycle such as PPARy, C/EBPa, sterol regulatory binding protein- 1c (SREB-1c), adiponectin, and lipoprotein lipase(LPL).
