= Contactin 2 =

Protein found in humans

CNTN2

Identifiers
- Aliases: CNTN2, AXT, FAME5, TAG-1, TAX, TAX1, contactin 2, transient axonal glycoprotein-1
- External IDs: OMIM: 190197; MGI: 104518; GeneCards: CNTN2
Available structures
PDB	Ortholog search: PDBe RCSB
PDB	List of PDB id codes 2OM5

Gene location (Human)
Chr.	Chromosome 1 (human)
Band	1q32.1	Start	205,042,937 bp
Band	1q32.1	End	205,078,289 bp

Gene location (Mouse)
Chr.	Chromosome 1 (mouse)
Band	1|1 E4	Start	132,437,165 bp
Band	1|1 E4	End	132,470,994 bp
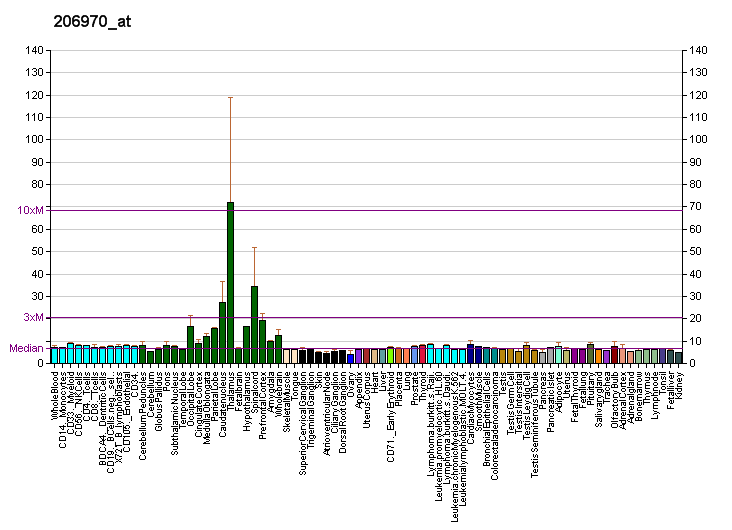
RNA expression pattern
Bgee	Human / Mouse (ortholog); Top expressed in: inferior ganglion of vagus nerve; C1 segment; corpus callosum; internal globus pallidus; subthalamic nucleus; pars reticulata; ventral tegmental area; superior vestibular nucleus; external globus pallidus; pons / Top expressed in: cerebellar cortex; superior frontal gyrus; primary visual cortex; trigeminal ganglion; cerebellar vermis; ganglionic eminence; lobe of cerebellum; central gray substance of midbrain; deep cerebellar nuclei; pontine nuclei; More reference expression data
BioGPS	More reference expression data
Gene ontology
Molecular function	protein self-association; identical protein binding; carbohydrate binding; cell-cell adhesion mediator activity
Cellular component	membrane; myelin sheath; voltage-gated potassium channel complex; plasma membrane; node of Ranvier; synapse; integral component of plasma membrane; cell surface; axon; soma; anchored component of membrane; neuron projection; juxtaparanode region of axon; anchored component of postsynaptic membrane
Biological process	clustering of voltage-gated potassium channels; negative regulation of neuron differentiation; central nervous system myelination; receptor internalization; neuron migration; learning; presynaptic membrane organization; regulation of astrocyte differentiation; regulation of axon diameter; cell adhesion; positive regulation of protein processing; establishment of protein localization to juxtaparanode region of axon; positive regulation of adenosine receptor signaling pathway; cerebral cortex GABAergic interneuron migration; regulation of neuronal synaptic plasticity; protein localization to juxtaparanode region of axon; regulation of cell morphogenesis involved in differentiation; neuron projection development; axonal fasciculation; microtubule cytoskeleton organization; adult walking behavior; axon guidance; nervous system development; homophilic cell adhesion via plasma membrane adhesion molecules; dendrite self-avoidance
Sources:Amigo / QuickGO
Orthologs
Databases	NCBI: entry; OMA: entry
Species	Human	Mouse
Entrez	6900	21367
Ensembl	ENSG00000184144	ENSMUSG00000053024
UniProt	Q02246	Q61330
RefSeq (mRNA)	NM_005076; NM_001346083	NM_011531; NM_177129
RefSeq (protein)	NP_001333012; NP_005067	NP_796103
Location (UCSC)	Chr 1: 205.04 – 205.08 Mb	Chr 1: 132.44 – 132.47 Mb
PubMed search
- Wikidata
View/Edit Human	View/Edit Mouse

Contactin-2 is a protein that in humans is encoded by the CNTN2 gene.

== Function ==
The protein encoded by this gene is a member of the immunoglobulin superfamily. It is a glycosylphosphatidylinositol (GPI)-anchored neuronal membrane protein that functions as a cell adhesion molecule. It may play a role in the formation of axon connections in the developing nervous system. It may also be involved in glial tumorigenesis and may provide a potential target for therapeutic intervention.

== Interactions ==
CNTN2 has been shown to interact with CNTNAP2 and NFYB.
