= CCAAT/enhancer binding protein zeta =

Protein found in humans

CEBPZ

Identifiers
- Aliases: CEBPZ, CBF, CBF2, HSP-CBF, NOC1, CCAAT/enhancer binding protein zeta, CCAAT enhancer binding protein zeta
- External IDs: OMIM: 612828; MGI: 109386; GeneCards: CEBPZ

Gene location (Human)
Chr.	Chromosome 2 (human)
Band	2p22.2	Start	37,201,612 bp
Band	2p22.2	End	37,231,596 bp

Gene location (Mouse)
Chr.	Chromosome 17 (mouse)
Band	17|17 E3	Start	79,226,435 bp
Band	17|17 E3	End	79,244,495 bp
RNA expression pattern
Bgee	Human / Mouse (ortholog); Top expressed in: Achilles tendon; tendon of biceps brachii; ventricular zone; internal globus pallidus; left testis; gastrocnemius muscle; right testis; testicle; epithelium of colon; pericardium / Top expressed in: otic placode; basilar part of occipital bone; saccule; otic vesicle; tail of embryo; genital tubercle; maxillary prominence; lacrimal gland; mandibular prominence; Ileal epithelium; More reference expression data
BioGPS	n/a
Gene ontology
Molecular function	RNA polymerase II cis-regulatory region sequence-specific DNA binding; DNA binding; DNA-binding transcription activator activity, RNA polymerase II-specific; RNA binding; DNA-binding transcription factor activity, RNA polymerase II-specific
Cellular component	nucleus
Biological process	regulation of transcription, DNA-templated; transcription by RNA polymerase II; transcription, DNA-templated; positive regulation of transcription by RNA polymerase II; ribosome biogenesis
Sources:Amigo / QuickGO
Orthologs
Databases	NCBI: entry; OMA: entry
Species	Human	Mouse
Entrez	10153	12607
Ensembl	ENSG00000115816	ENSMUSG00000024081
UniProt	Q03701	P53569
RefSeq (mRNA)	NM_005760	NM_001024806; NM_009882
RefSeq (protein)	NP_005751	NP_001019977
Location (UCSC)	Chr 2: 37.2 – 37.23 Mb	Chr 17: 79.23 – 79.24 Mb
PubMed search
- Wikidata
View/Edit Human	View/Edit Mouse

CCAAT/enhancer-binding protein zeta is a protein that in humans is encoded by the CEBPZ gene.

== Interactions ==
CCAAT/enhancer binding protein zeta has been shown to interact with:

- NFYB,
- P53,
- P73

== See also ==
- Ccaat-enhancer-binding proteins
