= CCAAT-enhancer-binding proteins =

Protein family

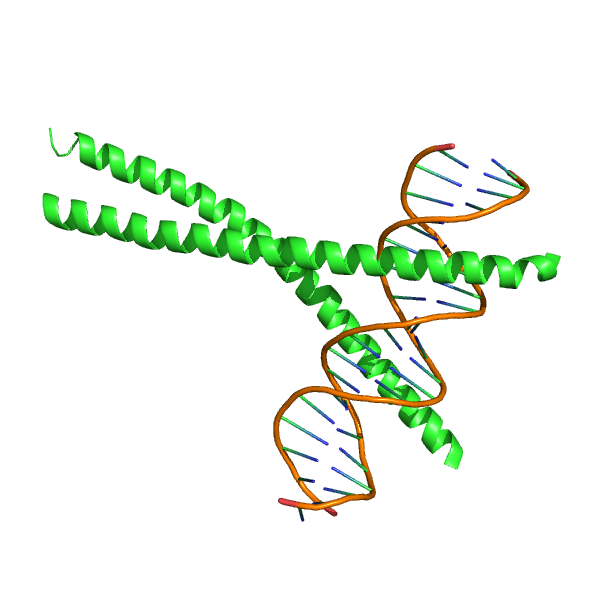
C/EBPα bZip domain bound to DNA. PDB entry 1nwq

CCAAT-enhancer-binding proteins (or C/EBPs) is a family of transcription factors composed of six members, named from C/EBPα to C/EBPζ. They promote the expression of certain genes through interaction with their promoters. Once bound to DNA, C/EBPs can recruit so-called co-activators (such as CBP) that in turn can open up chromatin structure or recruit basal transcription factors.

== Function ==
C/EBP proteins interact with the CCAAT (cytosine-cytosine-adenosine-adenosine-thymidine) box motif, which is present in several gene promoters. They are characterized by a highly conserved basic-leucine zipper (bZIP) domain at the C-terminus. This domain is involved in dimerization and DNA binding, as are other transcription factors of the leucine zipper domain-containing family (c-Fos and c-jun). The bZIP domain structure of C/EBPs is composed of an α-helix that forms a "coiled coil" structure when it dimerizes. Members of the C/EBP family can form homodimers or heterodimers with other C/EBPs and with other transcription factors, which may or may not contain the leucine zipper domain. The dimerization is necessary to enable C/EBPs to bind specifically to DNA through a palindromic sequence in the major groove of the DNA. C/EBP proteins also contain activation domains at the N-terminus and regulatory domains.

These proteins are found in hepatocytes, adipocytes, hematopoietic cells, spleen, kidney, brain, and many other organs. C/EBP proteins are involved in different cellular responses, such as in the control of cellular proliferation, growth and differentiation, in metabolism, and in immunity. Nearly all the members of the C/EBP family can induce transcription through their activation domains by interacting with components of the basal transcription apparatus. (C/EBPγ is an exception that lacks a functional transcriptional activation domain.) Their expression is regulated at multiple levels, including through hormones, mitogens, cytokines, nutrients, and other factors.

This protein is expressed in the mammalian nervous system and plays a significant role in the development and function of nerve cells. C/EBPβ plays a role in neuronal differentiation, in learning, in memory processes, in glial and neuronal cell functions, and in neurotrophic factor expression.

== Gene transcription ==
The C/EBPα, C/EBPβ, C/EBPγ and C/EBPδ genes are without introns. C/EBPζ has four exons; C/EBPε has two, which lead to four isoforms due to an alternative use of promoters and splicing. For C/EBPα and C/EBPβ, different sizes of polypeptides can be produced by alternative use of initiation codons. This is thought to be due to weak ribosome scanning mechanisms. The mRNA of C/EBPα can transcribe into two polypeptides. For C/EBPβ, three different polypeptides are made: LAP* (38 kDa), LAP (35 kDa) and LIP (20 kDa). The most translated isoform is LAP, then LAP* and LIP. LIP can act as an inhibitor of the other C/EBPs by forming non-functional heterodimers.

== Regulation ==
C/EBPβ function is regulated by multiple mechanisms, including phosphorylation, acetylation, activation, autoregulation, and repression via other transcription factors, oncogenic elements, or chemokines. C/EBPβ can interact with CREB, NF-κB, and other proteins, leading to a trans-activation potential.

Phosphorylation of C/EBPβ can have an activation or a repression effect. For example, phosphorylation of threonine 235 in human C/EBPβ, or of threonine 188 in mouse and rat C/EBPβ, is important for C/EBPβ trans-activation capacity. Phosphorylation(s) of C/EBPβ in its regulatory domain can also modulate its function.

It was shown in C. elegans that multiple cis elements of cebp-1 mRNA 3'UTR interact with mak-2 to upregulate expression of CEBP-1 in neuronal development.

== Clinical significance ==
=== Role in adipogenesis ===
C/EBPβ and δ are transiently induced during the early stages of adipocyte differentiation (adipogenesis), while C/EBPα is upregulated during the terminal stages of adipogenesis. In vitro and in vivo studies have demonstrated that each plays an important role in this process. For example, Murine Embryonic Fibroblasts (MEFs) from mice lacking both C/EBPβ and C/EBPδ show impaired adipocyte differentiation in response to adipogenic stimuli. In contrast, ectopic expression of C/EBPβ and δ in 3T3-L1 preadipocytes promotes adipogenesis, even in the absence of adipogenic stimuli. C/EBPβ and δ promote adipogenesis, at least in part by inducing the expression of the "master" adipogenic transcription factors C/EBPα and PPARγ.

C/EBPα is required both for adipogenesis and for normal adipocyte function. For example, mice lacking C/EBPα in all tissues except the liver (where it is needed to avoid postnatal lethality) show abnormal adipose tissue formation. Moreover, ectopic expression of C/EBPα in various fibroblast cell lines promotes adipogenesis. C/EBPα probably promotes adipogenesis by inducing the expression of PPARγ.

=== Role in osteoporosis ===
C/EBPβ has been found to have a role in the development of osteoporosis. The full-length isoform of the C/EBPβ protein (LAP) activates the MafB gene, whereas the short isoform (LIP) suppresses it. MafB gene activation suppresses the formation of osteoclasts. Thus, upregulation of LAP diminishes the number of osteoclasts, and this weakens the osteoporotic process, whereas upregulation of LIP does the opposite, increasing loss of bone mass.

The LAP/LIP balance is determined by the mTOR protein. Inhibition of the expression of mTOR can stop osteoclast activity.

=== Role in cancer ===
CCAAT/enhancer-binding proteins are often involved in growth arrest and differentiation, which has been interpreted to suggest that these proteins harbor tumor suppressive activities. However, CCAAT/enhancer-binding protein over-expression correlates with poor prognosis in glioblastoma and promotes genomic instability in cervical cancer, hinting at an oncogenic role. Importantly, however, C/EBPδ acts as a tumor suppressor in pancreatic ductal adenocarcinoma. This is of particular interest since only few tumor suppressors have been identified in the context of pancreatic cancer. The function of CCAAT/enhancer-binding proteins in cancer is thus clearly context dependent but largely tumor suppressive.

=== Role in neurodegeneration ===
C/EBPβ levels are increased in cortical samples of Alzheimer's and Parkinson's disease victims at autopsy. Cell culture studies in mice and human microglia lines also find increased C/EBPβ activity associated with pathogenic inflammation and cytokine responses. Downstream analysis of genes regulated by C/EBPβ have significance in immune response, mitochondrial health, and autophagy. Molecular interference of these cellular processes have been shown to play a role in neurodegenerative pathogenesis. Genetic and molecular pathways with degenerative implications involving C/EBPβ and its homologs are conserved across multiple model organisms including Mus musculus, Drosophila melanogaster, Caenorhabditis elegans, and Danio rerio. Upstream regulators of C/EBPβ include genes known to be associated with neurodegenerative and neurodevelopmental disease when mutated or dysregulated. This includes a well characterized cellular stress response pathway involving p38 and JNK.
