= CEBPE =

Protein-coding gene in humans

Identifiers
- Aliases: CEBPE, C/EBP-epsilon, CRP1, CCAAT/enhancer binding protein epsilon, CCAAT enhancer binding protein epsilon, c/EBP epsilon
- External IDs: OMIM: 600749; MGI: 103572; GeneCards: CEBPE
Available structures
PDB	Ortholog search: PDBe RCSB
PDB	List of PDB id codes 3T92

Gene location (Human)
Chr.	Chromosome 14 (human)
Band	14q11.2	Start	23,117,036 bp
Band	14q11.2	End	23,120,256 bp

Gene location (Mouse)
Chr.	Chromosome 14 (mouse)
Band	14 C2|14 27.9 cM	Start	54,947,817 bp
Band	14 C2|14 27.9 cM	End	54,949,631 bp
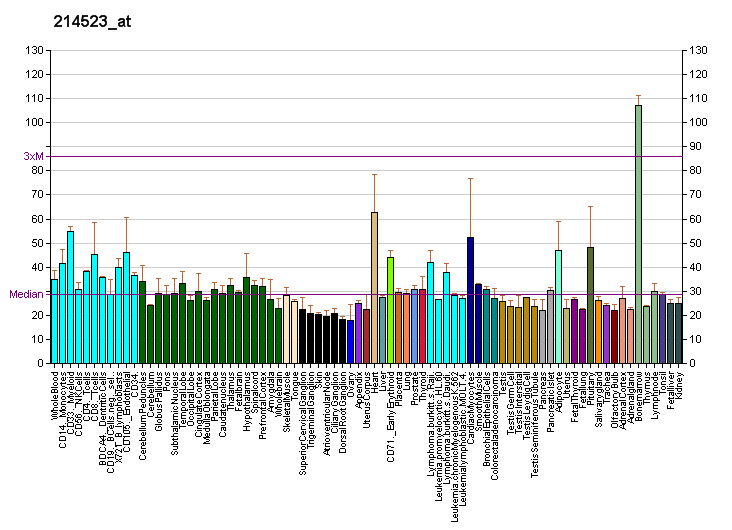
RNA expression pattern
Bgee	Human / Mouse (ortholog); Top expressed in: bone marrow; trabecular bone; bone marrow cell; gonad; blood; monocyte; granulocyte; vena cava; spleen; duodenum / Top expressed in: granulocyte; bone marrow; embryo; liver; jejunum; ileum; spleen; lip; quadriceps femoris muscle; colon; More reference expression data
BioGPS	More reference expression data
Gene ontology
Molecular function	protein heterodimerization activity; DNA-binding transcription factor activity; RNA polymerase II cis-regulatory region sequence-specific DNA binding; DNA binding; DNA-binding transcription activator activity, RNA polymerase II-specific; protein homodimerization activity; protein binding; DNA-binding transcription factor activity, RNA polymerase II-specific
Cellular component	nucleoplasm; nucleus
Biological process	defense response; myeloid cell differentiation; positive regulation of gene expression; cellular response to lipopolysaccharide; regulation of transcription, DNA-templated; defense response to bacterium; transcription, DNA-templated; positive regulation of transcription by RNA polymerase II; macrophage differentiation; phagocytosis; transcription by RNA polymerase II; granulocyte differentiation
Sources:Amigo / QuickGO
Orthologs
Databases	NCBI: entry; OMA: entry
Species	Human	Mouse
Entrez	1053	110794
Ensembl	ENSG00000092067	ENSMUSG00000052435
UniProt	Q15744	Q6PZD9
RefSeq (mRNA)	NM_001805	NM_207131
RefSeq (protein)	NP_001796	NP_997014
Location (UCSC)	Chr 14: 23.12 – 23.12 Mb	Chr 14: 54.95 – 54.95 Mb
PubMed search
- Wikidata
View/Edit Human	View/Edit Mouse

CCAAT/enhancer binding protein (C/EBP), epsilon, also known as CEBPE and CRP1, is a type of CCAAT-enhancer-binding protein. CEBPE is its human gene and is pro-apoptotic.

The protein encoded by this gene is a bZIP transcription factor which can bind as a homodimer to certain DNA regulatory regions. It can also form heterodimers with the related protein CEBP-δ. The encoded protein may be essential for terminal differentiation and functional maturation of committed granulocyte progenitor cells. Mutations in this gene have been associated with specific granule deficiency, a rare congenital disorder. Multiple variants of this gene have been described, but the full-length nature of only one has been determined.
