= IBMX =

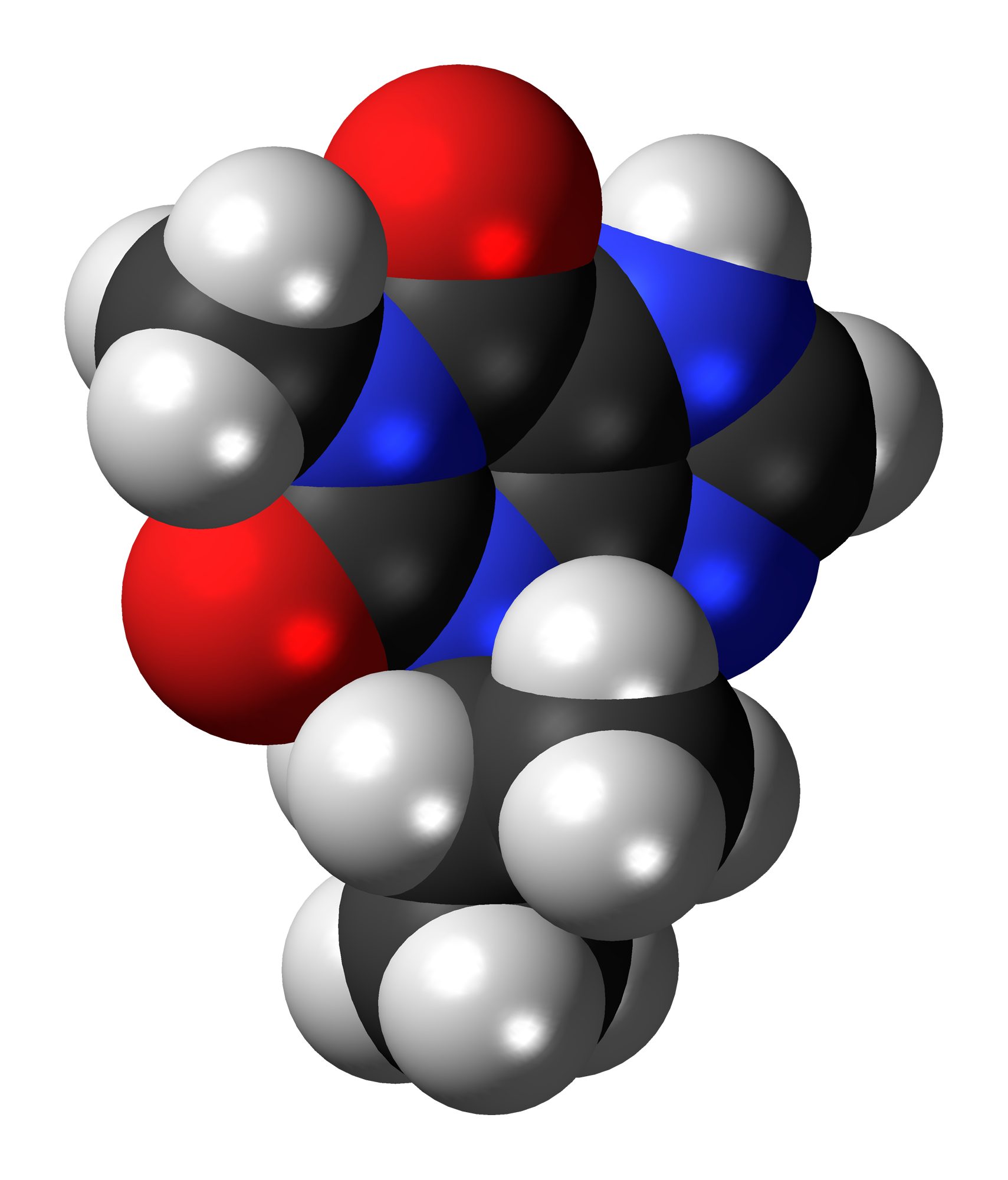

Names
- IUPAC name 1-Methyl-3-(2-methylpropyl)-7H-purine-2,6-dione
- Other names 3-Isobutyl-1-methylxanthine; Isobutylmethylxanthine; Methylisobutylxanthine

Identifiers
CAS Number	28822-58-4
3D model (JSmol)	Interactive image
ChEBI	CHEBI:34795
ChEMBL	ChEMBL275084
ChemSpider	3627
DrugBank	DB07954
ECHA InfoCard	100.044.767
IUPHAR/BPS	388
KEGG	C13708
PubChem CID	3758
UNII	TBT296U68M
CompTox Dashboard (EPA)	DTXSID0040549
- InChI: InChI=1S/C10H14N4O2/c1-6(2)4-14-8-7(11-5-12-8)9(15)13(3)10(14)16/h5-6H,4H2,1-3H3,(H,11,12) Key: APIXJSLKIYYUKG-UHFFFAOYSA-N; InChI=1/C10H14N4O2/c1-6(2)4-14-8-7(11-5-12-8)9(15)13(3)10(14)16/h5-6H,4H2,1-3H3,(H,11,12) Key: APIXJSLKIYYUKG-UHFFFAOYAL
- SMILES: CC(C)Cn1c2c(c(=O)n(c1=O)C)[nH]cn2

Properties
Chemical formula	C_{10}H_{14}N_{4}O_{2}
Molar mass	222.3 g/mol
Appearance	White solid
Melting point	199 to 201 °C (390 to 394 °F; 472 to 474 K)
Solubility	Soluble in ethanol, DMSO, and methanol
- Except where otherwise noted, data are given for materials in their standard state (at 25 °C [77 °F], 100 kPa). verify (what is ?) Infobox references

IBMX (3-isobutyl-1-methylxanthine), like other methylxanthine derivatives, is both a:

1. competitive non-selective phosphodiesterase inhibitor which raises intracellular cAMP, activates PKA, inhibits TNFα and leukotriene synthesis, and reduces inflammation and innate immunity, and
2. nonselective adenosine receptor antagonist.

As a phosphodiesterase inhibitor, IBMX has IC_{50} = 2–50 μM and does not inhibit PDE8 or PDE9.
