= CEBPD =

Protein-coding gene in the species Homo sapiens

Identifiers
- Aliases: CEBPD, C/EBP-delta, CELF, CRP3, NF-IL6-beta, CCAAT/enhancer binding protein delta, CCAAT enhancer binding protein delta
- External IDs: OMIM: 116898; MGI: 103573; GeneCards: CEBPD

Gene location (Human)
Chr.	Chromosome 8 (human)
Band	8q11.21	Start	47,736,913 bp
Band	8q11.21	End	47,738,164 bp

Gene location (Mouse)
Chr.	Chromosome 16 (mouse)
Band	16 A2|16 10.09 cM	Start	15,705,150 bp
Band	16 A2|16 10.09 cM	End	15,708,895 bp
RNA expression pattern
Bgee	Human / Mouse (ortholog); Top expressed in: pericardium; vena cava; lower lobe of lung; trachea; cardia; beta cell; mucosa of paranasal sinus; olfactory bulb; cartilage tissue; gastric mucosa / Top expressed in: left lung lobe; granulocyte; umbilical cord; endothelial cell of lymphatic vessel; gastrula; right lung; muscle of thigh; carotid body; ankle; ankle joint; More reference expression data
BioGPS	n/a
Gene ontology
Molecular function	DNA-binding transcription factor activity; RNA polymerase II cis-regulatory region sequence-specific DNA binding; DNA binding; sequence-specific DNA binding; DNA-binding transcription activator activity, RNA polymerase II-specific; protein binding; DNA-binding transcription factor activity, RNA polymerase II-specific; protein homodimerization activity; protein heterodimerization activity
Cellular component	nucleus; nucleoplasm
Biological process	regulation of transcription, DNA-templated; transcription, DNA-templated; positive regulation of transcription by RNA polymerase II; transcription by RNA polymerase II; cytokine-mediated signaling pathway; hematopoietic progenitor cell differentiation; regulation of transcription by RNA polymerase II; fat cell differentiation; positive regulation of osteoblast differentiation; negative regulation of transcription, DNA-templated; inner ear development
Sources:Amigo / QuickGO
Orthologs
Databases	NCBI: entry; OMA: entry
Species	Human	Mouse
Entrez	1052	12609
Ensembl	ENSG00000221869	ENSMUSG00000071637
UniProt	P49716	Q00322
RefSeq (mRNA)	NM_005195	NM_007679
RefSeq (protein)	NP_005186	NP_031705
Location (UCSC)	Chr 8: 47.74 – 47.74 Mb	Chr 16: 15.71 – 15.71 Mb
PubMed search
- Wikidata
View/Edit Human	View/Edit Mouse

CCAAT/enhancer-binding protein delta is a protein that in humans is encoded by the CEBPD gene.

== Function ==
The protein encoded by this intronless gene is a bZIP transcription factor which can bind as a homodimer to certain DNA regulatory regions. It can also form heterodimers with the related protein CEBP-alpha. The encoded protein is important in the regulation of genes involved in immune and inflammatory responses, and may be involved in the regulation of genes associated with activation and/or differentiation of macrophages.

== Functions ==
CEBPD is involved in regulation of apoptosis and cell proliferation. It probably acts as tumor suppressor.

One study in mice showed that CEBPD prevents development of tubular injury and tubulointerstitial fibrogenesis during the progression of chronic obstructive nephropathy.

Function of CEBPD gene can be effectively examined by siRNA knockdown based on an independent validation.

== Interactions ==
CEBPD has been shown to interact with Mothers against decapentaplegic homolog 3.

== See also ==
- Ccaat-enhancer-binding proteins
