= CEBPA =

Protein-coding gene in humans

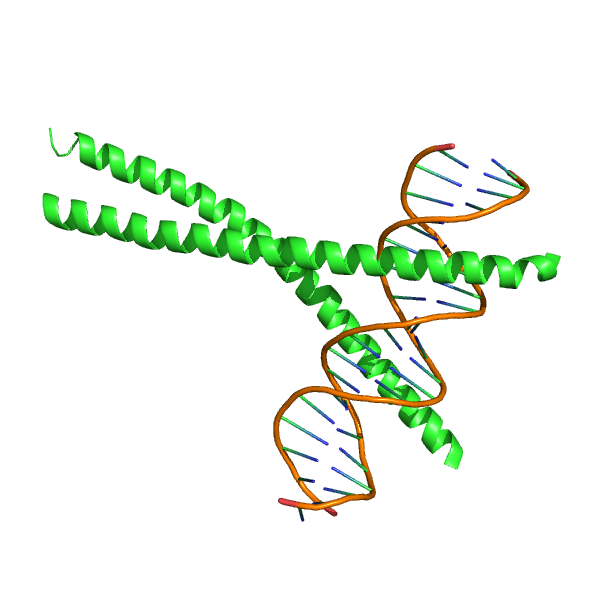

Identifiers
- Aliases: CEBPA, C/EBP-alpha, CEBP, CCAAT/enhancer binding protein alpha, CCAAT enhancer binding protein alpha
- External IDs: OMIM: 116897; MGI: 99480; GeneCards: CEBPA

Gene location (Human)
Chr.	Chromosome 19 (human)
Band	19q13.11	Start	33,299,934 bp
Band	19q13.11	End	33,302,534 bp

Gene location (Mouse)
Chr.	Chromosome 7 (mouse)
Band	7 B2|7 21.02 cM	Start	34,818,718 bp
Band	7 B2|7 21.02 cM	End	34,821,353 bp
RNA expression pattern
Bgee	Human / Mouse (ortholog); Top expressed in: nipple; skin of arm; human penis; skin of thigh; skin of abdomen; right lobe of liver; monocyte; adipose tissue; subcutaneous adipose tissue; vulva / Top expressed in: lactiferous gland; brown adipose tissue; subcutaneous adipose tissue; white adipose tissue; lip; tunica adventitia of aorta; skin of external ear; stroma of bone marrow; right lung; gallbladder; More reference expression data
BioGPS	n/a
Gene ontology
Molecular function	DNA binding; sequence-specific DNA binding; protein homodimerization activity; DNA-binding transcription activator activity, RNA polymerase II-specific; DNA-binding transcription factor activity; transcription coactivator activity; transcription factor binding; RNA polymerase II cis-regulatory region sequence-specific DNA binding; kinase binding; protein binding; transcription factor activity, RNA polymerase II distal enhancer sequence-specific binding; DNA-binding transcription factor activity, RNA polymerase II-specific
Cellular component	transcription regulator complex; RNA polymerase II transcription regulator complex; nucleolus; nucleus; nucleoplasm; intracellular membrane-bounded organelle
Biological process	Notch signaling pathway; transcription by RNA polymerase I; myeloid cell differentiation; regulation of transcription, DNA-templated; cellular response to lithium ion; glucose homeostasis; negative regulation of cyclin-dependent protein serine/threonine kinase activity; lung development; cytokine-mediated signaling pathway; urea cycle; regulation of transcription by RNA polymerase II; cellular response to organic cyclic compound; mitochondrion organization; embryonic placenta development; cholesterol metabolic process; negative regulation of cell cycle; negative regulation of transcription by RNA polymerase II; cell maturation; generation of precursor metabolites and energy; transcription, DNA-templated; macrophage differentiation; multicellular organism development; positive regulation of transcription, DNA-templated; positive regulation of osteoblast differentiation; granulocyte differentiation; regulation of cell population proliferation; brown fat cell differentiation; lipid homeostasis; white fat cell differentiation; inner ear development; liver development; viral process; negative regulation of transcription, DNA-templated; positive regulation of fat cell differentiation; positive regulation of transcription by RNA polymerase III; fat cell differentiation; positive regulation of proteasomal ubiquitin-dependent protein catabolic process; positive regulation of transcription by RNA polymerase II; negative regulation of cell population proliferation; transcription by RNA polymerase II; cellular response to tumor necrosis factor; positive regulation of DNA-templated transcription, initiation; positive regulation of macrophage activation; positive regulation of inflammatory response; interleukin-6-mediated signaling pathway
Sources:Amigo / QuickGO
Orthologs
Databases	NCBI: entry; OMA: entry
Species	Human	Mouse
Entrez	1050	12606
Ensembl	ENSG00000245848	ENSMUSG00000034957
UniProt	P49715	P53566
RefSeq (mRNA)	NM_004364; NM_001285829; NM_001287424; NM_001287435	NM_001287514; NM_001287515; NM_001287521; NM_001287523; NM_007678
RefSeq (protein)	NP_001272758; NP_001274353; NP_001274364; NP_004355	NP_001274443; NP_001274444; NP_001274450; NP_001274452; NP_031704
Location (UCSC)	Chr 19: 33.3 – 33.3 Mb	Chr 7: 34.82 – 34.82 Mb
PubMed search
- Wikidata
View/Edit Human	View/Edit Mouse

CCAAT/enhancer-binding protein alpha is a protein encoded by the CEBPA gene in humans. CCAAT/enhancer-binding protein alpha is a transcription factor involved in the differentiation of certain blood cells. For details on the CCAAT structural motif in gene enhancers and on CCAAT/Enhancer Binding Proteins see the specific page.

== Function ==
The protein encoded by this intronless gene is a bZIP transcription factor which can bind as a homodimer to certain promoters and gene enhancers. It can also form heterodimers with the related proteins CEBP-beta and CEBP-gamma, as well as distinct transcription factors such as c-Jun. The encoded protein is a key regulator of adipogenesis (the process of forming new fat cells) and the accumulation of lipids in those cells, as well as in the metabolism of glucose and lipids in the liver. The protein has been shown to bind to the promoter and modulate the expression of the gene encoding leptin, a protein that plays an important role in body weight homeostasis. Also, the encoded protein can interact with CDK2 and CDK4, thereby inhibiting these kinases and causing cultured cells to stop dividing. In addition, CEBPA is essential for myeloid lineage commitment and therefore required both for normal mature granulocyte formation and for the development of abnormal acute myeloid leukemia.

== Common mutations ==
There are two major categories which CEBPA mutations can be categorized into. One category of mutations prevent CCAAT/enhancer-binding protein alpha DNA binding by altering its COOH-terminal basic leucine zipper domain. The other category of mutations disrupt the translation of the CCAAT/enhancer-binding protein alpha NH_{2} terminus. CEBPA mutations, which result in diminished CCAAT/enhancer-binding protein alpha activity, contribute to the transformation of myeloid antecedents.

== Interactions ==
CEBPA has been shown to interact with cyclin-dependent kinase 2 and cyclin-dependent kinase 4.

== Clinical significance ==
It has been shown that mutation of CEBPA has been linked to good outcome in both adult and pediatric acute myeloid leukemia patients.

=== Significance in acute myeloid leukemia ===
Acute myeloid leukemia is characterized by genetic abnormalities in hematopoietic progenitors. This includes excessive proliferation of blasts, and blocking the hematopoiesis of granulocytes. It has been shown that suppression of CEBPA expression and blocking of CCAAT/enhancer-binding protein alpha stops the differentiation of myeloid progenitors. For this reason, CCAAT/enhancer-binding protein alpha's role during granulocyte differentiation and CEBPA's role as a tumor suppressor gene is critically important in the prognosis of acute myeloid leukemia.

=== Prognostic significance of CEBPA mutations ===
CCAAT/enhancer-binding protein alpha, the transcription factor that is encoded by CEBPA, is very important in the differentiation of immature granulocytes. Mutation of the CEBPA gene has been shown to play a crucial role in leukemogenesis and prognosis in acute myeloid leukemia patients. In recent studies CEBPA mutations were found in 7–15% of patients with acute myeloid leukemia. The three different types of mutations seen in these AML patients include germ-line N-terminal mutation, N-terminal frameshift mutation, and C-terminal mutation. These mutations are most frequently found in acute myeloid leukemia M1 or acute myeloid leukemia M2. Many reports link CEBPA mutations with a favorable outcome in acute myeloid leukemia. This is because these mutations are likely to induce differentiation arrest in these patients. Patients with CEBPA mutations have longer remission duration and survival time than those without the mutations. Therefore, the presence of CEBPA mutations are directly associated with a more favorable course for the progression of the disease.

=== Significance in solid tumors ===
Recently it has been shown that epigenetic modification of the distal promoter region of CEBPA has resulted in downregulation of CEBPA expression in pancreatic cancer cells, lung cancer, and head and neck squamous cell carcinoma.

=== Methylation of CEBPA as a prognostic biomarker in AML patients ===
A recent study has found that higher levels of CEBPA methylation are directly proportionate with treatment response. The complete response rate increased proportionately with the level of CEBPA methylation. For this reason it has been proposed that methylation of CEBPA could be a very useful biomarker in acute myeloid leukemia prognosis.

== See also ==
- Ccaat-enhancer-binding proteins
