= PWD =

PWD may refer to:

== Aviation ==
- Sher-Wood Airport, in Montana, United States
- PAWA Dominicana, flag carrier of the Dominican Republic from 2015 to 2018

== Government and military ==
- Petroleum Warfare Department, of the British Government during World War II (WWII)
- Philadelphia Water Department, a public utility in the northeastern United States
- Psychological Warfare Division, an Anglo-American WWII military unit

== Science and technology ==
- pwd, in computing, a Unix command
- Phosphoglucan, water dikinase, a phosphorus transferase enzyme
- Wilson disease protein, a P-type ATPase enzyme

== Sport ==
- Plymouth and West Devon Football League, England (founded 2004)
- Public Works Department cricket team, Pakistan (1964–2003)
- PWD Bamenda, a Cameroonian football club

== Other uses ==
- Parkway Drive, an Australian metalcore band (formed 2003)
- People with disabilities, those chronically impaired physically or intellectually
- Portuguese Water Dog, a dog breed
