= OK1 =

OK1 may refer to:

- Phosphoglucan, water dikinase, an enzyme
- PKP class Ok1
