= Petroleum Warfare Department =

British WW2 war department

The Petroleum Warfare Department (PWD) was a government department established in Britain in 1940 in response to the invasion crisis during World War II, when Germany apparently would invade the country. The department was initially tasked with developing the uses of petroleum as a weapon of war, and it oversaw the introduction of a wide range of flame warfare weapons. Later in the war, the department was instrumental in the creation of the Fog Investigation and Dispersal Operation (commonly known as FIDO) that cleared runways of fog allowing the landing of aircraft returning from bombing raids over Germany in poor visibility, and Operation Pluto, which installed prefabricated fuel pipelines between England and France soon after the Allied invasion of Normandy in June 1944.

== Inception ==
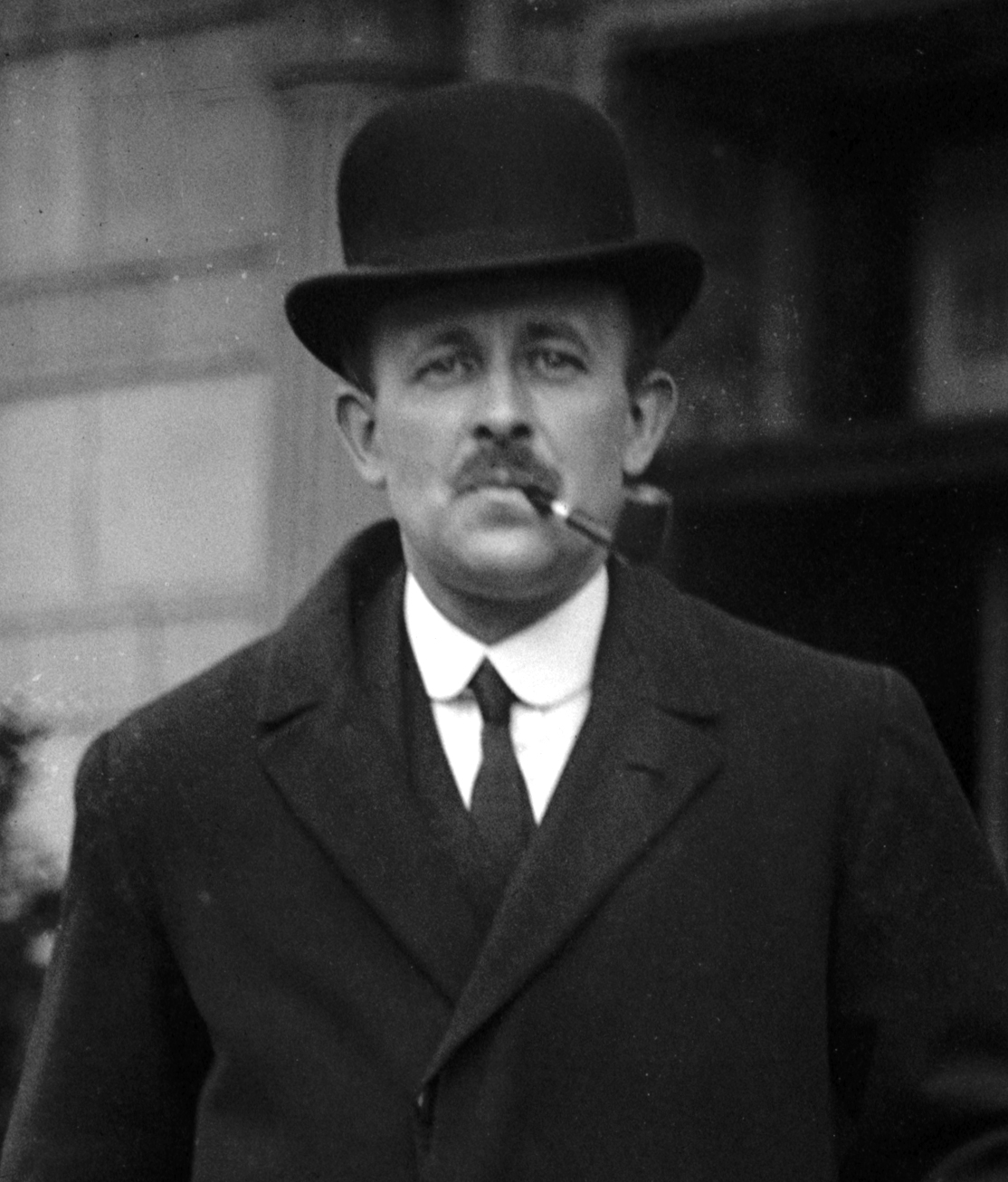
Maurice Hankey, 1921

At the beginning of World War II, in September 1939, little fighting occurred in the West until the German invasion of France and the Low Countries in May 1940. Following the fall of France and the withdrawal of the British Expeditionary Force (BEF) from the beaches at Dunkirk in June 1940, Britain was threatened with invasion by German armed forces in 1940 and 1941.

In response to this threat of invasion, the British sought to expand the Royal Navy, Royal Air Force, and Army, replace the equipment that had been left behind at Dunkirk, and supplement the regular armed services with volunteer organisations such as the part-time soldiers in the Home Guard. With many types of equipment in short supply, frantic efforts were made to develop new weapons – particularly those that did not require scarce materials.

Although oil imports from the Middle East had stopped and most oil for Britain came from the United States, no shortage of oil existed at the time; supplies originally intended for Europe were filling British storage facilities and full tankers were kept waiting in American ports. The amount of petrol allocated for civilian use was strictly rationed and pleasure motoring was strongly discouraged. This was not, at least initially, because of a shortage of petrol, but because it might lead to large congregations of well-fuelled vehicles at popular places.

In the event of an invasion, the British would be faced with the problem of destroying these stocks lest they should prove of use to the enemy (as they had in France). By mid-June, as a basic anti-invasion precaution, wayside petrol stations near the coast had been emptied, or at least had their pumps disabled, and garages everywhere were required to have a plan to prevent their stocks being of use to the invader.

On 29 May 1940, as the evacuation of the BEF was in progress, Maurice Hankey, then a cabinet minister without portfolio, joined the Ministerial Committee on Civil Defence (CDC) chaired by Sir John Anderson, the Secretary of State for the Home Office and Home Security. Among many ideas, Hankey "brought out of his stable a hobby horse, which he had ridden very hard in the 1914–18 war – namely the use of burning oil for defensive purposes." Hankey believed that oil should not just be denied to an invader, but used to impede him. Towards the end of June, Hankey brought his scheme up at a meeting of the Oil Control Board and produced for Commander-in-Chief Home Forces Edmund Ironside extracts of his paper on experiments with oil in the First World War. On 5 June, Churchill authorised Geoffrey Lloyd, the Secretary for Petroleum, to press ahead with experiments, with Hankey taking the matter under his general supervision.

== Donald Banks ==
Donald Banks had served with distinction in World War I, winning the Distinguished Service Order and Military Cross. He joined the civil service, and in 1934, he was made Director-General of the Post Office, he then moved to the Air Ministry and served there as Permanent Under Secretary from 1936 to 1938. Due to overwork, Banks was given lighter duties, including a mission to Australia to advise on aircraft production and a job at the Import Duties Advisory Committee. During this period, Banks was in the Territorial Army Reserve. When hostilities broke out in September 1939, the advisory committee was abolished and he was free to serve in the armed forces.

Banks was soon posted as air attaché to the quartermaster general of 50th (Northumbrian) Infantry Division – a first-line division of the Territorial Army. Banks got on well with his commander, Major-general Giffard LeQuesne Martel. Banks admired his leadership and his enthusiasm for experimentation and improvisation. (Note: Martel was in the Royal Engineers, who had been involved in the development of tank warfare and their use in combat engineering, an inventor, and from 1936 assistant director of mechanisation.) In October 1939, the division was sent to the Cotswolds, and in January 1940, it was moved to France.

When Germany attacked in May, the division was heavily involved in the fighting around Arras and was later withdrawn to the coast. Banks later recalled looking out to sea from a clifftop and seeing "an awe-inspiring sight [...] A few miles away an oil tanker had been bombed or had struck a mine. Masses of the blackest smoke pillared up into a gigantic pall in the sky while in the vast lake of fire, spreading it seemed for miles on the water a flame blazed and leapt like an angry volcano [...] I was often to recall that scene in subsequent days of Flame Warfare". The division was evacuated to England.

Early in July 1940, Banks was summoned to the presence of Geoffrey Lloyd, who explained the vision that Hankey and he shared: "Flame all across Britain" he said, "ringing the coasts, spurting from the hedges and rolling down the hills. We will burn the invader back into the sea." (Note: Lloyd quoted by Banks.)

Considering Lloyd's ideas over the next few days and consulting with other soldiers, Banks found both professional scepticism and enthusiasm. Banks, a man who said he preferred the prospect of real fighting over "Whitehall warfare", was not himself keen and his first instinct was to suggest that petroleum weapons should be developed locally. Lloyd would have none of it and Banks was ordered to report to him for special duties. On 9 July, cutting through red tape, the Petroleum Warfare Department was created.

The Petroleum Warfare Department started on 9 July 1940 in three small rooms. They were independently administered and financed with a few staff entirely lacking in technical knowledge.

== Flame traps ==
Hankey and Lloyd were not alone in their interest in the development of petroleum warfare weapons; encouragement came from the highest quarters. In August, a note from the Chief Engineer's office at GHQ Home Forces read: "The PM is personally interested in it. It is something which can be provided without any adverse effect on the production of other equipment or on our War effort generally. It is unlikely that we shall have enough A/T weapons to cover all our road blocks for many months, if ever. These flame traps do at least give the Home Guard a sporting chance of frying a few Germans."

PWD took inspiration from events that happened during the retreat to Dunkirk in June 1940. One example occurred when Boulogne was attacked in the early hours of 23 May and the road to Calais was cut. In the defence of Boulogne, a group of pioneers under Lieutenant-colonel Donald Dean VC, had improvised a road block made of vehicles and piles of furniture from bombed-out houses. An approaching tank began to push its way over the obstruction, as Dean wrote:

We were prepared for this ... I had some lorry petrol tanks punctured with a pick, the tank being unable to shell us during its crushing climb, and we set fire to the lot. A sheet of flame went up, and the tank backed hastily off ... Our roadblock burned for quite a while, and allowed for a further block to be made under cover of smoke. (Note: Lieutenant-colonel Donald Dean quoted by Sebag-Montefiore.)

The newly formed department quickly made arrangements for some practical experiments at Dumpton Gap in Kent. These were the source of some excitement for witnesses, who included the pilots of enemy planes. Many of the first ideas to be tried proved fruitless, but experience quickly led to the development of the first practical weapon - the static flame trap.

=== Static flame trap ===
I lived in Longniddry from 1927 until my wife and I moved [away] ... twenty years ago. [...] It was on a platform high up in the trees opposite a dip in the road between the two old telegraph poles. My recollection is that the tank was as high as the telegraph poles. A vertical pipe from the tank was connected to a horizontal pipe fixed to the top of the wall. This pipe had a line of small holes along its length. Opening a valve inside the wood allowed the petrol to escape under a considerable pressure head.

I only saw this Flamme operated once. Army personnel for the Home Guard laid on a demonstration. The petrol valve was opened and created a huge spray, which reached the opposite side of the road. I think the original idea was that a limited amount of petrol would be released, but the valve remained open. An army Sergeant with a Very pistol fired a round (from the top of the Goods Yard) into the pool of petrol in the road dip, while fuel was still coming out at force.

It created one of the fiercest of fires I have seen, destroying the grass banks, the railway sleeper fence, scorched the telegraph poles and burned the surface off the road. Very effective! This little episode (about 1940-41) was never repeated! (Note: William J. Watt quoted by Jackson and Haire.)

An extant static flame trap tank, near Gifford, East Lothian, Scotland

A static flame trap allowed a length of road, typically 60 to 150 ft (18 to 46 m), to be covered in flame and smoke at a moment's notice. The weapon was a simple arrangement of perforated pipes placed alongside a road. The pipes were steel, 1–2 inches (25–51 millimetres) in diameter and drilled with 1/8 in (3.2 mm) holes at angles carefully calculated to cover the road evenly. The perforated pipes were connected to larger pipes that led to a tank of fuel in a raised position. The fuel mixture was 25% petrol and 75% gas-oil that was contrived to be of no use as motor vehicle fuel should it be captured. All that was required to trigger the weapon was to open a valve and for a Home Guard to throw in a Molotov cocktail creating an inferno. The ideal location for the trap was a place where vehicles could not easily escape, such as a steep-sided sunken road. Some trouble was taken with camouflage; pipes could be hidden in gutters or disguised as handrails; others were simply left as innocent-looking plumbing.

All the required pipes and valves could be obtained from the gas and water industries with little modification required beyond drilling a few holes. In general, gravity was all that was required to provide sufficient pressure for the fountains of oil but, where necessary, pumps were provided.

Later versions were a little more sophisticated; remote ignition could be achieved in a variety of ways. In one system, called the Birch Igniter, the pressure of the oil at the end of the pipe would squeeze glycerine from a rubber bulb; the glycerine would fall onto a container of potassium permanganate, which would then ignite spontaneously. Another method was to run a pair of small rubber tubes, down one of which would be passed acetylene and the other chlorine; when, at the far end, these two gases were allowed to mix, there would be a spontaneous ignition. This system had the advantage that it could be turned on and off repeatedly. The development of the flame fougasse (see below) provided a method of remote electrical ignition that could only be used once, but was virtually instantaneous.

Some 200 static flame traps were installed, mainly by the employees of oil companies whose services were placed at the disposal of the government.

=== Mobile flame traps ===
In addition to the static flame traps, mobile units were created. The main design used an otherwise redundant 200–300-imperial-gallon (910–1,360 L) tank mounted on the back of a 30 cwt lorry, just behind the cabin. In the middle of the remaining space was a petrol-driven pump and either side of this was stored 75 ft (23 m) of armoured rubber hose. Two nozzles were provided with a primitive sight and with spikes for pushing into the ground. Gas tubes for chlorine and acetylene gas were provided for ignition. The resulting jets of flame had a range of 60–70 ft (18–21 m).

Because a shortage of pumps existed – they were badly needed for fighting fires started by bombing – a simpler type of mobile flame trap was also designed. This consisted of a number of 12-inch (30 cm) diameter pipes welded shut to make a 12-foot (3.7 m) long cylindrical drum, which was filled with 43 imperial gallons (200 L) of petrol-oil mixture and pressurised with an inert gas. Five of these cylinders could be transported on the back of a vehicle, and at a weight just under 1,000 lb (450 kg), could be deployed reasonably quickly wherever an ambush was required. The cylinders would be placed at intervals along a road, each with a short length of hose leading to a nozzle secured by ground spikes. Flow was initiated by a pull string that opened a valve and ignition was provided by Molotov cocktails.

=== Flame fougasse ===
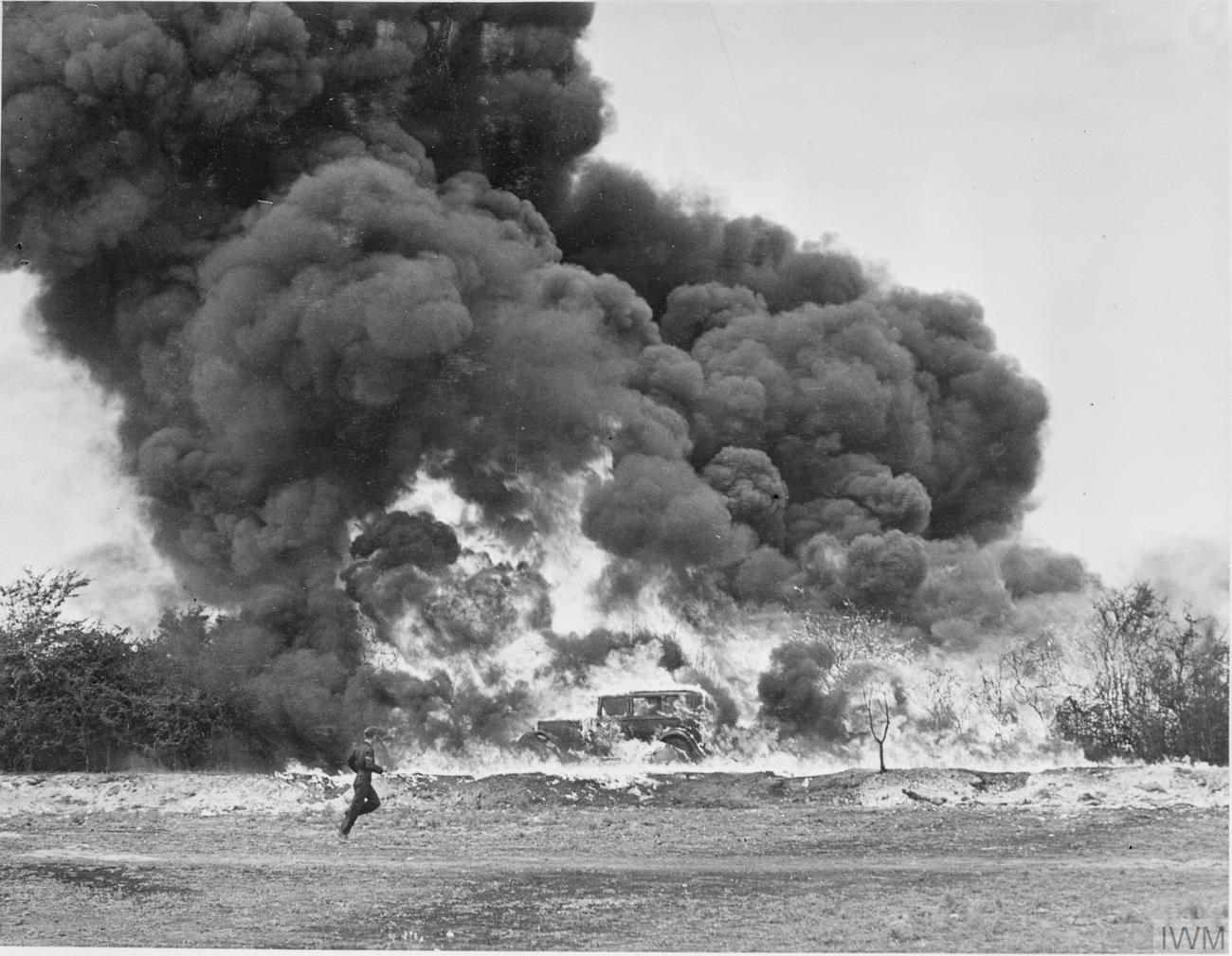
A demonstration of "fougasse", somewhere in Britain: A car is surrounded in flames and a huge cloud of smoke, circa 1940.

The Petroleum Warfare Department soon received the assistance of Henry Newton (Note: See Newton 6-inch mortar and Weaponry, Inventions and Improvements by Captain H Newton during the First World War.) and William Howard Livens, both known for designing mortars during the First World War.

During the First World War, Livens had developed a number of chemical-warfare and flame-throwing weapons. The largest of his works was the Livens large-gallery flame projector, which could project burning fuel 50–60 m (160–200 ft). His best-known invention was the Livens projector: a simple mortar that could throw a projectile containing about 30 lb (14 kg) of explosives, incendiary oil, or most commonly, poisonous phosgene gas. The great advantage of the Livens projector was that it was cheap; this allowed hundreds, and on occasions thousands, to be set up and then fired simultaneously, catching the enemy by surprise. Both Livens and Newton experimented with field-expedient versions of the Livens projector using commercially available five-gallon drums and tubes. Newton experimented with firing milk bottles filled with phosphorus using a rifle. None of these experiments were taken forward.

However, one of Livens' PWD demonstrations, probably first seen about mid-July at Dumpton Gap, was more promising. (Note: Livens had briefly experimented with a similar weapons during the First World War.) A barrel of oil was simply blown up on the beach; Lloyd was said to have been particularly impressed when he observed a party of high-ranking officers witnessing a test from the top of a cliff making "an instantaneous and precipitate movement to the rear". The work was dangerous. Livens and Banks were experimenting with five-gallon drums in the shingle at Hythe when a short circuit triggered several weapons. By good fortune, the battery of drums where the party was standing failed to go off.

The experiments led to a particularly promising arrangement - a 40-gallon steel drum (Note: Although the standard capacity is 44 imperial gallons (55 US gallons), historical records generally refer to 40-gallon drums and sometimes 50-gallon drums apparently interchangeably.) buried in an earthen bank with just the round front end exposed. At the back of the drum was an explosive which, when triggered, ruptured the drum and shot a jet of flame about 10 ft (3.0 m) wide and 30 yd (27 m) long. The design was reminiscent of a weapon dating from late medieval times called a fougasse - a hollow in which was placed a barrel of gunpowder covered by rocks, the explosives to be detonated by a fuse at an opportune moment. Livens' new weapon was duly dubbed the flame fougasse. The flame fougasse was demonstrated to Clement Attlee (Lord Privy Seal), Maurice Hankey, and General Liardet (GOC 56th Division) on 20 July 1940.

A variant of the flame fougasse called the "demi-gass" was a fougasse barrel placed horizontally in the open with an explosive charge underneath that would rupture the barrel and flip it over towards the target. Another variant was the "hedge hopper", a fougasse barrel on its end with an explosive charge underneath that would send it bounding over a hedge or wall; this made the hedge hopper particularly easy to conceal. A further variant of the hedge hopper idea was devised for St Margaret's Bay, where the barrels would be sent rolling over the cliff edge.

In all, some 50,000 flame fougasse barrels were distributed, of which the great majority were installed in one of 7,000 batteries mostly in southern England and a little later at 2,000 sites in Scotland. Some barrels were held in reserve, while others were deployed at storage sites to destroy fuel depots at short notice. The size of a battery varied from just one drum to as many as 14; a four-barrel battery was the most common installation and the recommended minimum. Where possible, half the barrels in a battery were to contain the 40/60 mixture and half the sticky 5B mixture.

== Troubled waters ==
=== Operation Lucid ===
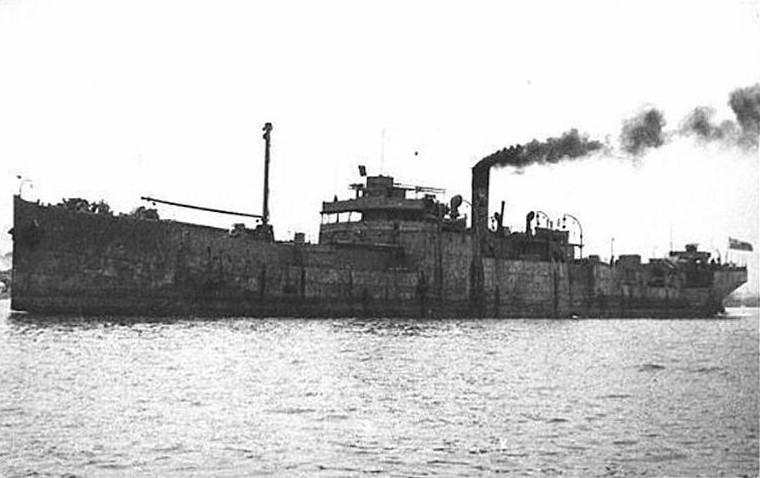
RFA War Nawab, one of the ships involved in Operation Lucid

A series of experiments investigated the possibility of burning the invader's barges before they could reach the English shore. The first idea was simply to explode a vessel filled with oil, and this was tried at Maplin Sands, where a Thames oil tanker, Suffolk, with 50 tonnes of petroleum, was blown up in shallow water. Another idea developed was that the oil should be held in place on the water by a trough formed from coir matting. A machine formed the trough from a flat mat as it was payed out over the stern of a ship. Trials with the Ben Hann produced a flaming ribbon 880 yards long and 6 feet wide (800 m × 2 m) that could be towed at four knots. Neither of these experiments were carried forward to produce workable defences.

The Suffolk did, however, provide a trial run for an even more ambitious idea - the invasion barges would be burned even before they left port. The plan was first floated in early June/July 1940 and became known as Operation Lucid.

Three old tankers were quickly prepared as fire ships for the operation under the command of Augustus Agar VC with Morgan Morgan-Giles as his staff officer. Each ship was laden with over 2,000 tons of flammable oils and a miscellany of leftover explosive devices. Although the operation was started several times in September–October 1940, the attempts were thwarted by bad weather, unreliable ships, and finally, one of the destroyers in the group was damaged by a mine. By November, any invasion plan had been called off and Lucid was shelved.

=== Burning seas ===
During August the corpses of about forty German soldiers were washed up at scattered points along the coast between the Isle of Wight and Cornwall. The Germans had been practising embarkations in the barges along the French coast. Some of these barges put out to sea in order to escape British bombing and were sunk, either by bombing or bad weather. This was the source of a widespread rumour that the Germans had attempted an invasion and had suffered very heavy losses either by drowning or by being burnt in patches of sea covered with flaming oil. We took no steps to contradict such tales, which spread freely through the occupied countries in a wildly exaggerated form and gave much encouragement to the oppressed populations.

— Winston Churchill

From its earliest days, the PWD experimented with "setting the sea on fire" by burning oil that was floating on the surface. It was immediately appreciated that the possibilities of such a weapon lay not only in its ability to destroy the enemy, but also in the propaganda value of the terror of fire.

In 1938, an Enemy Publicity Section, created for propaganda to be sent to the enemy, was formed by Hankey and a new section was formed under Sir Campbell Stuart, who was a former editor of The Times newspaper. Being allocated premises at Electra House, the new section was dubbed Department EH. During the Munich crisis of 1938, a number of leaflets were printed with the intention of dropping them over Germany. The leaflet drop never took place, but the exercise prompted Department EH to issue a note to the Air Ministry insisting on the importance of a properly coordinated system for sending information to enemy countries. The Permanent Secretary (most senior civil servant of a department) at the Air Ministry to whom the note was addressed was Sir Donald Banks, who would later head the PWD.

On 25 September 1939, Department EH was mobilised to Woburn Abbey where it joined another subversion team known as Section D that had been formed by Major Laurence Grand.

In July 1940, Prime Minister Winston Churchill invited Hugh Dalton to take charge of the newly formed Special Operations Executive (SOE). The mission of the SOE was to encourage and facilitate espionage and sabotage behind enemy lines, or as Churchill put, it: to "set Europe ablaze". Among those present at the first summit meeting of SOE on 1 July 1940 were Lord Hankey, Geoffrey Lloyd and Desmond Morton – people who would be instrumental in the formation of the PWD just a few days later.

Department EH and section D later became SO1 and SO2 of the SOE. Subsequently, in September 1941, responsibilities for political warfare was taken away from the SOE with the formation of the Political Warfare Executive.

Although PWD would go on to work on burning floating oil, a plan was hatched to spread the story that such a weapon already existed even before the first trials were performed. Writer James Hayward has made an extensive study of this curious story; in The Bodies on the Beach, Hayward makes a compelling case for the view that the burning seas work was driven substantially by the needs of propaganda and was a sophisticated bluff that became Britain's first major propaganda success of the war. Writing just after the war, Banks said, "Perhaps the greatest contribution from all these variegated efforts was in building up the great propaganda story of the Flame Defence of Britain which swept the Continent of Europe in 1940."

The details of the story indicated the invention of a bomb that would spread a thin film of volatile liquid on the surface of the water and then ignite it. This rumour was spread in neutral cities such as Stockholm, Lisbon, Madrid, Cairo, Istanbul, Ankara, New York, and other places, probably around late July or early August 1940. Soon, interrogation of captured Luftwaffe pilots revealed that the rumour had become common knowledge.

German armed forces began experimenting with burning floating oil. On 18 August, they ignited 100 tons of floating oil; it burned for 20 minutes producing heat and copious smoke – this was almost a week before the first successful British ignition.

In Europe, the burning-seas story became embellished to the point where the story included a German invasion attempt thwarted by the ignition of oil on water. American war correspondent William Lawrence Shirer was based in Berlin at the time, but in mid-September, he visited Geneva, Switzerland.

News coming over the near-by border of France is that the Germans have attempted a landing in Britain, but that it has been repulsed with heavy German losses. Must take this report with a grain of salt.

On the evening of the following day, Shirer arrived back in Berlin:

I noticed several lightly wounded soldiers, mostly airmen, getting off a special car which had been attached to our train. From their bandages, the wounds looked like burns. I noticed also the longest Red Cross train I've ever seen. It stretched from the station for half a mile to beyond the bridge over the Landwehr Canal. [...] I wondered where so many wounded could have come from, as the armies in the west stopped fighting three months ago. As there were only a few porters I had to wait some time on the platform and picked up a conversation with a railway workman. He said most of the men taken from the hospital train were suffering from burns. Can it be that the tales I heard in Geneva had some truth in them after all? The stories there were that either in attempted German raids with sizable landing-parties on the English coast or in rehearsals with boats and barges off the French coast the British had given the Germans a bad pummelling. The reports reaching Switzerland from France were that many German barges and ships had been destroyed and a considerable number of German troops drowned; also that the British used a new type of wireless-directed torpedo (a Swiss invention, the Swiss said) which spread ignited oil on the water and burned the barges. Those cases of burns at the station this morning bear looking into.

The following day, Shirer heard about further train loads of wounded soldiers. A plausible explanation for these wounded is that they were hurt in RAF bombing raids on ports of embarkation. Such raids were certainly going on, though it seems they were generally fairly ineffective and no records of significant German casualties have been turned up. It seems likely that the rumour machine inflated light casualties to proportions of strategic consequence.

The British were getting better organised. A system was set up to collect suggestions for Inspired Rumours; these suggestions, which became known as SIBS (from the Latin sibilare, to hiss). SIBS, were sifted through at weekly meetings in order that they should present a consistent message and to ensure that ludicrously improbable and inadvertently true rumours were filtered out. New SIBS included "small scale attempts at invasion have been made and have been beaten off with devastating losses. In fact none are alive to tell. Thousands of floating German corpses have been washed ashore." and "The fishing populations of the west coast of Denmark and the south coast of Norway are selling fish but they won't eat them. The reason is that there are numbers of German corpses on which the fish feed. There have even been cases of shreds of clothing and buttons, etc. being found inside the fish."

The story of the burning seas was further reinforced. In October, the RAF dropped leaflets containing handy phrases for visitors to the United Kingdom in German, French, and Dutch. The phrases included "the sea smells of petrol here", "the sea even burns here", "see how well the captain burns", "Karl/Willi/Fritz/Johann/Abraham: cremated/drowned/minced by the propellers!" As Hayward explains, these leaflets were simply building on and reinforcing the rumours of a failed invasion attempt that were being disseminated around the world from late September. The original propaganda was conflated with other events both real and imaginary and the rumours spread. Of course, the German command knew that the stories were untrue; the real targets of the propaganda were the men who might actually be asked to attempt a landing in England. Berlin felt forced officially to deny the rumours:

CHANNEL LOSSES DENIED: Berlin, September 25th (AP) – Authorised German sources said today that there was no truth in reports that many thousands of bodies of German soldiers were being washed ashore along the English Channel. Such accounts were declared to be an indication of a situation that compels the British 'to put out such silly lies'.

Inevitably, the story made its way back to the UK. Publication of the contents of propaganda leaflets dropped by the RAF was not permitted and other stories such as an official statement from the Free French Information Service through the Ministry of Information saying that "30,000 Germans drowning in an attempted embarkation last September" were suppressed. Vivid and plausible accounts of a thwarted invasion were published in American newspapers and the rumours spread in Britain and proved persistent. Questions were even asked in parliament. Writing just after the war, the Chief Press Censor, Rear Admiral George Pirie Thomson said that "... in the whole course of the war there was no story which gave me so much trouble as this one of the attempted German invasion, flaming oil on the water and 30,000 burned Germans."

On 7 September 1940, the Battle of Britain was still raging, but the German Air Force (Luftwaffe) changed its tactics and started to bomb London. With the accumulation of invasion barges and favourable tides, the authorities were convinced that invasion was imminent, the codeword Cromwell was passed to the Army and Home Forces. The codeword was only meant to indicate "invasion imminent", but with a nation tense with expectation and some Home Guardsmen incompletely briefed, some believed that the invasion had started and this caused great confusion. In some areas, church bells were rung on receipt of the codeword even though this was only supposed to happen when invaders were in the immediate area. Roadblocks were set up, some bridges blown, and land mines sown on some roads (killing three Guards officers). Home Guard units searched beaches for invasion barges and scanned the skies for approaching German paratroopers, but none came. Public recollection of these events did much to reinforce the idea that some kind of landing had, in fact, been attempted.

The burning sea lie provided the British with their first major black propaganda victory. The compelling story is likely to be the basis of a number of invasion myths that remained in circulation throughout the remainder of the 20th century, that the Germans attempted an invasion which was thwarted by the use of sea-burning bombs. The most persistent of these stories becoming known as the Shingle Street Mystery named after an isolated village on the Suffolk coast.

=== Flame barrage ===
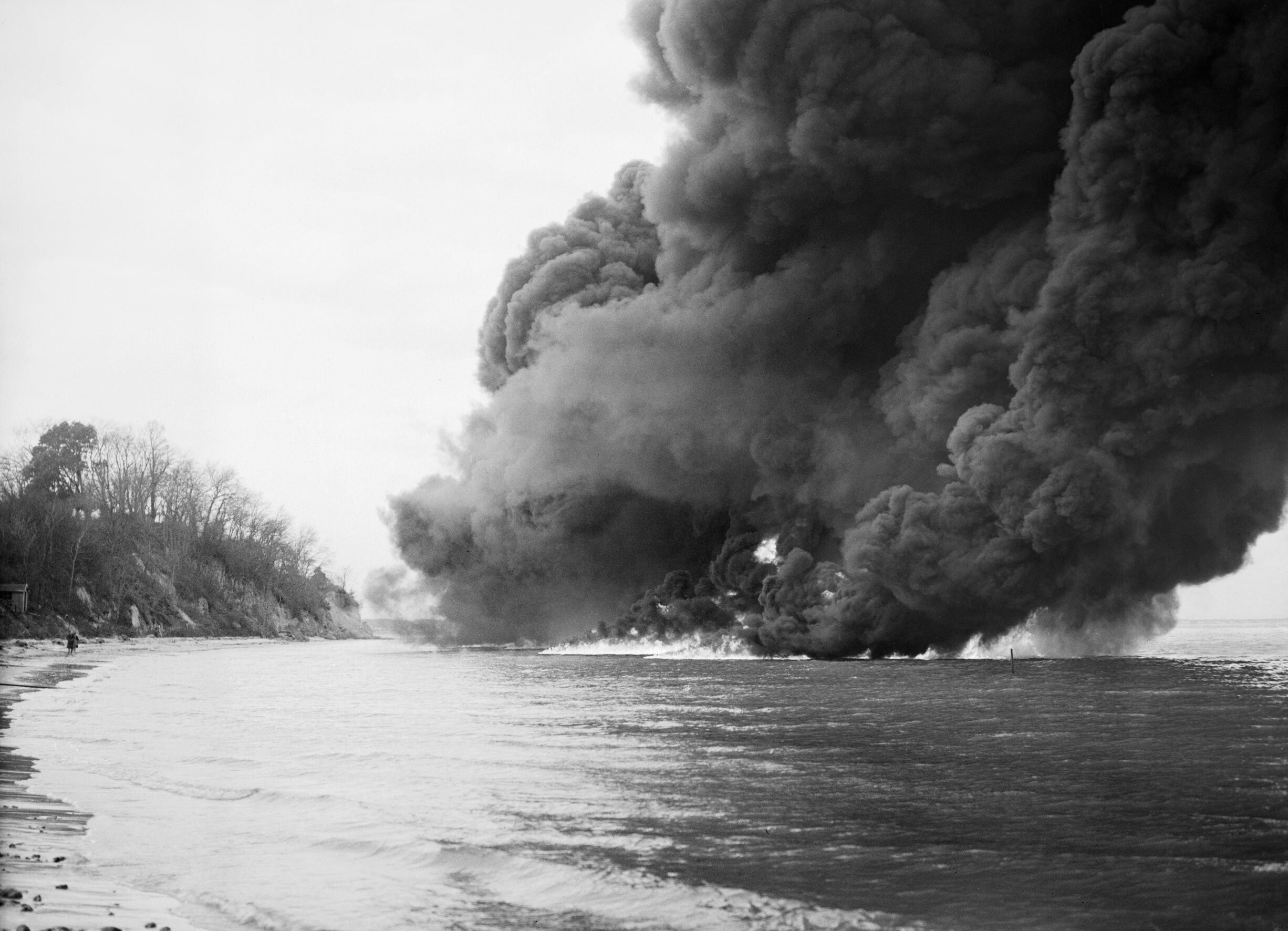
A flame barrage demonstration on the sea at Studland Bay, Dorset

Propaganda aside, the efforts of the PWD were real enough; they continued with experiments to actually set the sea on fire. Although initial tests were discouraging, Geoffrey Lloyd was reluctant to let the matter go. On 24 August 1940, on the northern shores of the Solent, near Titchfield, 10 tanker wagons began to pump oil down pipes running from the top of a 30-foot-high (10 m) cliff down into the water at the rate of about 12 tons/hour. In front of many spectators, the oil was ignited by flares and a system of sodium and petrol pellets. In a matter of seconds, a raging wall of flame was produced; the intense heat caused the water to boil and people at the cliff edge were obliged to retreat. The demonstration was very dramatic, but it was not an unqualified success because the circumstances were improbably favourable; in the sheltered waters of the Solent, the sun-warmed sea was calm and the winds light. A lengthy series of experiments continued with many reverses; in one case, the pipes attached to "Admiralty scaffolding"' (an antitank barrier of scaffolding placed in the shallows) were torn up in a storm and in another incident sappers were blown up by beach mines. It was found that effectiveness was very much affected by sea conditions; a low temperature made ignition more difficult and waves would quickly break up the oil into small ineffectual slicks.

On 20 December 1940, Generals Harold Alexander and Bernard Montgomery and many other senior officers gathered for a demonstration. The performance was completely unconvincing with just a few small pools of burning oil battered by the surf. The cold, cloudy weather matched the mood of pessimism; Banks describes this day as the Black Friday in the annals of the PWD.

General Alexander was sympathetic to the PWD's problems, and suggested that the pipes be moved to a point immediately above the high tide point and, after several months of further work, this proved to be the solution – oil sprayed and burnt over rather than on the water. On 24 February 1941, the Chiefs of Staff committee, that included General Brooke, watched films of the recent experiments and approved the installation of 50 miles of flame barrage - 25 miles on the south-eastern coast, 15 miles on the eastern, and 10 miles on the southern commands.

Although Geoffrey Lloyd, Secretary for Petroleum, was enthusiastic, General Brooke was, on reflection, not convinced of its efficacy. Brooke's main objections were that the weapon was dependent upon favourable winds, it created a smokescreen that might favour the enemy, and it was very vulnerable to bombing and shell fire; in any case, it was of short duration. The required resources were considerable and a serious shortage of materials existed; lack of support from authorities and the competing demands for supplies meant that the plans were cut back to thirty miles of barrage, then fifteen and then less than ten miles. According to Banks: "Lengths of this flame defence ultimately were completed at Deal between Kingsdown and Sandwich, at St. Margaret's Bay, at Shakespeare Cliff near Dover railway tunnel, at Rye where a remarkable system of remote control across the marshes was installed, and at Studland Bay. In South Wales long stretches were put in hand at the time when the airborne threat to Ireland was looming large, and sections at Wick and Thurso, but these were not brought to completion. In Cornwall at Porthcurno, where the important transatlantic cables came ashore, a gravity fed section was put in as a security measure against raids."

== Portable flamethrowers ==
During World War I, the British had developed flamethrowers. Banks had seen the Livens large-gallery flame projector used at the Somme in July 1916 and a large-scale flamethrower had been installed on HMS Vindictive and used in the raid on Zeebrugge. Portable flame-throwing apparatus was also designed, but the war ended before it could be fully employed; further development ceased and records of the work were lost.

Work restarted in 1939 at the newly formed Ministry of Supply Research Department at Woolwich, and many of the basic technical problems were investigated such as the design of valves and nozzles, the problem of ignition, and of fuels and propellants. Independently, Commander Marsden was working on portable flamethrowers for the Army. His work eventually resulted in the semiportable "Harvey" flamethrower and the backpack "Marsden" flamethrower. Meanwhile, the PWD developed the Home Guard flamethrower as a quickly extemporised weapon.

=== Home Guard flamethrower ===
The so-called Home Guard flamethrower was not a flamethrower in the conventional sense, but a small, semimobile flame trap.

From about September 1940, 300 Home Guard units received a kit of parts provided by the PWD - a 50 to 65 imp gal (230 to 300 L) barrel, 100 ft (30 m) of hose, a hand pump, some connective plumbing, and a set of do-it-yourself instructions. The barrel was set upon an eight-and-a-half-foot-long (2.6 m) hand cart that was made locally from four-by-two-inch timber and mounted on a pair of wheels salvaged from a car axle. The nozzle and ground spike were of simple construction from sections of three-quarter-inch-diameter gas pipe with a used food can over the end to catch drips of fuel that would maintain a flame when the pressure was allowed to drop. When completed, the weapon was filled with a 40/60 mixture obtained locally.

The Home Guard flamethrower was light enough to be wheeled along roads and possibly over fields to where it was needed by its crew of five or six men. It would be used as part of an ambush in combination with Molotov cocktails and whatever other weapons were available. The pump was operated by hand and would give a flame of up to 60 ft (18 m) in length, but only for about two minutes of continuous operation.

=== Harvey flamethrower ===
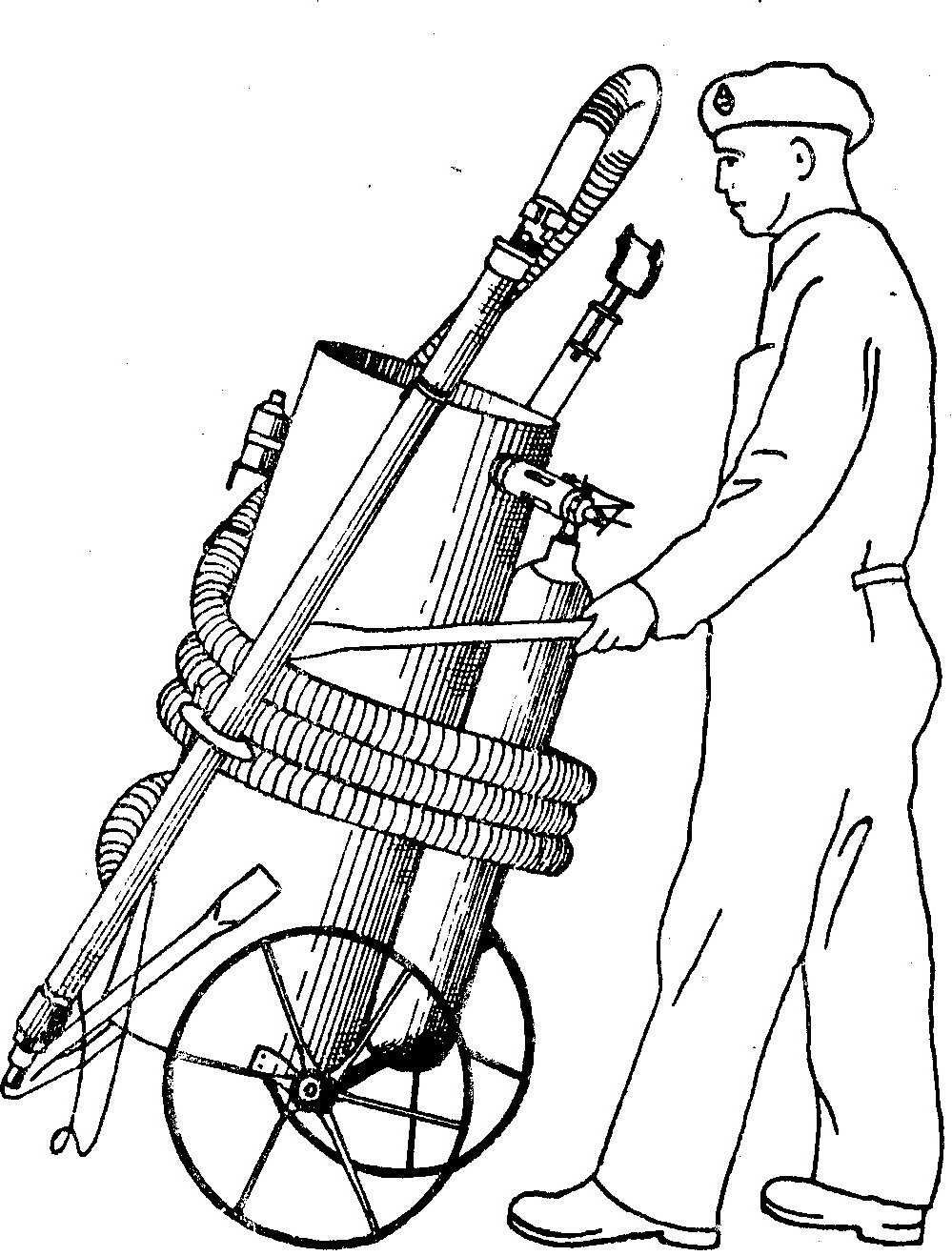
Transport

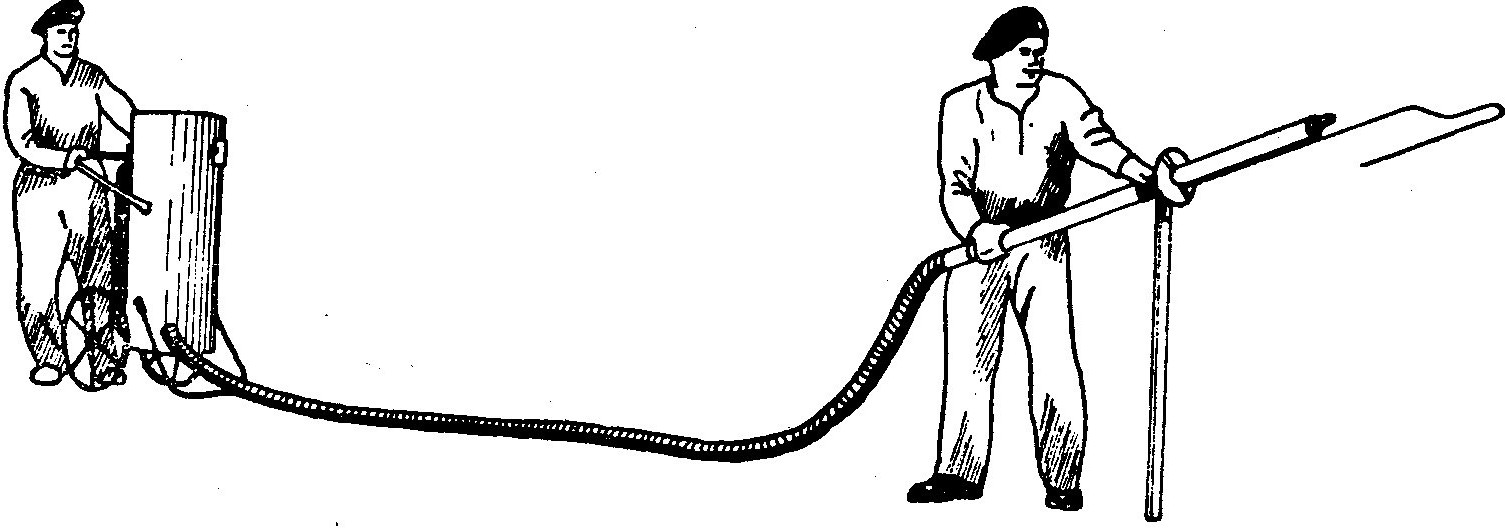
In use

Harvey flamethrower

The Harvey flamethrower was introduced in August 1940, and was mostly made from readily available parts such as wheels from agricultural equipment manufacturers and commercially available compressed air cylinders. It comprised a welded-steel cylinder containing 22 gallons (100 L) of creosote and a standard bottle of compressed nitrogen at 1,800 pounds per square inch (120 bar) mounted on a sack truck of the type that a railway-station porter might use. About 25 ft (7.6 m) of armoured hose provided the connection to a four-foot-long (1.2 m) lance with a nozzle and some paraffin-soaked cotton waste that was set alight to provide a source of ignition. In operation, the pressure in the fuel container was raised to about 100 psi (6.9 bar), causing a cork in the nozzle to be ejected followed by a jet of fuel lasting about 10 seconds at a range up to 60 ft (18 m). Like the Home Guard flamethrower, it was intended as an ambush weapon, but in this case the operator was able to direct the flames by moving the lance which would be pushed through a hole in otherwise bulletproof cover such as a brick wall.

=== Marsden flamethrower ===
The Marsden flamethrower, probably introduced about June 1941, comprised a backpack with four imperial gallons (18 L) of fuel pressurised to 400 pounds per square inch (28 bar) by compressed nitrogen gas; the backpack was connected to a "gun" by means of a flexible tube, and the weapon was operated by a simple lever. The weapon could give 12 seconds of flame divided into any number of individual spurts. The Marsden flamethrower was heavy and cumbersome; 1500 were made but few were issued.

Neither the Harvey nor the Marsden was popular with the Army; both ended up with the Home Guard. The Marsden was superseded in 1943 by the Flamethrower, Portable, No 2 which became known as the "lifebuoy" flamethrower from the ring shape of the fuel tank.

== Vehicle-mounted flamethrowers ==
=== Cockatrice ===
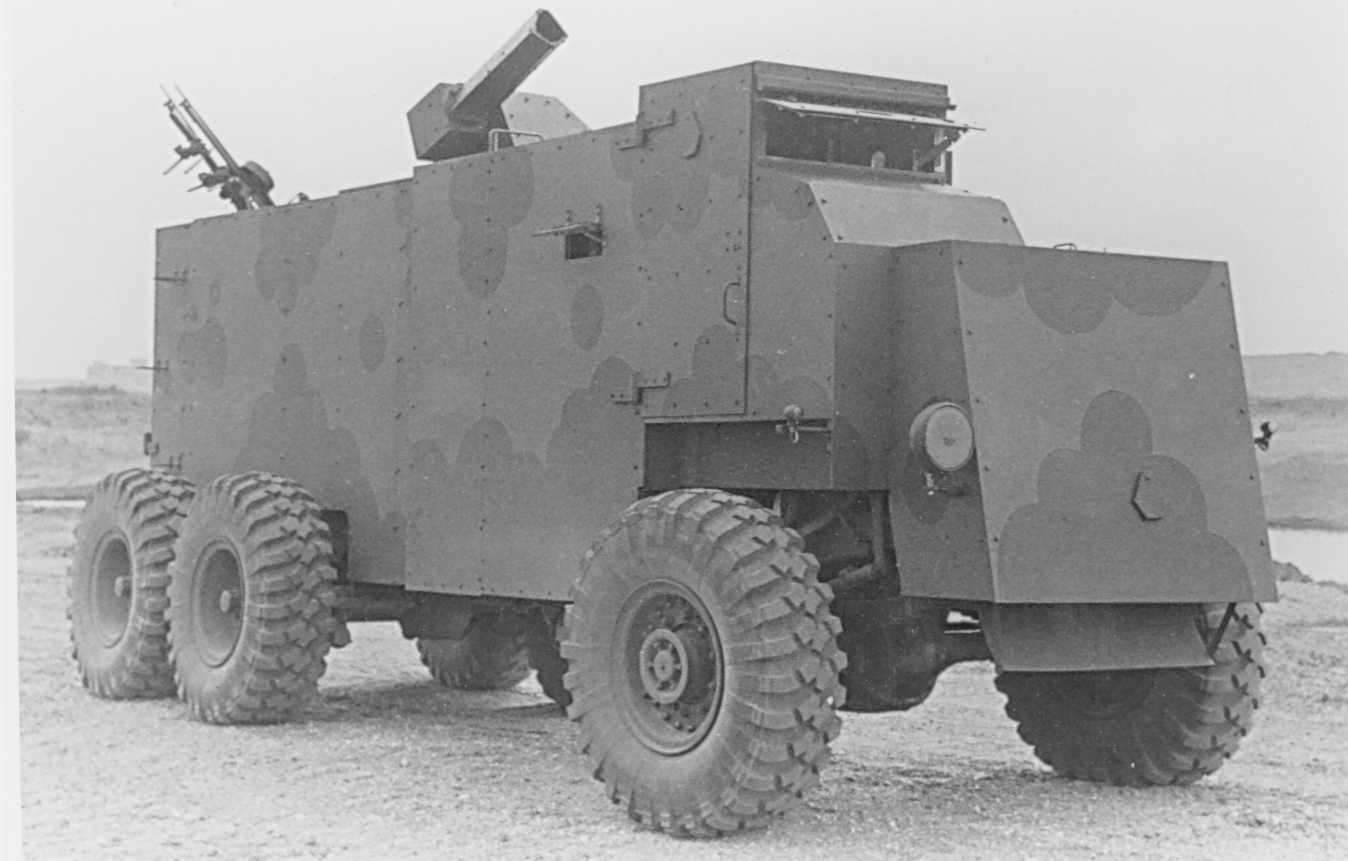
Mk I A Heavy Cockatrice

The PWD brought together and supervised a number of independent developments of vehicle-mounted flamethrowers. The first product of this work was a prototype of Cockatrice that was demonstrated in August 1940. Reginald Fraser of Imperial College, London University, who was also a director of the Lagonda car company, developed an annular flamethrower, that threw petrol with an outer layer of thickened fuel. He thought that this would reduce the risk of fire working backwards to the fuel tank because oxygen would not be present. With the encouragement of the PWD, Fraser produced and demonstrated a prototype at Snoddington Furze in August 1940. Fraser went on to have an experimental vehicle put together by Lagonda on a Commer lorry chassis. A demonstration of the Lagonda vehicle at PWD's test site at Moody Down farm near Winchester was attended by Nevil Shute Norway and Lieutenant Jack Cooke of the Admiralty Directorate of Miscellaneous Weapons Development. Norway later recalled, "It was a terrifying apparatus ... [It] fired a mixture of diesel oil and tar and had a range of about 100 yards. It had a flame 30 feet in diameter and used 8 gallons of fuel a second ... When demonstrated to admirals and generals, it usually appalled and horrified them ..." (Note: Norway quoted by Pawle.)

Norway understood that invading airborne troops landing at an airfield would need about one minute after touchdown while they prepared their equipment, in which time they would be extremely vulnerable; a flamethrower on a vehicle that could be driven at speed could envelop the enemy in fire before the vehicle itself was destroyed. Cooke worked on the problem and the result was "Cockatrice". This device had a rotating weapon mount with elevation to 90° and a range around 100 yd (91 m), stored about two tons of fuel and used compressed carbon monoxide as a propellant. The Light Cockatrices variant was based on an armoured Bedford QL vehicle with flame–projector; sixty of these were ordered for the protection of Royal Naval Air Stations. The Heavy Cockatrice was based on the larger AEC Matador 6×6 chassis already in RAF service as a fuel bowser; six of these were constructed for RAF airfield defence. Other than having a larger fuel tank, the Heavy Cockatrice was the same vehicle. The Army showed little interest in Cockatrice, and it never went into mass production. (Note: The Cockatrice vehicle weighed over 12 tons and was very difficult to bring to a sudden stop. In one notable incident, when returning from trials and on turning at a bend in the road, a driver found his way blocked by temporary barrier. Unable to stop, the driver crashed through the roadblock and the soldiers guarding the barrier opened fire. Incensed, the Cockatrice crew retaliated with a jet of fire resulting in "an eventful few moments".)

The flamethrower from Cockatrice was also deployed on a number of small ships. German pilots were in the habit of attacking coastal vessels, flying in very low hoping to avoid detection and dropping their bombs before flying over the ship at mast height. Norway thought that a vertical flamethrower might discourage such attacks. An experiment with a Cockatrice-like flamethrower on board La Patrie, the flame's length was increased by the up-draft of the heat generated so that the pillar of fire reached 300 ft (91 m) vertically. A pilot was found to make dummy attacks, flying closer and closer with each pass he eventually had his wingtip virtually in the flame. Norway was disheartened to find that the pilot was not more deterred by the flames, but the pilot had been briefed to know what to expect. In a later trial with a pilot who had not been told about the flame weapon, Norway was dismayed to see that he flew with half a wing cutting into the flame. This pilot had worked for a stunt firm, so was used to driving cars "through plates of glass and walls of fire". Despite these discouraging results, the flamethrower was installed on a number of coastal vessels. Although seemingly unable to do any real damage, intelligence sources indicated that the height of attacks went up well above 200 ft (61 m).

The Admiralty also ordered a version of Cockatrice that could be taken from a lorry and mounted on a landing craft to make a landing craft assault (flame thrower) or LCA(FT). The LCA(FT) does not appear to have been used in action. A successor to Cockatrice called Basilisk was designed with improved cross-country performance, for use with armoured car regiments, but it was not adopted and only a prototype was produced.

=== Ronson ===
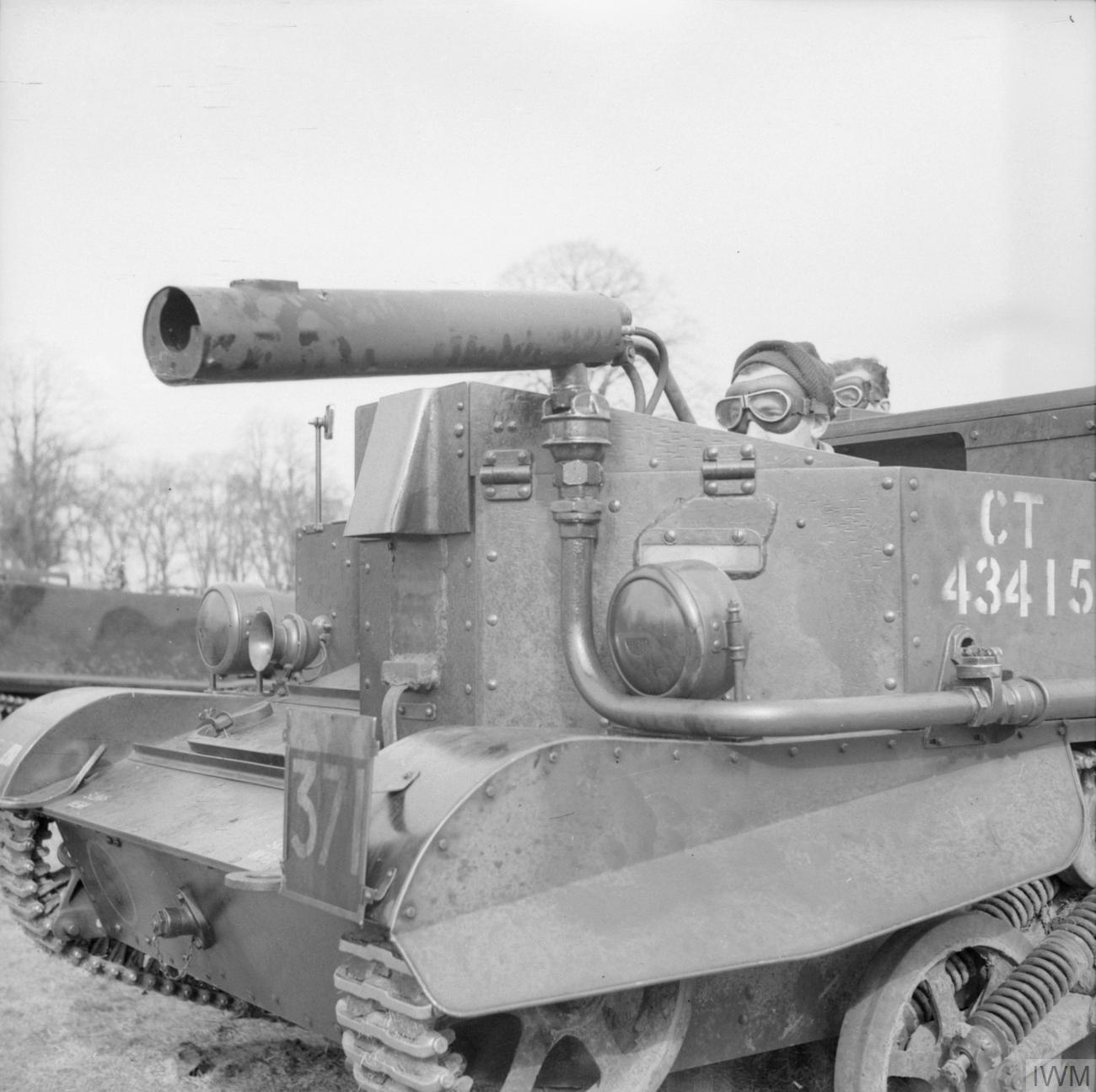
The Ronson flamethrower mounted on a Universal Carrier, seen at a demonstration of flame weapons in Scotland, March 1942.

The first British vehicle mounted flamethrower for regular army use was developed in 1940 by the then newly established PWD. This flamethrower was known as the Ronson after the cigarette lighter manufacturer of the same name known for its stylish and dependable cigarette lighter products. Fraser developed the Ronson from his original Cockatrice prototypes. The Ronson was mounted on a Universal Carrier which was an open topped, lightly armoured tracked vehicle. The Ronson had fuel and compressed gas mounted tanks over the rear of the vehicle. The British Army turned the design down for various reasons but specifically requiring greater range.

Early in August the specification was settled and put in hand by Logondas and in November it was careening about the Moody Downs, ridden cowboy fashion by Canadians with the governors off the engines. The élan of the 'Ronson Cavalry,' as they called themselves, was tremendously inspiring. Later they carried it across the Channel, emulating their fathers of the Canadian Light Cavalry in 1918 in many a hard-fought action in the Low Countries.—Donald Banks

Lieutenant-General Andrew McNaughton, commander of Canadian forces in Britain, was an imaginative officer with a keen eye for potential new weapons. He played a significant part in the development of flamethrowers and ordered 1,300 Ronsons on his own initiative. The Canadians eventually developed the Wasp Mk IIC (see below) which became the preferred model. The Ronson was also attached to the Churchill tank. Fraser was told that a tank was preferable to the Universal Carrier as a mount for a flamethrower, because it was very much less vulnerable. A Churchill MkII tank was modified as a prototype by 24 March 1942, it had a pair of Ronson projectors one on either side of the front of the hull, they could not be aimed except by moving the entire vehicle. Fuel was held in a pair of containers projecting from the rear of the vehicle. Major J. M. Oke contributed to the design, including a suggestion that the fuel be held in the reserve fuel tank – a lightly armoured standard fitting available for the Churchill tank. The design was reduced to a single flame projector and became known as the Churchill Oke. Three Churchill Okes were included as part of the tank support for the Dieppe Raid but did not get to use the flamethrowers in combat.

From the Canadians, the Ronson came to the attention of the United States who later developed it use as a replacement for the main gun on obsolete M3A1 tank, a weapon that was called Satan. Later, other models of the M3 Stuart were fitted with similar flamethrowers alongside the main armament. Satan and others would see action in the Pacific War and during Operation Overlord.

=== Wasp ===
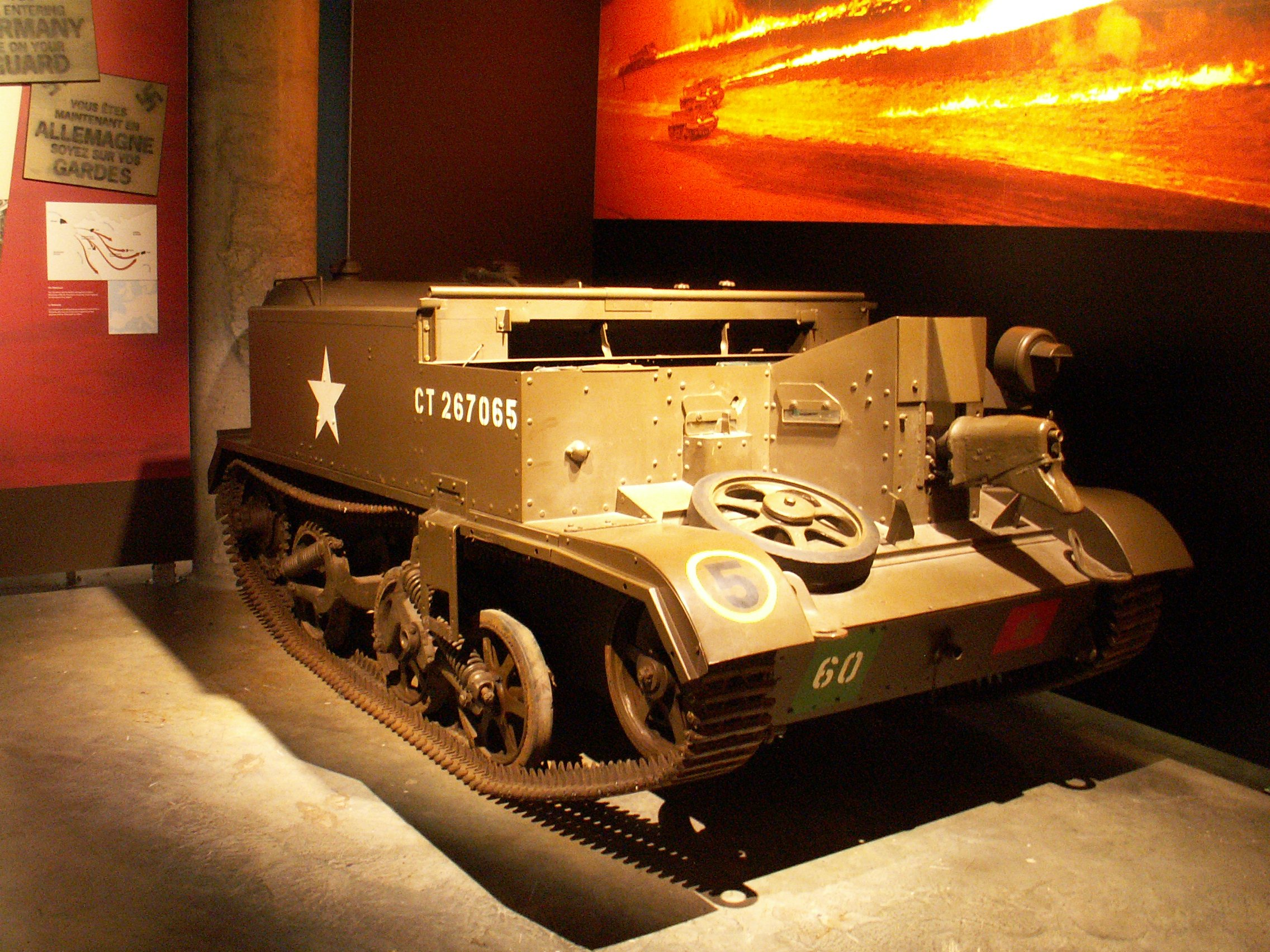
Wasp Mk IIC, flamethrower-equipped variant of the British Universal Carrier. Note rear mounted fuel tank and flame projector in place of the front machine gun.

By 1942 the PWD had developed the Ronson flamethrowers so that a range of 80–100 yd (73–91 m) was achieved. In September 1942, this improved appliance was put into production as the Wasp Mk I. An order for 1,000 was placed and all had been delivered by November 1943. The Wasp Mk I had two fuel tanks located inside the carrier's hull and used a large projector gun that was mounted over the top of the carrier. The Mk I was immediately outdated by the development of the Wasp Mk II which had a much handier flame projector mounted at the front on the machine-gun mounting. Although there was no improvement in range, this version performed much better being easier to aim and much safer to use.

The Wasp Mk II went into action during the Invasion of Normandy in July 1944. The Wasps were used mainly in support of infantry operations, whereas the Crocodile was used with armoured formations. They were extremely effective weapons, dreaded by the Germans who had to bear their effects; because of the fear of these flamethrowers, infantry opposition often ceased when they arrived. It was not long before the Wasp Mk IIs were joined by yet another Wasp variant, this one having been developed by the Canadians and denoted Mk IIC. The Canadians had determined that devoting a Universal Carrier exclusively to the flamethrower role was inefficient and they redesigned the Wasp so that the carrier could also function in its normal manner. This was achieved by removing the internal fuel tanks and replacing them with a single tank externally mounted at the back of the vehicle. This allowed room inside for a third crew member who could carry a light machine gun. The Mk IIC was much more tactically flexible and it gradually became the favoured type. In June 1944 all Wasp production was changed to the Mk IIC and existing MK IIs were also adapted to this standard. Experience demonstrated the need for more frontal armour and many Wasp Mk IICs were fitted with plastic armour over the front plates.

=== Valentine ===
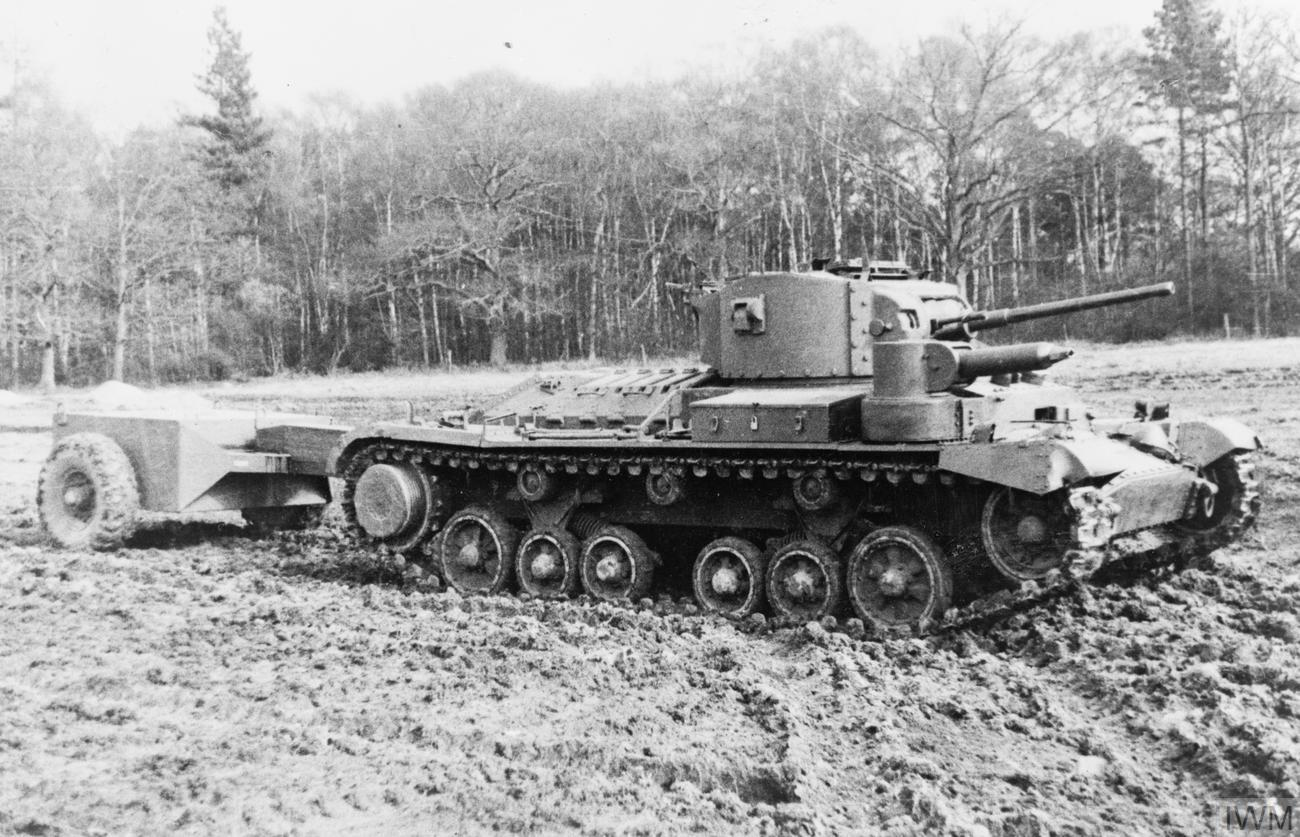
Valentine flamethrower (cordite-operated equipment)

George John Rackham, an ex-Tank Corps officer and tank designer who was a bus designer at Associated Equipment Company (AEC), developed a flamethrower that became known as the Heavy Pump Unit. One version consisted of a Worthington Simpson Pump driven by a Rolls-Royce Kestrel engine and another used a Mather and Platt pump powered by a Napier Lion engine. Projecting liquid at 750 imperial gallons (3,400 L) per minute it produced an awe-inspiring jet of flame. The Heavy Pump Unit was mounted on an AEC 6×6 chassis and there was also a small projector on a two-wheeled carriage that could be towed and then manhandled by the crew as far as the hose would stretch. A demonstration of the Heavy Pump Unit on the lawns around Leeds Castle in Kent were witnessed by the Secretary of State for War, Lord Margesson. Shortly afterwards General Alec Richardson, Director of Armoured Fighting Vehicles and the War Office, saw a similar demonstration and the PWD were soon asked for a similar weapon mounted on a tank.

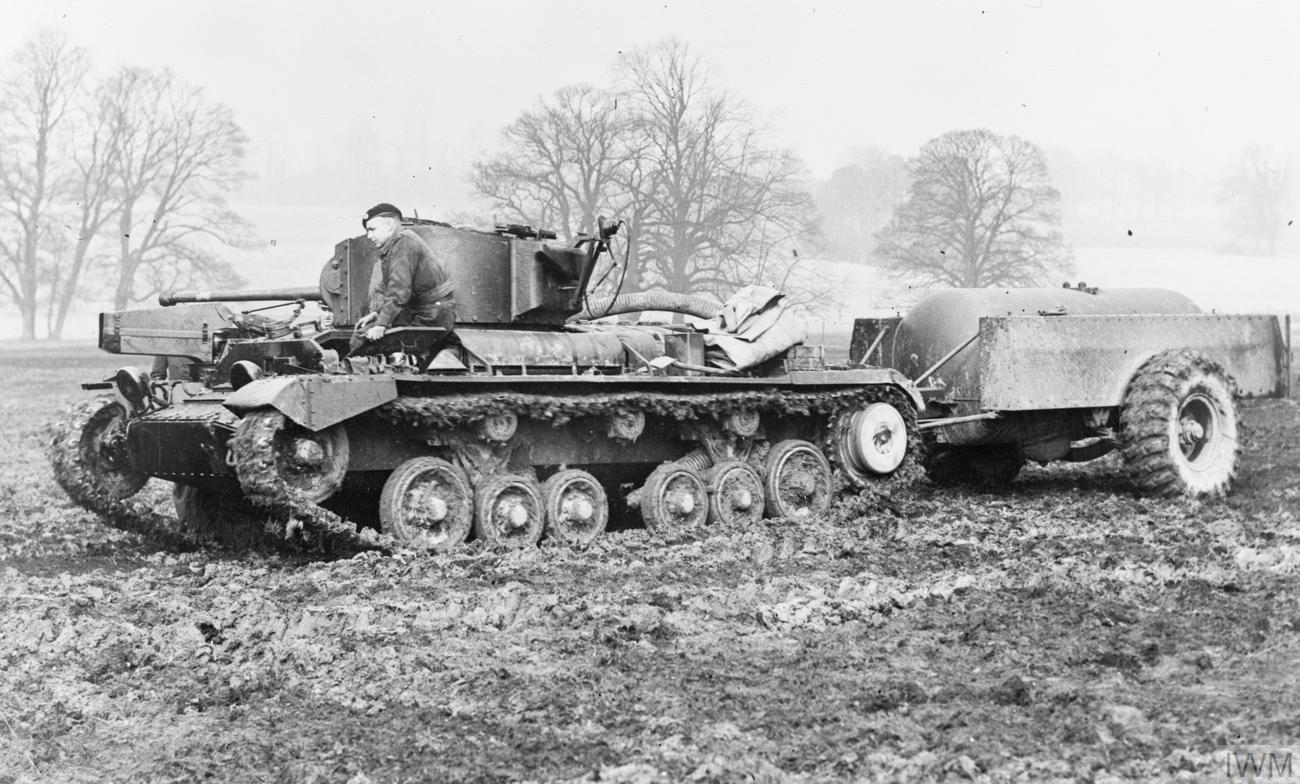
Valentine flamethrower (gas-operated equipment)

Work began on two prototypes based on the Valentine tank, both had fuel stored in a trailer but each employed a different system for generating the gas pressure required for the flame projector. One system produced by the Ministry of Supply (MoS) used gas from slow burning cordite charges that produced a pressure of 260 psi (1,800 kPa) and achieved a range of 80 yards (73 m). This system had a projector mounted in a small sub-turret that allowed the projector to be aimed. The other prototype, produced by PWD used compressed hydrogen to supply 300 psi (2,100 kPa) of pressure giving a range of 85 yards (78 m). This version seems to have been relatively crude, requiring the entire vehicle to be moved to aim the projector. Even so, the PWD system won out in a competitive trial. Its main advantage was that gas pressure was maintained allowing, if required, continuous discharge; whereas, the MoS prototype had to wait between bursts while the cordite built up more gas pressure. The two development teams merged under PWD.

=== Churchill Crocodile ===
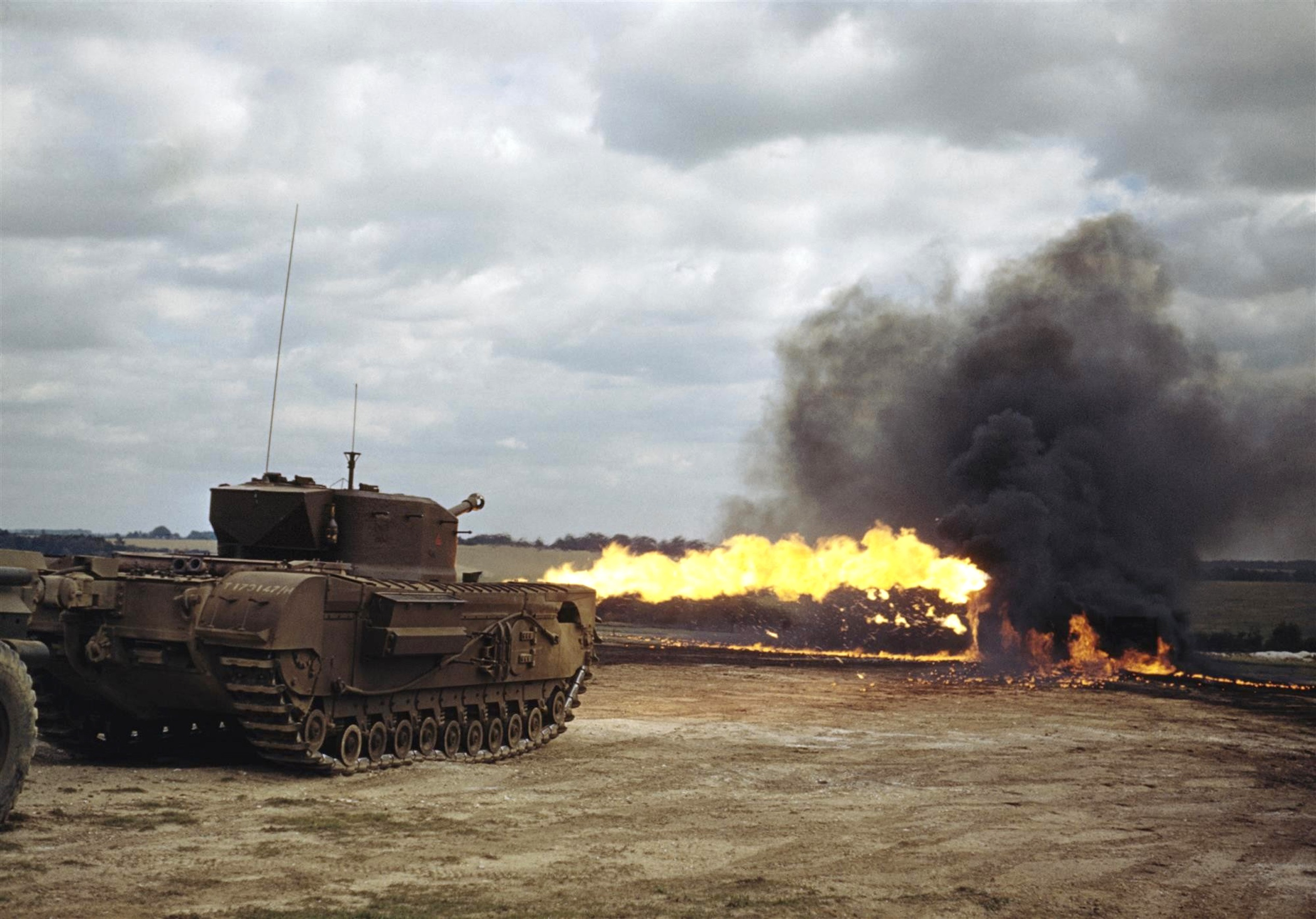
Crocodile firing flamethrower

The PWD worked on a flamethrower for the Churchill infantry tank. Work was initially slow because priority was given to the Wasp and there is a suggestion that early work on the Crocodile was unofficial. The first prototype was completed early in 1942 and a report by the Royal Armoured Corps stated that the Crocodile was not a requirement of the General Staff but that PWD was hoping that a demonstration in the near future would change minds. The design drew upon experience with the Valentine tank prototypes. Fuel and pressure for the flamethower was carried in a trailer with 0.47 in (12 mm) of armour and as a result weighing about 6.4 long tons (6.5 t). The trailer held two fuel tanks with a capacity of 400 imp gal (1,800 L) and five compressed-air cylinders plus some ancillary piping and a hand pump for filling. The trailer had two wheels fitted with run-flat tyres but no shock absorbers or brakes.

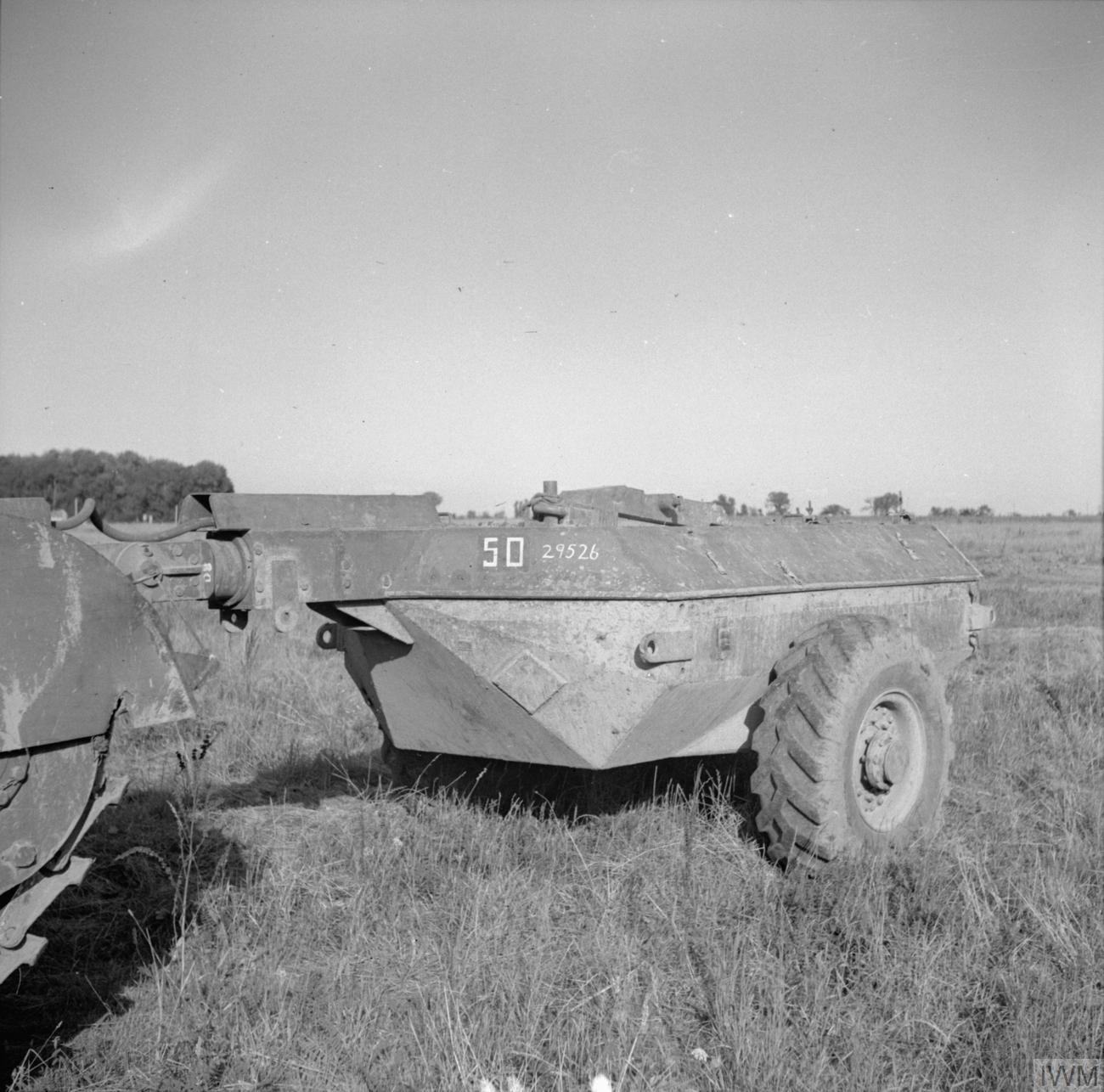
The fuel-carrying trailer

The connection between the trailer and the tank was a substantial piece of engineering, three large joints allowed the tank to move in a wide range of angles relative to the trailer. A micro-switch would activate a warning light in the driver's compartment if the angle of the connection became too large. Flamethrower fuel passed through an armoured hose to a projector mounted instead of the hull machine gun, meaning that the gunner could use the same sight for either weapon. A key requirement was that the normal operation of the tank was not restricted. In the event the original tank design required only very minor changes and it retained its original main armament. The tank's manoeuvrability was inevitably hampered by having a trailer, though this could be detached by a quick-release mechanism triggered by a Bowden cable.

The Crocodile flamethrower had a range of up to 120 yd (110 m). (Note: Fowler gives a range of 87–131 yards (80–120 m), Fortin gives a range of 77–120 yards (70–110 m) and some sources quote 150 yd (140 m).) The pressure required had to be primed on the trailer by the crew as close to use as feasible, because pressure could not be maintained for very long. The fuel was used at 4 gallons per second; refuelling took at least 90 minutes and pressurisation around 15 minutes. The fuel burned on water and could be used to set fire to woods and houses. The flamethrower could project a 'wet' burst of unlit fuel which would splash into trenches and though gaps in buildings, bunkers and other strong points, to be ignited with a second 'hot' burst.

In 1943, Percy Hobart saw a Crocodile at Orford; Hobart was in command of the 79th Armoured Division and he was responsible for many of the specialised armoured vehicles ("Hobart's Funnies"), that were to be used in the invasion of Normandy. Hobart buttonholed Sir Graham Cunningham at the Ministry of Supply and agreed a development plan. Alan Brooke (Chief of the Imperial General Staff) added the Crocodile to Hobart's brief. One of Hobart's assistants, Brigadier Yeo put pressure on for the final production and sixty Crocodiles were ready just in time for D–Day.

I was very much concerned at that time with the question of the flame throwers—Churchill had backed the chap who put the flame thrower into the Churchill tank. If you put his name on it he got mesmerized and so there was a proposal to build the "Crocodile," the flame thrower based on the tank that bore his name. I had taken the opposite view and that was that if flame was to be of any use—a weapon of special but limited usefulness—the thing that was most important was mobility and the Canadian carrier seemed to be the most promising vehicle.—General McNaughton. (Note: McNaughton quoted by Swettenham.)

== Pipeline Under the Ocean ==
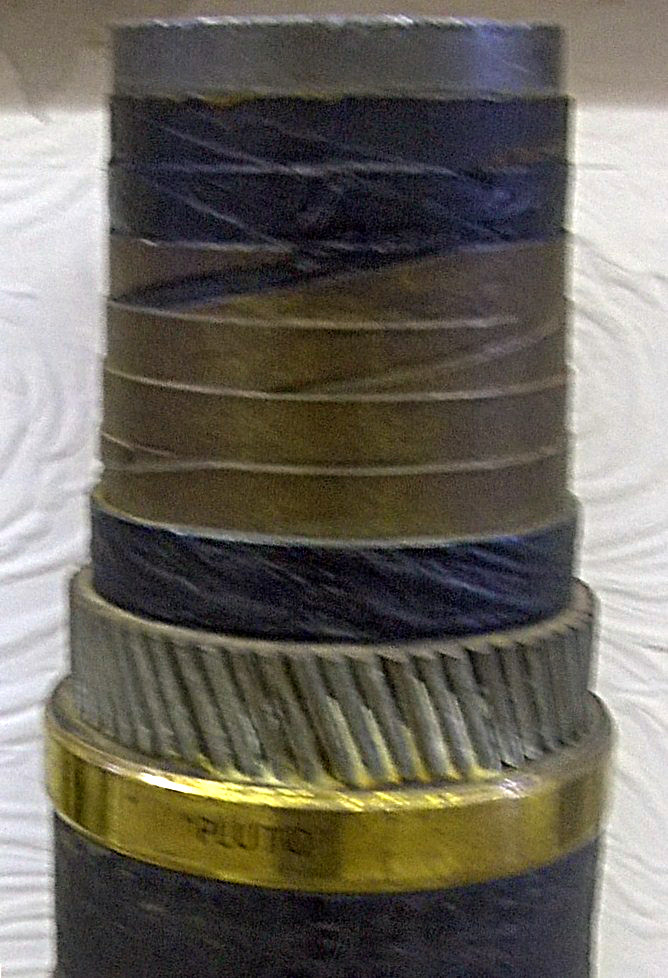
A section of HAIS pipe, with the layers successively stripped back. The pipeline consisted of a lead pipe over wound with two layers of paper, cotton, four layers of steel tape, jute yarn, galvanised steel wires and finally two layers of jute yarn. All the paper and jute layers were impregnated with bitumen. Because the bitumen was sticky, a final coat of chalk powder or whitewash was applied to ease handling.

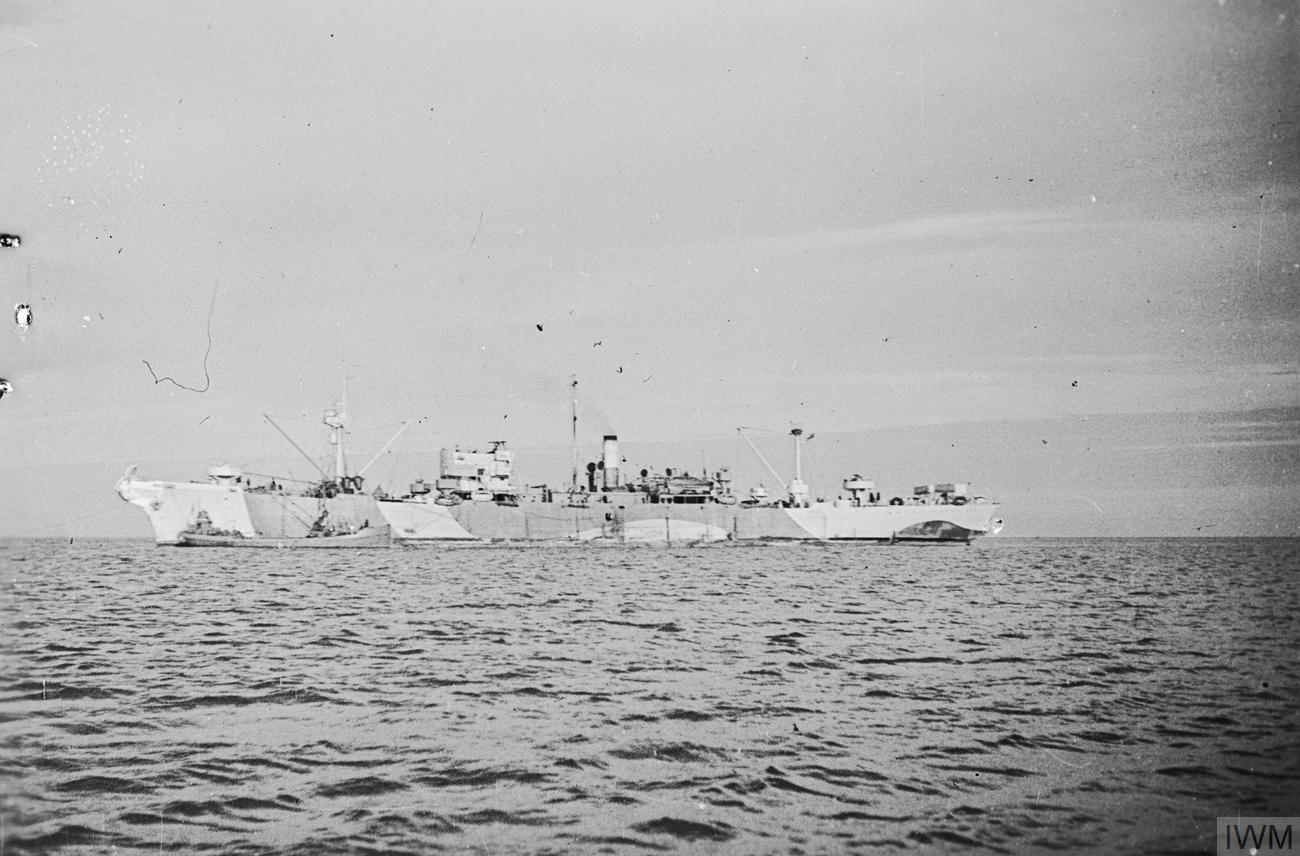
HMS Latimer

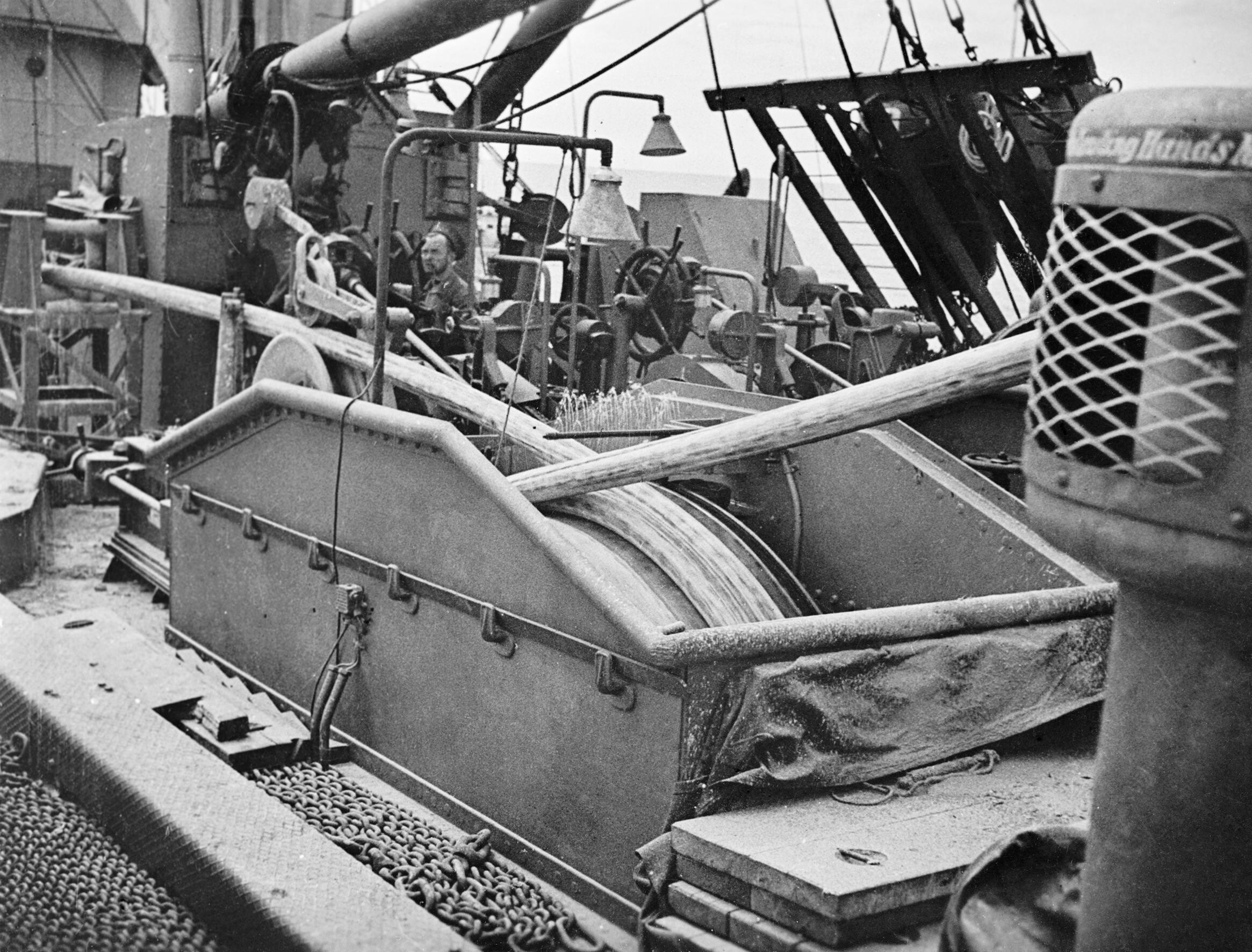
Equipment for laying the underwater pipeline on board HMS Latimer, a freighter specially adapted to lay cross channel pipelines.

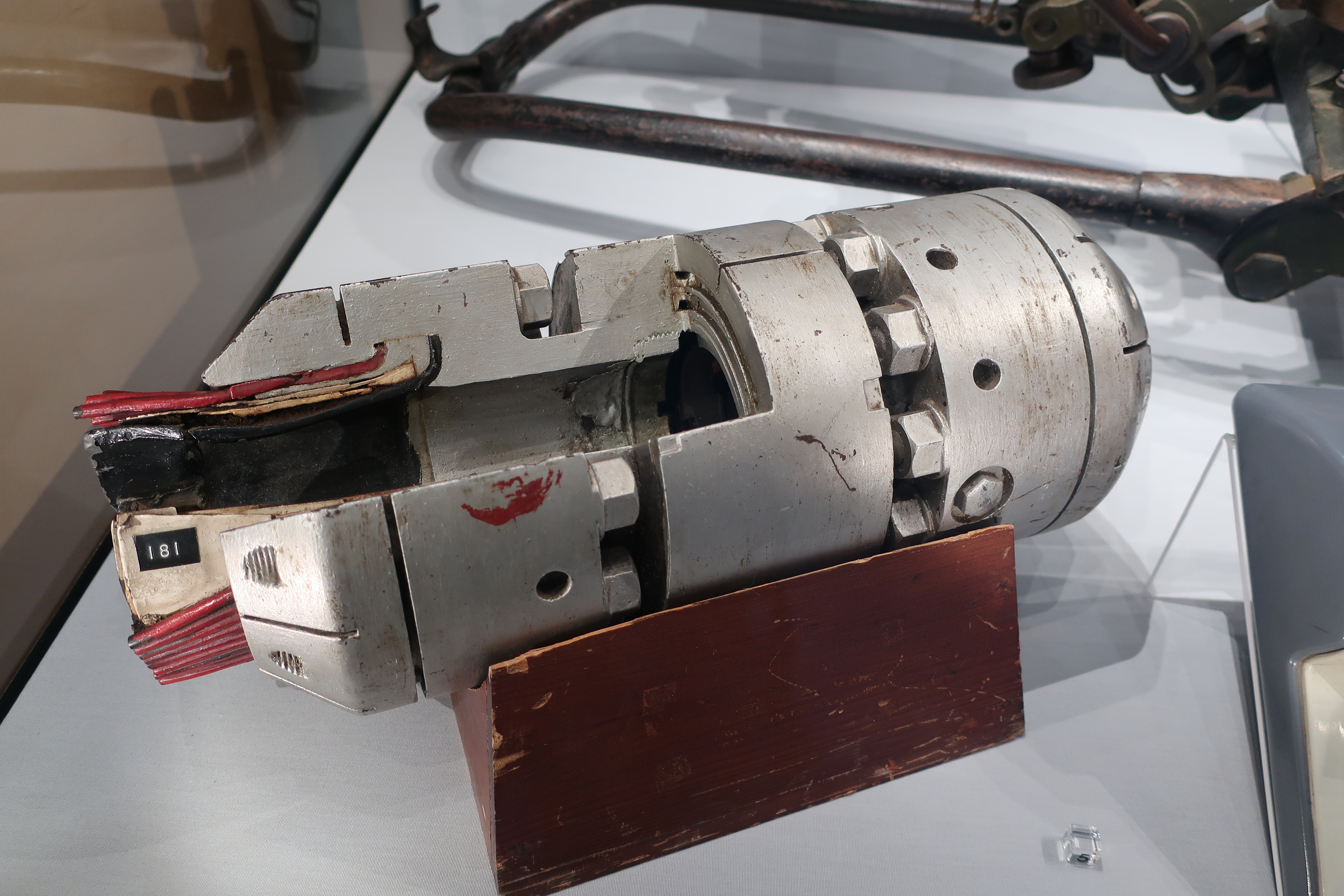
HAIS pipeline coupling.

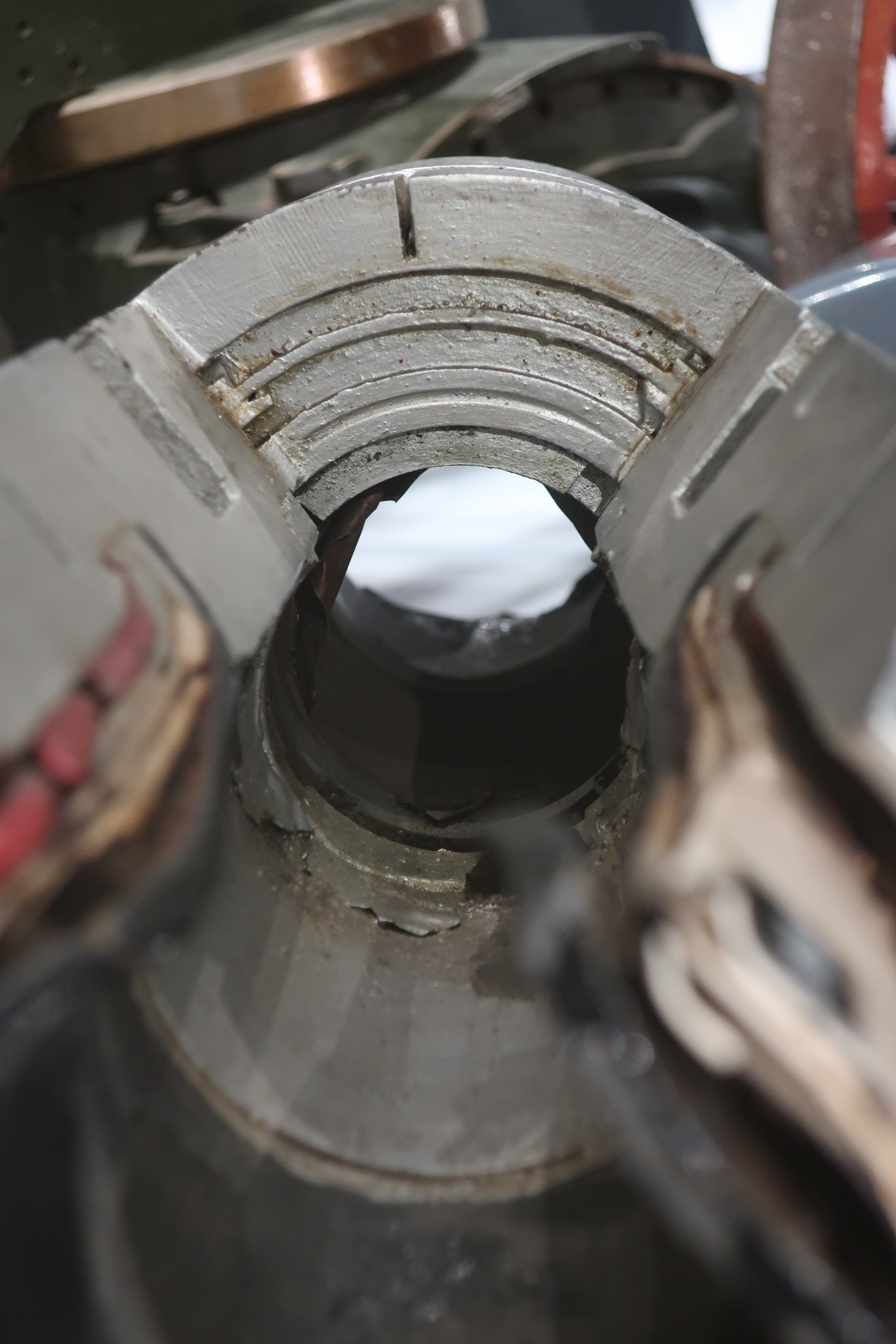
HAIS pipeline coupling interior. A burst copper disc can be seen inside.

Operation Pluto (Pipe-Lines Under The Ocean) was an operation to construct oil pipelines under the English Channel between England and France in support of Operation Overlord – the allied invasion of France.

In April 1942, plans were being drawn up for an allied invasion of France. The proposed landing force would include thousands of vehicles needing a tremendous amount of fuel which would have to be supplied somehow and maintaining a sufficient supply was potentially a serious problem. Geoffrey William Lloyd, the Minister for Petroleum, asked Lord Louis Mountbatten, Chief of Combined Operations, whose area this was, whether there was anything PWD could do to help. Mountbatten replied "Yes, you can lay an oil pipeline across the English Channel". (Note: Mountbatten quoted by Knight et al., a variation of this quote is given by Andrew Searle.) Pipelines were considered necessary to relieve dependence on oil tankers which could be slowed by bad weather, were susceptible to German submarines, and were needed in the Pacific War.

However, laying a pipeline as a part of an invasion presented significant difficulties. The pipe would have to withstand huge pressures from 600 feet (180 m) of sea water and even higher internal pressures as oil was pumped; yet the pipe would have to be flexible enough to lie on the seabed and strong enough to resist the effects of being moved by currents possibly while resting on rocks. The pipe and everything else needed would have to be prepared in great secrecy; pipe laying could not start until the invasion actually took place and would have to be completed quickly enough to be useful. Another reason to work quickly was to avoid bad weather and the worst of the channel's currents.

=== HAIS ===
On 15 April 1942, Arthur Hartley, chief engineer with the Anglo-Iranian Oil Company, attended a meeting of the Overseas Development Committee of the Oil Control Board in place of Sir William Fraser who was unable to attend. Here Hartley saw a chart of the English Channel which piqued his curiosity. Inquiring, Hartley learned about PLUTO and its many difficulties.

Hartley proposed a scheme using adapted underwater power cable developed by Siemens Brothers, (in conjunction with the National Physical Laboratory) was adopted and it became known as the HAIS pipeline. (Note: From Hartley, Anglo Iranian, and Siemens.) HAIS pipeline consisted of an inner lead tube surrounded by layers of bitumen impregnated paper, cotton and jute yarn and protected by layers of steel tape and galvanised steel wires. The design of HAIS was refined as a result of a series of tests, the main changes being to increase the layers of steel tape armouring from two to four and to manufacture the inner lead pipe using extrusion thereby avoiding a longitudinal seam. In March 1943, in a full-scale feasibility test, HMS Holdfast laid a pipeline between Swansea and Ilfracombe, a distance of about 30 miles (48 km); the pipe supplied North Devon and Cornwall with petrol for over a year. The feasibility test used a pipe with an internal diameter of 2 inches (51 mm), the same as the original power cable had had, the specification was increased to 3 inches (76 mm) to allow three times as much petrol to be pumped through.

In May 1943, Callenders, a company based in Erith, was engaged to produce HAIS pipeline sections. The lead pipe was produced in 700-yard (640 m) long sections which were then tested for twenty four hours under pressure, the pressure was then reduced to support the pipe as the armouring layers were applied. Production required new machinery and the construction of gantries to transfer the pipe from factory to storage and to load it onto ships.

The HAIS sections had to be joined; the jointing process was a form of welding known as lead burning; the projected 30-mile (48 km) length of pipeline required 75 joints and it was vital that the joints did not fail during the handling and laying or during normal operation. Brothers Frank and Albert Stone were engaged to make the critical joins.

HAIS sections were joined by first trimming the section ends and then positioning them on wooden jigs. The main sealing lead-burn was blended with the metal of the pipe with the brothers using their skills to ensure that there was a complete seal and a smooth exterior surface to ensure that nothing interfered with the armouring process. a slight ridge on the inside of the pipe was inevitable and would not significantly interfere with fuel flow. Each join took about two and half hours to complete after which the pipe would be re-pressurised and armouring would resume.

The Stone brothers worked 18- to 20-hour shifts to keep the armouring machines running. To ensure secrecy, they were instructed not to tell anybody what work they were doing and to remove the Stone company name and Ship and Chemical Plumbers signs from their two-ton Ford truck. The need for secrecy got the brothers into difficulty one night when, returning home, they ran over and killed a dog. They dutifully reported the accident at a nearby police station where a police man became suspicious of their activities because their name was not on their van and because they were very evasive when questioned. Having lost hours of valuable sleeping time while they were detained, they were released when it was noticed that their petrol ration book had been issued by the PWD.

As the pipeline came out of the machine it was taken out of the factory and hauled up to the top of a gantry from where it was laid down as a continuous 30-mile (48 km) length in huge coil about 60 feet (18 m) in diameter and 10 feet (3.0 m) high. About 250 miles (400 km) of HAIS pipe were produced in the UK and another 140 miles (230 km) were produced by American companies.

Four ships were converted from their role as merchants to carry and lay HAIS pipeline. These were HMS Latimer and HMS Sancroft at 7,000 tons; and HMS Holdfast and HMS Algerian at 1,500 tons. The larger two of the flotilla could each carry two lengths of HAIS pipeline; sufficient for the 70 miles (110 km) distance to Normandy. The smaller ships could only carry a single length of pipeline and were used to lay the pipes from Kent to the Pas de Calais. A number of Thames barges were equipped to lay pipes in shallow water from the ships to the shore terminals. These same barges also laid short lengths of the relatively flexible HAIS pipe at the landfall ends of the steel HAMEL pipes.

Coupling devices were designed so that lengths of pipe could be joined while at sea, an operation that could be completed in about 20 minutes. The couplings incorporated thin copper disks that would maintain the pressure of water kept in the pipes in order to prevent distortion during handling and laying; the disks were designed to burst when the fuel pumps brought pipes up to the operating pressure.

=== HAMEL ===
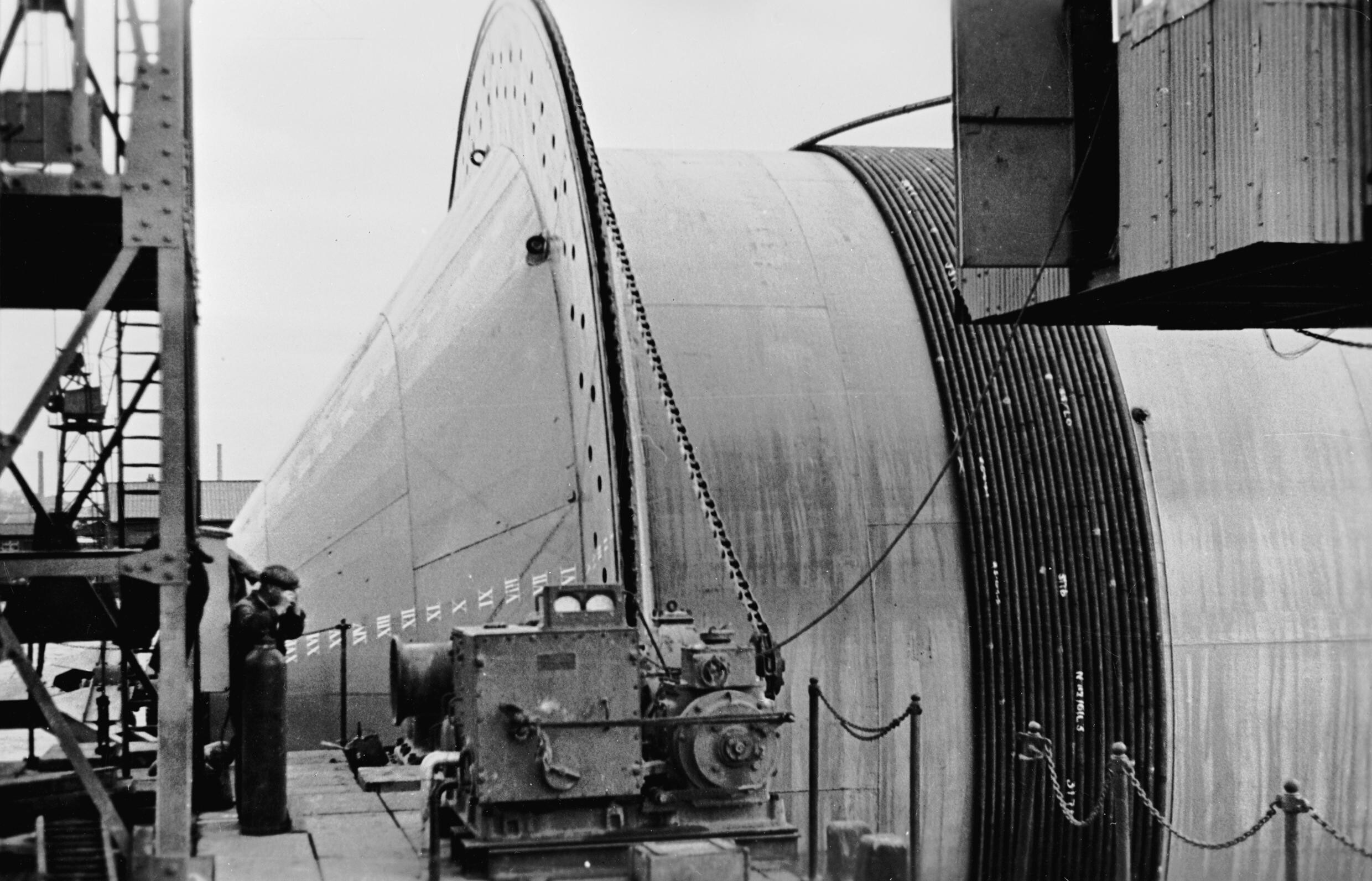
HAMEL pipe being wound onto a 'Conundrum' pipe-laying device, June 1944.

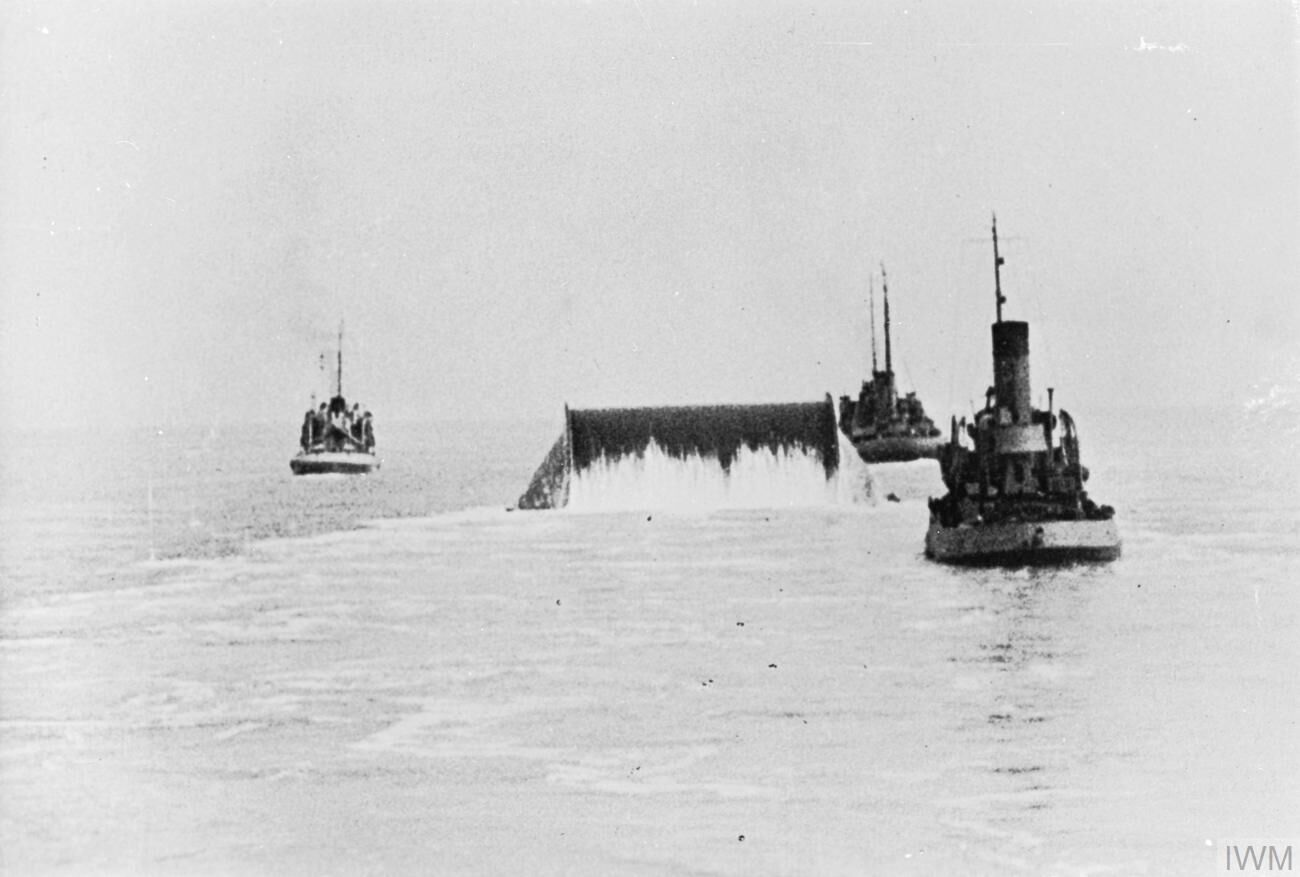
Conundrum at sea.

An all-steel pipe was also developed; this became known as HAMEL after Henry Alexander Hammick and B.J. Ellis of the Iraq Petroleum Company and Burmah Oil Company respectively. This design was an alternative in case HAIS failed or not enough lead could be obtained for its continued production. HAMEL was a steel tube 3 inches (76 mm) in diameter and was similar to onshore pipelines. Hammick and Ellis had noticed the flexibility of long lengths of steel pipe used for onshore pipelines and thought that sections of pipe could be welded together to make a pipe of any desired length. Special welding machines were obtained to make the thousands of strong and reliable joints needed to cross the channel.

Although the steel pipe was flexible, it could not easily be twisted. This meant that it could not be stored as a coil in the hold of a cable laying ship where each turn of the coil would require a 360° twist in the pipe as it was laid. Admiralty Hopper Barge No 24 was fitted out with a large wheel allowing pipe to be wound and unwound without twisting. Renamed HMS Persephone, this ship laid pipes from the British mainland to the Isle of Wight, this served as a trial run and pipes laid provided a vital link in the oil pipeline network.

Persephone, however, could only lay a relatively short length of pipe. Ellis solved this problem with the design of a 30-foot-diameter (9.1 m) floating drum onto which a great length of pipe could be coiled in the manner of thread on a bobbin. This drum could be towed across the channel and the pipe unwound onto the seabed. The mysterious-looking, conical-ended drum was aptly dubbed HMS Conundrum. The proportions of the conundrums were impressive: the winding cylinder was 40 feet (12 m) in diameter and 60 feet (18 m) wide; including the conical ends, the overall width was 90 feet (27 m). Short lengths of pipe were welded together into 4,000 feet (1,200 m) sections, as these long sections were welded together the finished pipe was wound onto the floating conundrum. The conundrum's height in the water could be adjusted by varying the amount of ballast water in the drum. One conundrum could carry up to 80 miles (130 km) of pipeline and six conundrums, numbered I to VI, were built.

Tests using a powerful tug to tow a conundrum were disappointing even when a second tug was added. Banks, a man with no seamanship skills, suggested that the wake of the tugs engines was pushing the conundrum backwards and impeding movement; separating the two tugs greatly improved performance, and a third small tug was added behind the conundrum to help with steering.

An onshore pipeline system had been established during the war that fed petroleum from tankers berthed at London, Bristol and Merseyside to airfields in Southern England. PLUTO was fed via a spur established to Lepe, a hamlet on the shore of The Solent. From there, a length of HAMEL pipe took fuel under the Solent to a bay near Cowes on the Isle of Wight, through an overland pipe across the island to Shanklin.

=== Pluto Minor ===
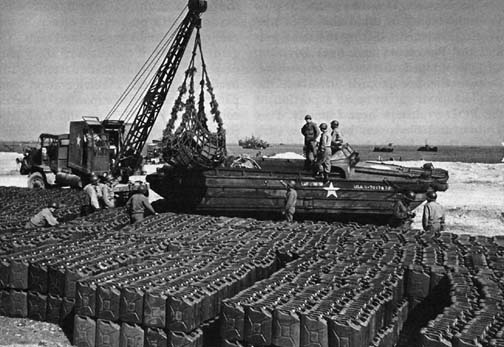
Truck mounted crane and DUKW at POL dump on the beach during April 1944 training exercises at Slapton Sands, Devon, England, in preparation for the D‑Day invasion that followed in June.

The invasion of Normandy began on 6 June 1944. Troops, equipment and vehicles were landed on the beaches and they were soon followed by thousands of jerrycans of fuel. 13,400 tons of fuel were landed this way on D‑day itself.

Operation Pluto was scheduled to lay its first pipeline across the channel just 18 days after D‑Day, but this did not happen. Troops continued to be supported by transporting jerrycans of fuel. As daily fuel consumption rose, ship-to-shore pipelines codenamed TOMBOLA were laid.

=== Pipe to Cherbourg ===
The British planned to establish an undersea pipeline from the Isle of Wight to the French port of Cherbourg as soon as it had been liberated by Allied forces. Pumping stations were established at Shanklin and at Sandown and collectively known by the codename BAMBI. Shanklin was, as it is today, a popular seaside resort at Sandown Bay on the Isle of Wight. Many of its Victorian houses and hotels had been bombed by the Luftwaffe, providing excellent cover for PLUTO's pump houses. At Sandown, the pumps were installed in the old fortifications of the Yaverland Battery. At each location, great care was taken to hide what was going on from the enemy; lorry loads of building materials were hidden as soon as they arrived on site. At Shanklin a 620,000-imperial-gallon (740,000 US gal; 2,800,000 L) tank was built on a hill and hidden by trees and camouflage netting. Near the shore the pumps were installed in the remains of the Royal Spa Hotel "simulating on a new elevation – twelve feet higher up the debris and wrecked dwelling-rooms – even the contents of the bathrooms, that strewed the ground, and hiding our mechanisms beneath this false floor." From the hotel pump room, pipes ran to the town's pier, along it and down into the sea. At Sandown the activity was hidden by newly seeded grass that had to be watered every day and by carefully brushing out lorry tyre tracks. With everything prepared, there was nothing to do but to wait for D‑day.

It had been planned that the first full-length Pluto pipe would be laid on D+18 (that is 18 days after D-day). The plans were delayed because it took longer than expected to capture Cherbourg and when the port was finally taken it was heavily damaged and extensively mined. The first cross channel pipe, a HAIS, was laid on 12 August by HMS Latimer. All went well until, in the final stages, she caught the pipe with her own anchor and wrecked it. Two days later Sancroft laid a pipe: again all went well until the final stage of bringing the pipe ashore when a mishap caused the pipe to be abandoned. The first attempt to lay a HAMEL pipeline was made on 27 August (D+82) but had to be abandoned because tons of barnacles had accumulated on one side of the Conundrum. Problems continued with the final stage of connecting HAIS and HAMEL pipes to the shore; the resulting leaks and other difficulties causing the pipes to be abandoned. On 18 September (D+104) a HAIS pipe was finally connected and successfully tested; four days later fuel pumping started delivering 56,000 imperial gallons (67,000 US gal; 250,000 L) every day. On 29 September (D+115) a HAMEL pipeline was also successfully connected.

Although sources vary, it seems likely that only one HAIS and one HAMEL pipeline were successfully laid. While their contribution to the war effort was no-doubt welcome, with so many delays Operation Pluto had failed to deliver when it was most needed and with so few successful pipes being connected what it did deliver was a relative trickle compared with the bulk of supplies that were being landed at captured ports. Even partial success did not last long: on 3 October it was decided to increase the pressure of the HAIS pipeline, causing it to fail after a few hours and that same night the HAMEL pipeline also failed. By this time, the allies' circumstances had changed dramatically, the deep water port of Le Havre had been captured and the armies had penetrated deep into France; rather than attempt a repair or replacement of the existing pipelines, attention shifted to the much shorter route across the channel to Calais. Contrary to the upbeat tone of Bank's memoir, this stage of Operation Pluto was little short of failure.

=== Pipe to Pas de Calais ===
"When the lay was reported complete the pumps were coupled up and more water pumped in from the home end. Anxious faces would gather round the pressure meter in the control room to watch the needle climb steadily to the bursting pressure of the first disc and a sigh of relief would go up when it suddenly wobbled and fell back again. The first disc had blown satisfactorily. Successively one disc after another would be negotiated, the excitement growing as the last ones were reached. Eventually, some 1 3/4 hours after the commencement of pumping, the final one would go and a welcome telephone call from the other side would announce 'Line on flow'." – Donald Banks.

A pumping station named DUMBO was established at Dungeness in Kent. This pumping station received oil from west coast ports and from the Isle of Grain oil terminal. The route of the pipeline was chosen to give the enemy the impression that the oil was being sent to the area between Hythe and Folkestone, consistent with an allied invasion at the Pas-de-Calais. Pumps were installed into some of the many seaside homes at Dungeness and the pipes were covered in the shingle of which the headland is largely composed.

The first connection attempted was a HAIS pipe which was laid on 10 October. Vital lessons had been learned from earlier experience and the difficulties in making the shore connections were overcome. However, worsening weather and waning official enthusiasm dampened progress. Fuel pumping was delayed until 27 October and by December only four HAIS pipe were working and these had to run at a relatively low pressure resulting in daily delivery of just 700 tons of fuel. Despite official doubts, PLUTO continued. HAMEL pipe was more difficult to bring ashore and especially so in poor weather; the problem was solved by adding lengths of HAIS pipe onto the ends of a HAMEL pipeline as it was wound onto a conundrum greatly simplifying shore connection.

Seventeen pipelines were laid from Dungeness to Boulogne of which up to 11 were working until the end of the war. This route had a capacity of 1,350,000 imperial gallons (1,620,000 US gal; 6,100,000 L) per day and regularly delivered more than 1,000,000 imperial gallons (1,200,000 US gal; 4,500,000 L) daily Although this delivery rate was impressive, it actually represented little more than 10% of fuel transported across the Channel and this was achieved too late to have any impact on the campaign. The pipelines were not designed to last long, the steel HAMEL pipes generally succumbed to friction with the sea bed within a few weeks and the HAIS pipes lasted only a little longer.

Operation Pluto faced several difficulties, such as the delay in the retaking of Cherbourg and an inability to translate the results of trials into reality quickly enough to keep up with the fighting. However, it showed an impressive level of technical achievement despite the overall situation.

"In retrospect, it seems clear that PLUTO's advocates had been far too sanguine. They had assumed that it would be possible for the naval laying units to achieve immediately the degree of technical proficiency attained by the technically expert laying parties in the trials conducted in 1943 under the supervision of those who had designed the equipment; and that what could be done in the Bristol Channel and the Solent could be done in wartime operational conditions on the much longer lay across the Channel" (Note: DJ Payton-Smith quoted by Searle.)

=== Recovery ===
PLUTO ceased operation in July 1945, just a few months after the end of fighting in Europe. Because the pipes were a hazard to shipping, the Royal Navy cut the pipe and removed sections that were just a few miles offshore. Starting in August 1946, the former HMS Latimer was used in a private salvage operation. The first part of the operation used a grapple to find a pipeline and haul it up and onto the ship's bow.

HAIS was found to be in good condition and its high lead content made salvage particularly valuable; each pipe could be cut just once and then coiled in the ship's hold. Lengths of HAIS pipes were cleared of petrol and cut into lengths suitable for transportation by rail. These short lengths were sent to Swansea where the recovered lead was melted and cast into ingots; the wires were straightened and used as rebars; the steel tapes were flatted and used to make corner reinforcements for heavy duty cardboard boxes; and the jute was made into blocks that could be burned as fuel in a furnace.

The HAMEL pipes were also valuable, but being less flexible, needed to be cut into lengths on the deck of the recovery ship. Cutting either type of pipeline was very dangerous because the pipes still contained petrol. The contaminated petrol from both types of pipe was recovered and cleaned up, yielding some 66,000 imperial gallons (79,000 US gal; 300,000 L) of useful fuel.

The salvage operation lasted three years. Of the 25,000 tons of lead and steel originally used, 22,000 tons were recovered.

== Fog Investigation and Dispersal Operation ==
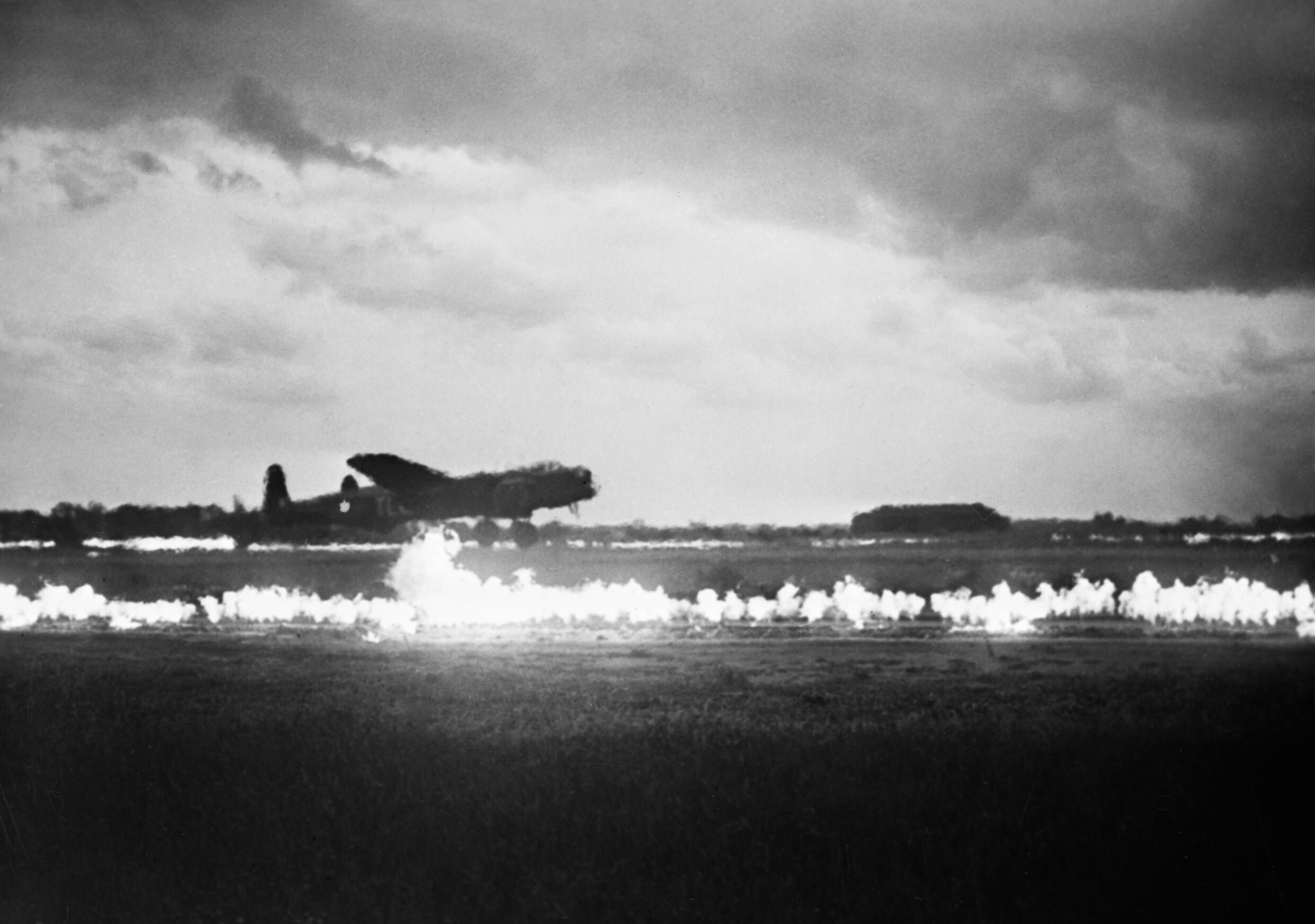
FIDO at Graveley, Huntingdonshire, as an Avro Lancaster of No. 35 Squadron RAF takes off in deteriorating weather, 28 May 1945.

From the beginning of the war it became evident that many aircraft were being lost in accidents during landing in unfavourable weather. Fog was a particularly serious hazard, settling unpredictably over airfields where tired, possibly injured, pilots in aeroplanes short of fuel and in some cases damaged, had to land. The night of 16/17 October 1940 was particularly unfortunate. In raids by 73 bombers three aircraft were shot down but ten crashed on landing. When this was brought to the attention of Prime Minister Churchill he demanded that something be done: "... It ought to be possible to guide them down quite safely as commercial craft were before the war in spite of fog. Let me have full particulars. The accidents last night are very serious" (Note: Churchill quoted by Williams.)

Previously Professor David Brunt of Imperial College London had calculated that if the temperature of a volume of fog were raised by about 5 °F (3 °C) it would evaporate. Some preliminary experiments had been conducted between 1936 and 1939 using burners based on agricultural sprayers and a fuel that was a mixture of petrol and alcohol. Although the heat generated was not sufficient to clear a substantial volume of fog, the feasibility of the method was established. However, no further development took place.

As the bomber offensive grew in scale, more aircraft flew ever greater distances and more accidents followed. Despite Churchill's injunction, no measures being taken to reduce the losses caused by bad weather. Eventually, in September 1941 Charles Portal, Chief of the Air Staff and Lord Cherwell, Churchill's scientific advisor, recommended that the pre-war fog dispersal work should be resumed. However, the idea met with resistance and Cherwell later reluctantly recommended postponement.

"I am persuaded that the procedure which offers the best chance of rapid progress in fog clearance is to entrust the experimental work to the Petroleum Warfare Dept. Mr Geoffrey Lloyd, the Minister for Petroleum, is prepared to undertake it. The department has experience in dealing with analogous problems and they have a certain amount of plant and equipment which would enable them to get to work at once. Lord Cherwell agrees that this is the best line of action – indeed, the suggestion came from him. It would help Mr Lloyd if you would send him a Minute authorizing him to proceed!" — Secretary of State for Air, Archibald Sinclair, September 1942. (Note: Archibald Sinclair quoted by Williams.)

By September 1942 it was realised that not only were many aircraft being unnecessarily lost but that sustained operations were being limited by considerations of the weather. Secretary of State for Air, Archibald Sinclair recommended that PWD undertake fog dispersal trials. Within 24 hours, a personal minute was on Geoffrey Lloyd's desk: "It is of the greatest importance to find a means to dissipate fog at aerodromes so that aircraft can land safely. Let full experiments to this end be put in hand by the Petroleum Warfare Department with all expedition. They should be given every possible support. W.S.C." (Note: Churchill quoted by Williams.)

Lloyd, Banks, Hartley (chief engineer of the Anglo-Iranian Oil Company), and Edward George Walker a civil and aeronautical engineer, and others, met. Lloyd visited fruit farmers who used Smudge pot heaters to protect their crops; Hartley arranged for a part of the King George VI Reservoir that had been left empty for the duration of the war to be used for experiments; and Walker took to long walks on foggy nights wearing a government issue donkey jacket – much to the puzzlement of his family. Experiments were quickly put in hand with large scale tests taking place in the reservoir and smaller scale tests in a disused indoor ice rink at Earls Court where a wind tunnel was set up so that a wide range of weather conditions could be simulated.

In some of the earliest experiments, Wasp flame throwers were used. A Cockatrice in thick fog fired six 1 1/2 second busts which cleared the air in its immediate vicinity.

The first purpose designed burner was known as Four-Oaks used a mixture of petrol and alcohol, but it was not possible to obtain a smokeless flame. On 4 November 1942 a test was performed with two rows of Four-Oaks burners 200 yards (180 m) long and 100 yards (91 m) apart. A fireman went up an escape ladder borrowed for the experiments and he disappeared into the gloom after climbing just a few rungs. As the burners got going he reappeared at the top of the 80-foot (24 m) ladder only to disappear again when the burners were turned off. Unfortunately, the Four-Oaks burner produced as much smoke as it cleared fog and did not produce a really satisfactory degree of heating. Experiments with coke burners worked better, at least initially, but they could not be controlled and caused smoke and other problems.

A new burner called Haigas (later known as the Mark I) was developed. Haigas used petrol which was preheated to form a vapour before it was burnt, thereby significantly increasing efficiency and reducing smoke. An experimental system was installed at Graveley, Cambridgeshire and was tested for the first time on 18 February 1943 in poor visibility, although not thick fog. The pilot, Air commodore Don Bennett, commander of the RAF Pathfinder Force, said "I had vague thoughts of seeing lions jumping through a hoop of flames at the circus. The glare was certainly considerable and there was some runway turbulence, but it was nothing to worry about." (Note: Air commodore Bennett quoted by Williams.) Graveley became the first operational FIDO site and the system was rapidly expanded.

The Haigas (or Mark I) burner was 50 ft (15 m) long and comprised four connected lengths of pipe held just above ground level. The pipes ran back and forth in close proximity along the burner's length. After traversing the length of the burner three times, the petrol flowed into the fourth length of pipe: a burner pipe that was pierced with holes. The circuitous route of the fuel allowed it to be heated and vaporised by the heat of burners, this was done so that it would burn efficiently and without producing significant amounts of smoke.

Later burner designs called the Haigill system and designated Mark II to Mark VI were simpler and more efficient, requiring only three lengths of pipe. Earlier versions of Haigill used two runs of evaporator pipe and one burner pipe, later versions used one run of evaporator pipe and two burner pipes.

Later still, the Hairpin burner was developed, it had one length of evaporator pipe immediately above one length of burner pipe. Hairpin was set in a specially shaped cast-iron trough in a heat-resistant concrete trench that was then covered in a grid of steel bars at ground level. This design did not generate any more heat than the earlier versions, but was much less intrusive upon air operations. Yet more sophisticated designs followed along similar lines.

The value of FIDO is difficult to estimate. Approximately 700 aircraft landed with FIDO operating in foggy conditions and about 2,000 landed with FIDO being used allowing the runway to be identified in conditions of limited visibility. Some 3,500 aircrew owe their lives to FIDO and for perhaps 10,000 others a serious situation made easier. The FIDO system was briefly used commercially. It was intended to be used at London Heathrow Airport and small sections were put in place. However, advances in various landing systems made FIDO redundant.

== Legacy ==
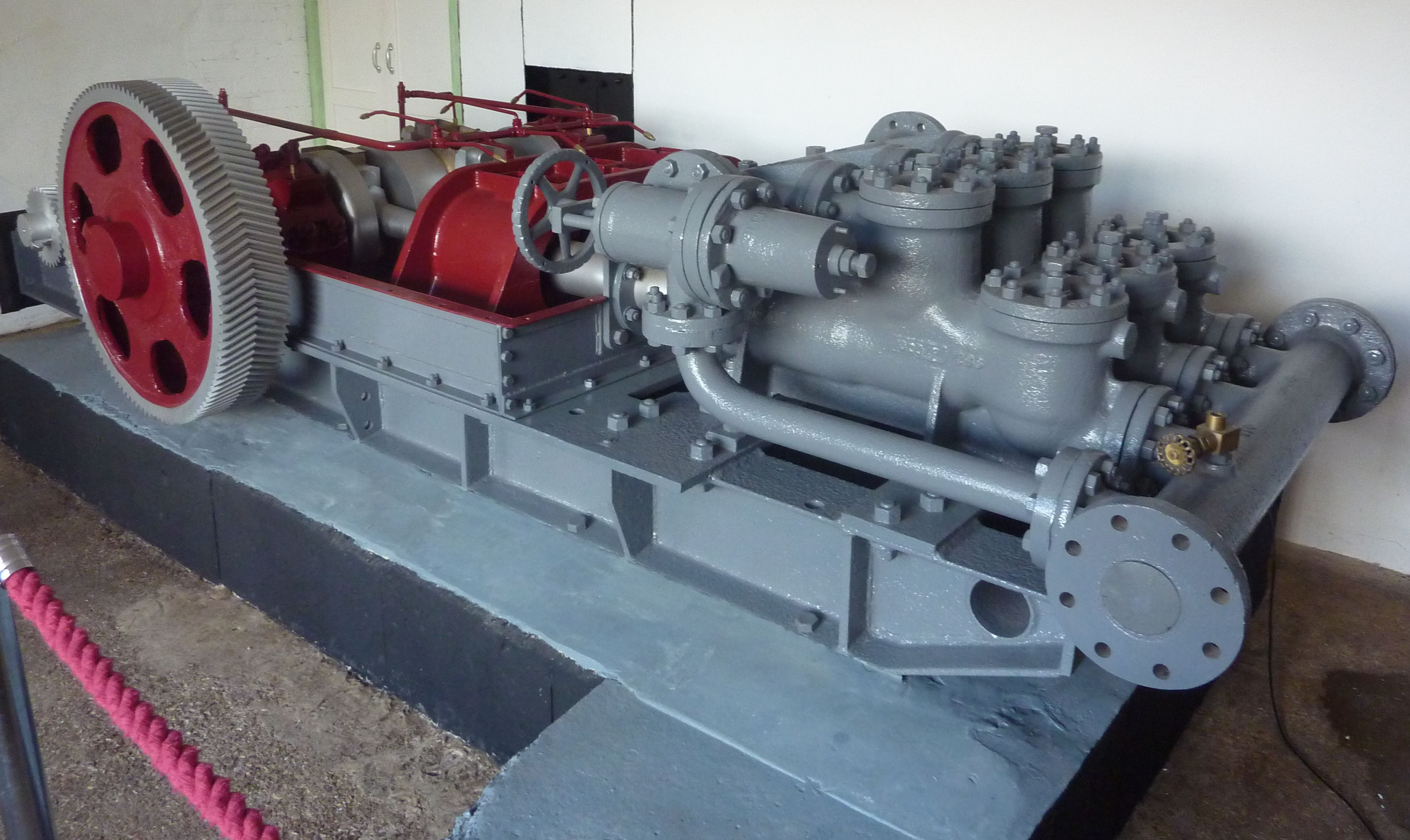
PLUTO Pump at Sandown Zoo on the Isle of Wight

When the war in Europe was nearly won, the activities of the Petroleum Warfare Department were widely publicised as being demonstrative of British ingenuity. Newsreels told the British public how flamethrower weapons had been developed to defend the country against invasion and how the PLUTO and FIDO projects had helped win the war.

The Petroleum Warfare Department planned a travelling exhibition of its achievements; the end of hostilities caused a change of plan: a temporary exhibition at the otherwise closed Imperial War Museum. From October 1945 to January 1946 the general public was invited to view details of flame throwing weapons, the FIDO system and PLUTO. The exhibition was viewed by more than 20,000 people. Donald Banks published his account of the activities of the PWD in Flame Over Britain.

Engineer-turned-author Nevil Shute joined the Royal Naval Volunteer Reserve as a sub-lieutenant and soon ended up in what would become the Directorate of Miscellaneous Weapons Development. Drawing on his experience, he wrote Most Secret, a novel about a converted fishing vessel equipped with a cockatrice-like weapon. The book was written in 1942, but its publication was held back by the censor until 1945.

There is a PLUTO pump on display at the Bembridge Heritage Centre and at the Isle of Wight Zoo at Sandown. There is a book Where PLUTO Crossed the Path that describes where the public can trace markers on the pipeline route on the Isle of Wight.

== See also ==
- British anti-invasion preparations of World War II
- British hardened field defences of World War II

== Bibliography ==
Books

- Agar, Augustus (1961). Footprints in the Sea. Cox &Wyman.
- Alanbrooke, Field Marshal Lord (2001). War Diaries 1939–1945. Phoenix Press. ISBN 1-84212-526-5.
- Baker White, John (1955). The Big Lie. Evans Brothers.
- Banks, Sir Donald (1946). Flame Over Britain. Sampson Low, Marston and Co.
- Banks, Sir Donald (2020). Across the Channel. Blue Ormer. ISBN 9781999341510.
- Bishop, Chris (2002). The Encyclopedia of Weapons of World War II. Sterling Publishing Company, Inc. ISBN 9781586637620.
- Buffetaut, Yves (1994). D-Day Ships: The Allied Invasion Fleet, June 1944. Naval Institute Press. ISBN 978-1-55750-152-3.
- Churchill, Winston (2005) [1949]. Their Finest Hour. The Second World War, Volume II. Penguin. ISBN 0-141-44173-9.
- Clarke, D.M. (2011). "Arming the British Home Guard, 1940–1944". Cranfield University. hdl:1826/6164.
- Cull, Nicholas John; Culbert, David Holbrook; Welch, David (2003). Propaganda and mass persuasion: a historical encyclopedia, 1500 to the present. ISBN 9781576078204.
- Delaforce, Patrick (1998). Churchill's Secret Weapons – The Story of Hobart's Funnies. Robert Hale. ISBN 0-7090-6237-0.
- Farthing, John. Where Pluto Crossed the Path. ISBN 978-9781873294. – walks on the Isle of Wight near PLUTO pipes.
- Fletcher, David (2007). Churchill Crocodile Flamethrower. New Vanguard. Illustrated by Peter Sarson. Osprey. ISBN 978-1846030833.
- Fortin, Ludovic (2005). British Armour in Normandy. Histoire and Collections. ISBN 978-2915239331.
- Fowler, Will (2003). D–Day the First 24 Hours. Lewis International. ISBN 978-1930983229.
- Foulkes, Charles Howard (2001) [1934, First published Blackwood & Sons]. "Gas!" The Story of the Special Brigade. Naval & Military Press. ISBN 1-84342-088-0.
- Graves, Charles (1943). The Home Guard of Britain.
- Harrison, Gordon A. (2002) [1951]. Cross Channel Attack. United States Army Center of Military History. ISBN 978-1568523798. CMH Pub 7-4. Archived from the original on 12 December 2007.
- Hayward, James (1994). Shingle Street.
- Hayward, James (2001). The Bodies on the Beach – Sealion, Shingle Street and the Burning Sea Myth of 1940. CD41 Publishing. ISBN 0-9540549-0-3.
- Ironside, Edmund (1962). Macleod and Kelly (ed.). The Ironside diaries, 1937–1940. Constable.
- Jackson, Robert (2002). Dunkirk – The British Evacuation, 1940. Phoenix Press. ISBN 978-0304359684.
- Jackson, Jack Tully; Haire, David N. (2015). "Defence Against Invasion". East Lothian at War. Archived from the original on 4 March 2016.
- Knight, Bob; Smith, Harry; Barnett, Barry (1998). Pluto – World War II's Best-Kept Secret. Bexley Council's Local Studies Centre et al.
- Longmate, Norman (1974). The real Dad's Army: the story of the Home Guard. Arrow. ISBN 0-09-909830-X.
- McKinstry, Leo (2014). Operation Sea Lion. Overlook. ISBN 9781468301496.
- Palazzo, Albert (2002). Seeking Victory on the Western Front: The British Army and Chemical Warfare in World War I. U of Nebraska Press. ISBN 978-0-8032-8774-7.
- Pawle, Gerald (1956). The Secret War 1939–45. London: Harrap.
- Perret, Bryan; Hogg, Ian (1989). Encyclopedia of the Second World War. London: Longman. ISBN 0582893283.
- Roskill, Stephen (1974). Hankey: Man Of Secrets. Vol. III (1931–1963). Collins. ISBN 0-00-211332-5.
- Searle, Adrian (1995) [2004]. PLUTO – Pipe-Line Under The Ocean. Shanklin Chine. ISBN 978-0952587606.
- Sebag-Montefiore, Hugh (2007). Dunkirk, Fight to the Last Man. Penguin. ISBN 978-0141024370.
- Shirer, William L. (1961). Berlin Diary.
- Shute, Nevil (1945). Most Secret. William Heinemann.
- Swettenham, John (1968). McNaughton. Vol. 2 (1939–1943). Ryerson Press. ISBN 978-0770002381.
- Payton-Smith, D.J. (1971). Oil: A Study of Wartime Policy and Administration.
- Thomson, G.P. (1947). Blue Pencil Admiral – Secrets of the Press Censorship by the Chief Censor. Sampson Low, Marston & co.
- Ward, Arthur (1997). Resisting the Nazi Invader. Constable and Co. ISBN 0-09-476750-5.
- Weeks, John S. (1975). Men against tanks: a history of anti-tank warfare. David & Charles. ISBN 978-0715369098.
- Williams, Geoffrey (1995). Flying Through Fire. Grange Books. ISBN 1-85627-900-6.

Hansard

- "F.I.D.O., Heathrow (Abandonment)". House of Commons Debates - Written Answers. UK Parliament. 18 December 1946. 392W.

Unattributed sources

- "Frank Stone (Obituary)". The Telegraph. 26 March 2004.
- "British Fire Traps Awaited Invaders". Popular Science. August 1945.
- "Flame Defences of Britain". The Times. 4 June 1945. p. 4 column E.
- "Petroleum Warfare Exhibition: Secrets Of Crocodile And Wasp". The Times. 5 October 1945. p. 7 column D.
- "Pipeline Under The Ocean". Combined Operations. www.combinedops.com.
- "PLUTO – The Salvage Operation – 1947 to 1949". Combined Operations. www.combinedops.com.
- "Day 374 September 8, 1940". World War II Day-by-Day. 7 September 2010.
- "British Fire Traps Awaited Invaders". Popular Science: 66. August 1945.

War Office documents

- Barrel Flame Traps, Flame Warfare. Military Training Pamphlet No. 53. Part 1. War Office. July 1942.
- Instructions for the use of the Marsden Flame Thrower. War Office. Military Training Manual No 42, Amendment No. 4, Appendix G. War Office. June 1941.

Pathé News

- Flame Throwers – Flame thrower tanks demonstrated by Canadian soldiers (Film). British Pathe. 1944.
- Defence By Fire (Film). British Pathe. 1945. – Burning seas (from start), flame barrage (from 2:10), hedge hopper (from 3:28), fougasse (from 3:59), Cockatrice (from 4:32). Note that the narrator gives an exaggerated account and repeats some propaganda as fact.
- Operation Pluto (Film). British Pathe. 1945.
- F.i.d.o. (Film). British Pathe. 1945.

Imperial War Museum documents

- "IWM 11770 – Weaponry, Inventions and Improvements by Captain H Newton during the First World War". Imperial War Museum. – a manuscript detailing Captain Newton's work, written by his nephew.
- "IWM K98/152 – Home Guard Flame Thrower". Imperial War Museum. Archived from the original on 8 March 2016. – blueprint.
- MGH 6799 – Petroleum Warfare (Film). Imperial War Museum. 1941.
- WOY 770 – Petroleum Warfare Material (Film). Imperial War Museum. 1943.
- WPN 220 – War Pictorial News – Defence by Fire (Film). Imperial War Museum. 1945.

National Archive documents

- "NA SUPP 15/29 – Design and installation of flame traps". The National Archives.
- "NA PREM 3/264 – LUCID operation (fireships)". The National Archives.
- "NA MUN 5 – Gas and Chemical Supplies". The National Archives.
- "NA WO 199/1433 – Flame Fougasses". The National Archives.
- "NA WO 193/734 – Use of oil for defensive and offensive purposes". The National Archives.
- "NA FO 898/70 – SIBS". The National Archives.
- "NA CAB 79 – Minutes of cabinet meetings". The National Archives.
- Y.M. Streatfield. "The Major Developments in Political Warfare, 1938–1945" (PDF). Institute of Communications Studies. University of Leeds. Facsimile of: CAB 101/131, The National Archives.
