= Phosphoglucan, water dikinase =

Identifiers
- EC no.: 2.7.9.5
- CAS no.: 912567-76-1

Databases
- IntEnz: IntEnz view
- BRENDA: BRENDA entry
- ExPASy: NiceZyme view
- KEGG: KEGG entry
- MetaCyc: metabolic pathway
- PRIAM: profile
- PDB structures: RCSB PDB PDBe PDBsum
Search
- PMC: articles
- PubMed: articles
- NCBI: proteins

In enzymology, a phosphoglucan, water dikinase (EC 2.7.9.5) is an enzyme that catalyzes the chemical reaction

ATP + [phospho-alpha-glucan] + H_{2}O $\rightleftharpoons$ AMP + O-phospho-[phospho-alpha-glucan] + phosphate

The 3 substrates of this enzyme are ATP, phospho-alpha-glucan, and H_{2}O, whereas its 3 products are AMP, [[O-phospho-[phospho-alpha-glucan]]], and phosphate.

This enzyme belongs to the family of transferases, to be specific, those transferring phosphorus-containing groups (phosphotransferases) with paired acceptors (dikinases). The systematic name of this enzyme class is ATP:phospho-alpha-glucan, water phosphotransferase. Other names in common use include PWD, and OK1.
