= Livens =

Livens may refer to:

- George Henry Livens (1886–1950), British mathematician
- Jānis Līvens (1884–?), Latvian cyclist who competed in the 1912 Summer Olympics
- William Howard Livens (1889–1964), British soldier and inventor of chemical and flame weapons

== See also ==
- Livens Projector, a mortar-like weapon used for gas warfare in World War I
- Livens Large Gallery Flame Projector, a flamethrower used in World War I
- Fort Livén, a 16th century fort in what is now Chile
