= Ruston & Hornsby =

British industrial equipment manufacturer, 1918–1966

- Ruston & Hornsby logo
- Type: Private
- Industry: Engineering
- Predecessor: Ruston, Proctor and Company
- Founded: 1918
- Fate: Purchased by English Electric
- Headquarters: Waterside South, Lincoln, England
- Products: Diesel engines, Locomotives, Steam engines, Gas turbines
- Parent: English Electric (1966–1968); GEC (1968–2003); Siemens (2003–)
- Subsidiaries: Ruston-Bucyrus

Ruston & Hornsby was an industrial equipment manufacturer in Lincoln, England founded in 1918. The company is best known as a manufacturer of narrow and standard gauge diesel locomotives and also of steam shovels. Other products included cars, steam locomotives and a range of internal combustion engines, and later gas turbines. It is now a subsidiary of Siemens, its Diesel business went to MAN Energy Solutions that in 2025 still provides support for Ruston-engines.

== Background ==
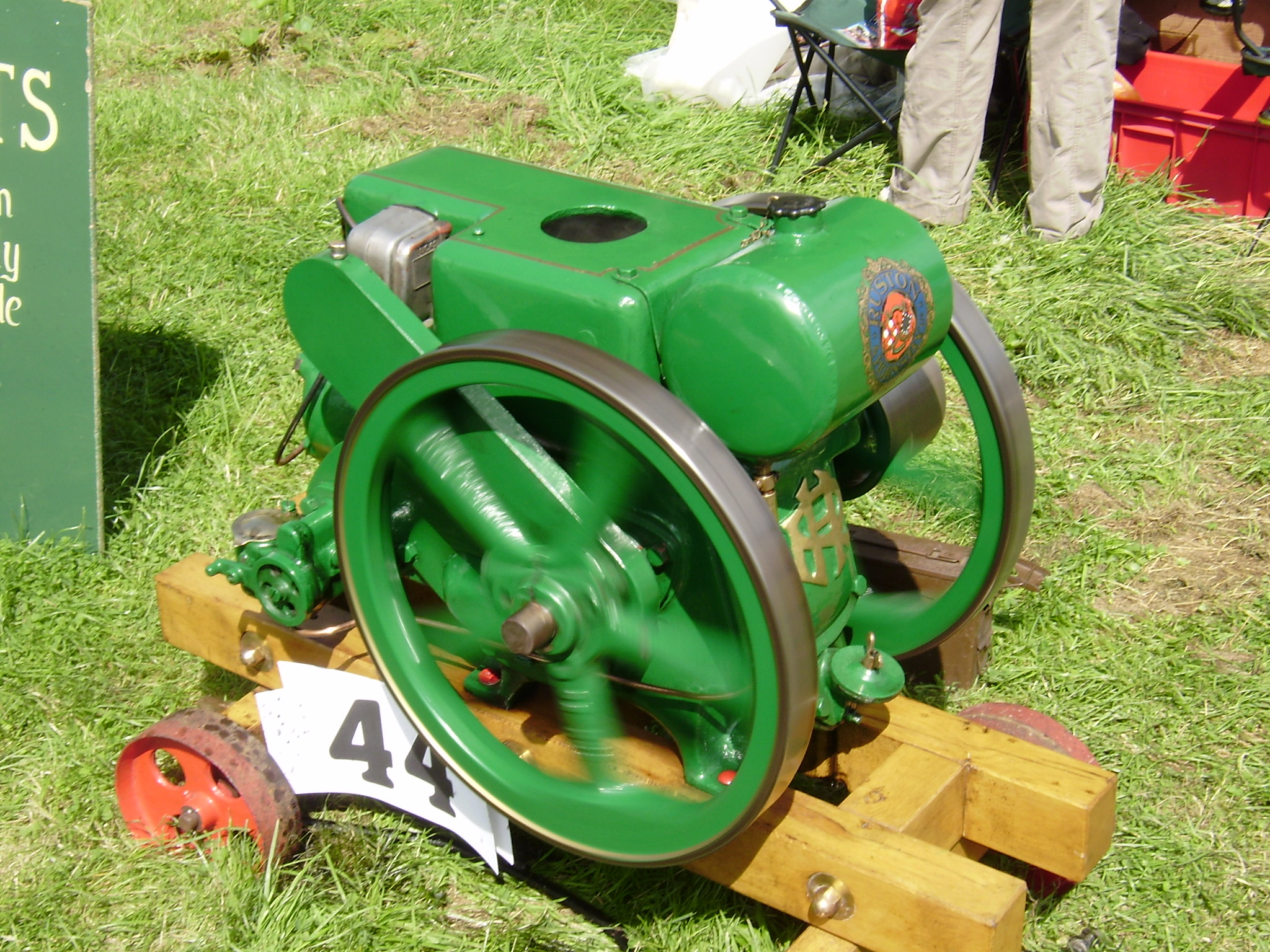
A 3hp Ruston engine type PB of 1935

Proctor & Burton was established in 1840, operating as millwrights and engineers. It became Ruston, Proctor and Company in 1857 when Joseph Ruston joined them, acquiring limited liability status in 1899. From 1866 it built a number of four and six-coupled tank locomotives, one of which was sent to the Paris Exhibition in 1867. In 1868 it built five 0-6-0 tank engines for the Great Eastern Railway to the design of Samuel Waite Johnson. Three of these were converted to crane tanks, two of which lasted until 1952, aged eighty-four. Among the company's output were sixteen for Argentina and some for T. A. Walker, the contractor building the Manchester Ship Canal.

During the First World War, Ruston assisted in the war effort, producing some of the first tanks and a number of aircraft, notably the Sopwith Camel.

== Ruston & Hornsby ==
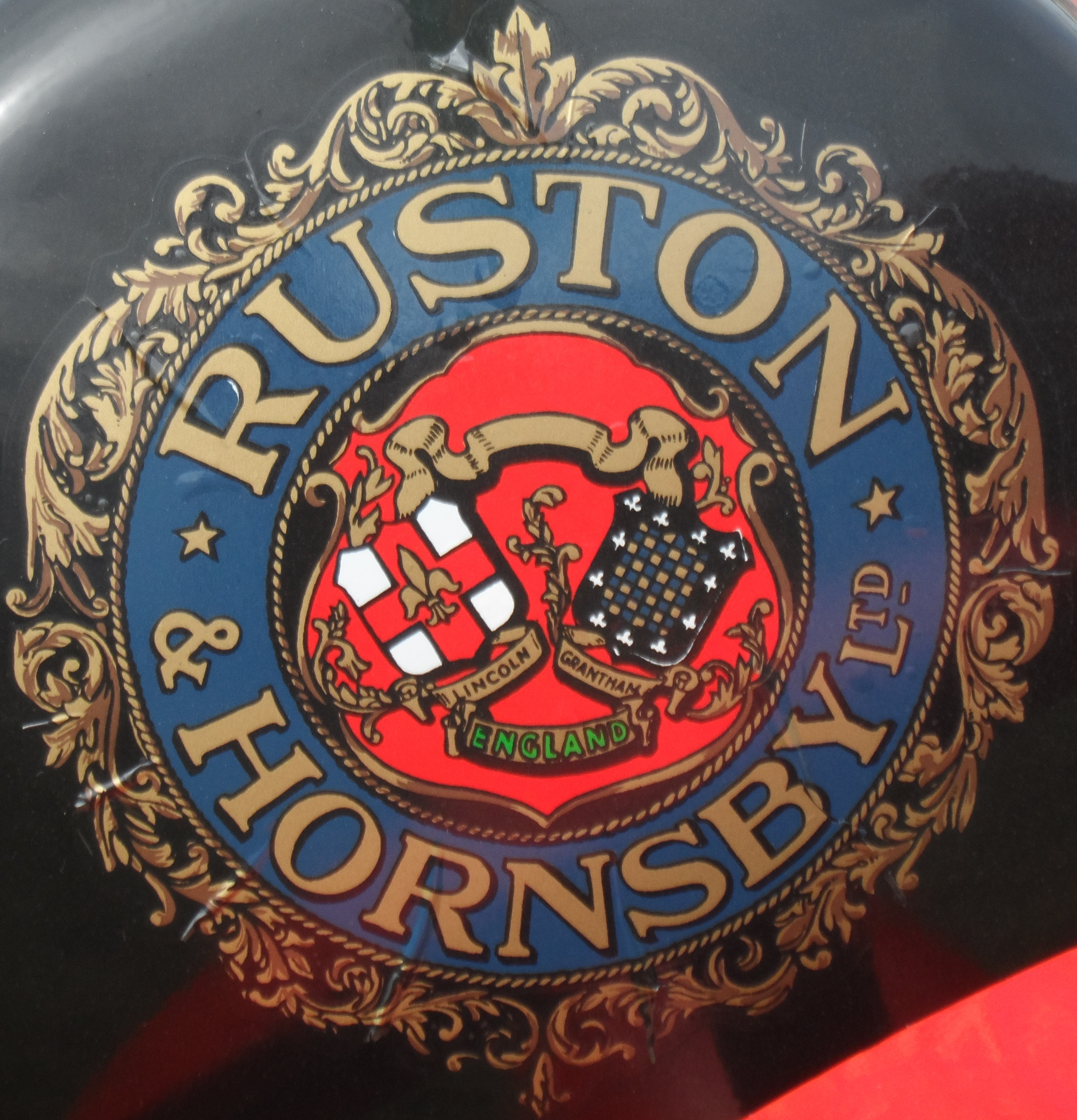
Ruston & Hornsby badge, displaying the arms of Lincoln and Grantham

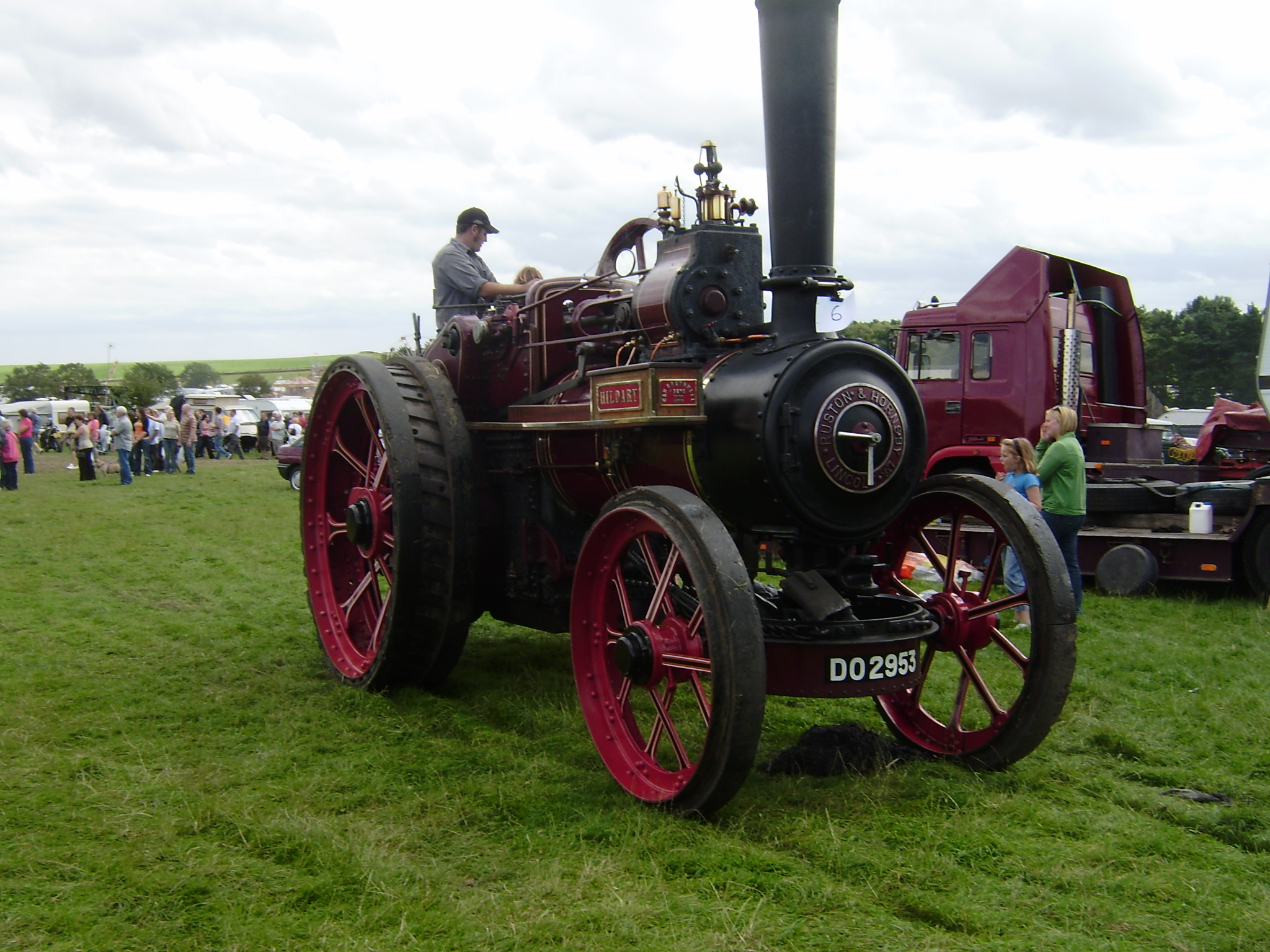
Ruston & Hornsby traction engine of 1922 (ser.no.115100)

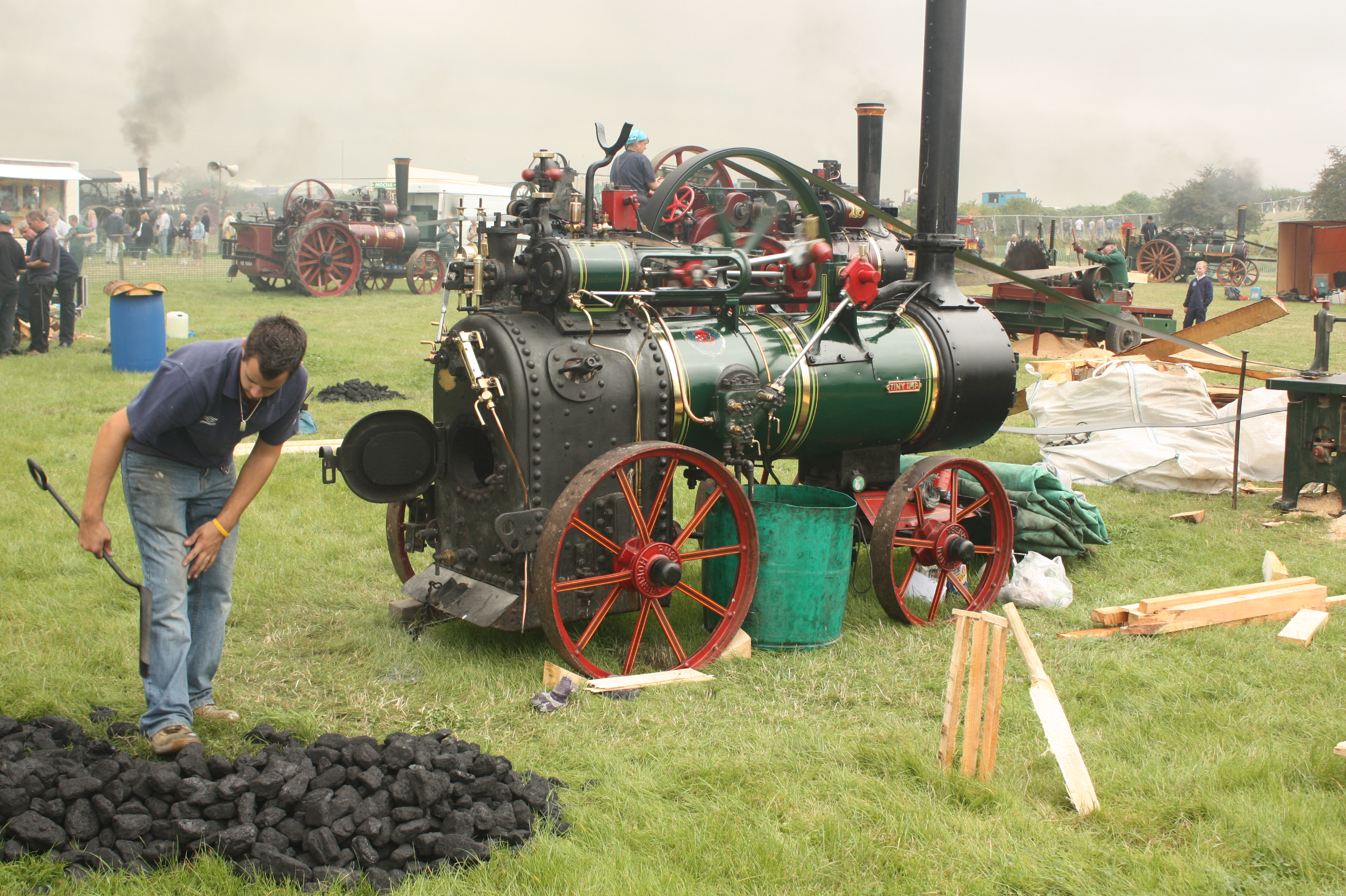
Ruston & Hornsby 2 hp portable engine no. 163844 Tiny Imp at GDSF 2008

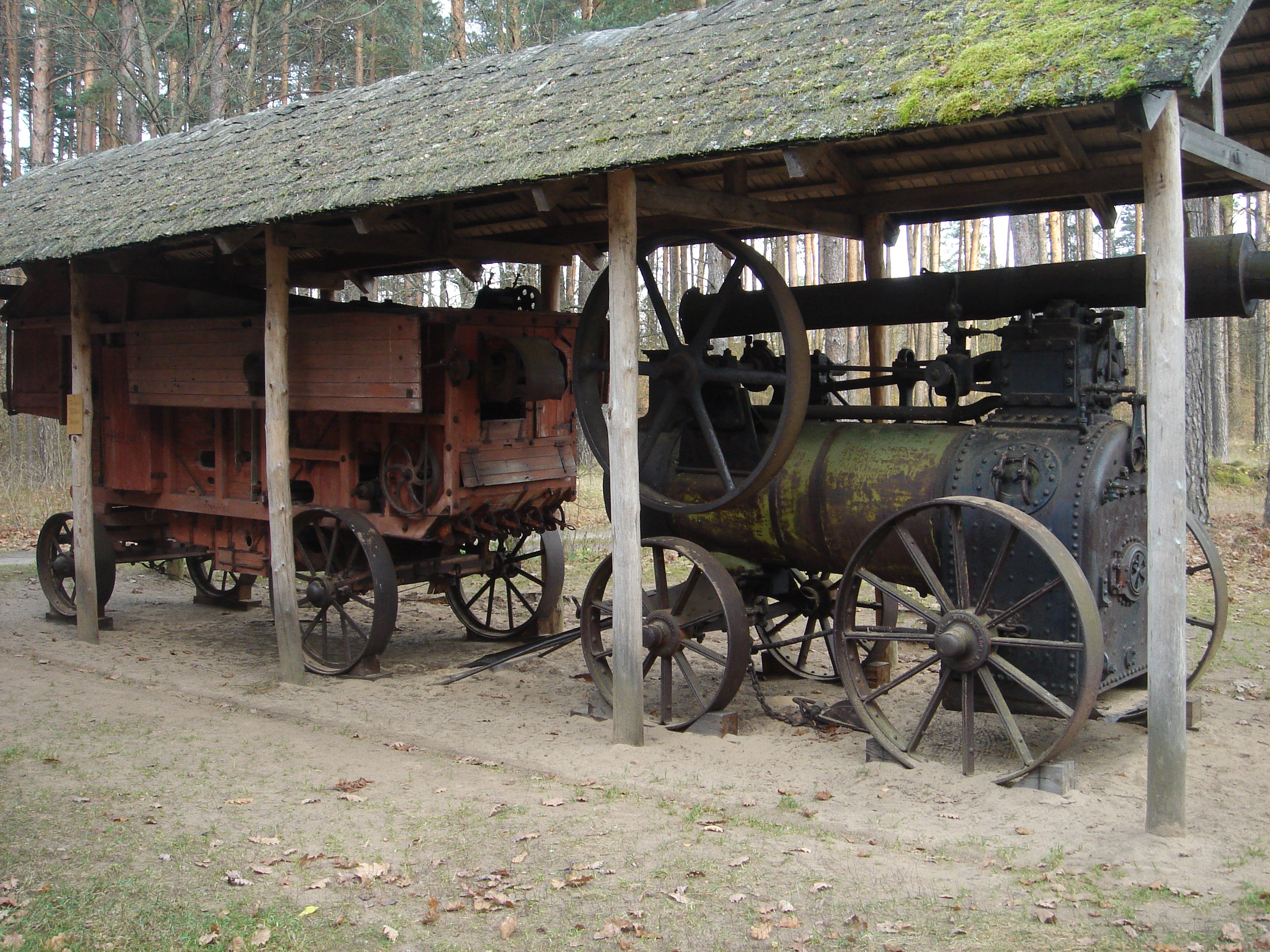
Ruston & Hornsby threshing machine (left) 2nd half of the 19th century (SN 27894) at Riga open-air museum (Latvia)

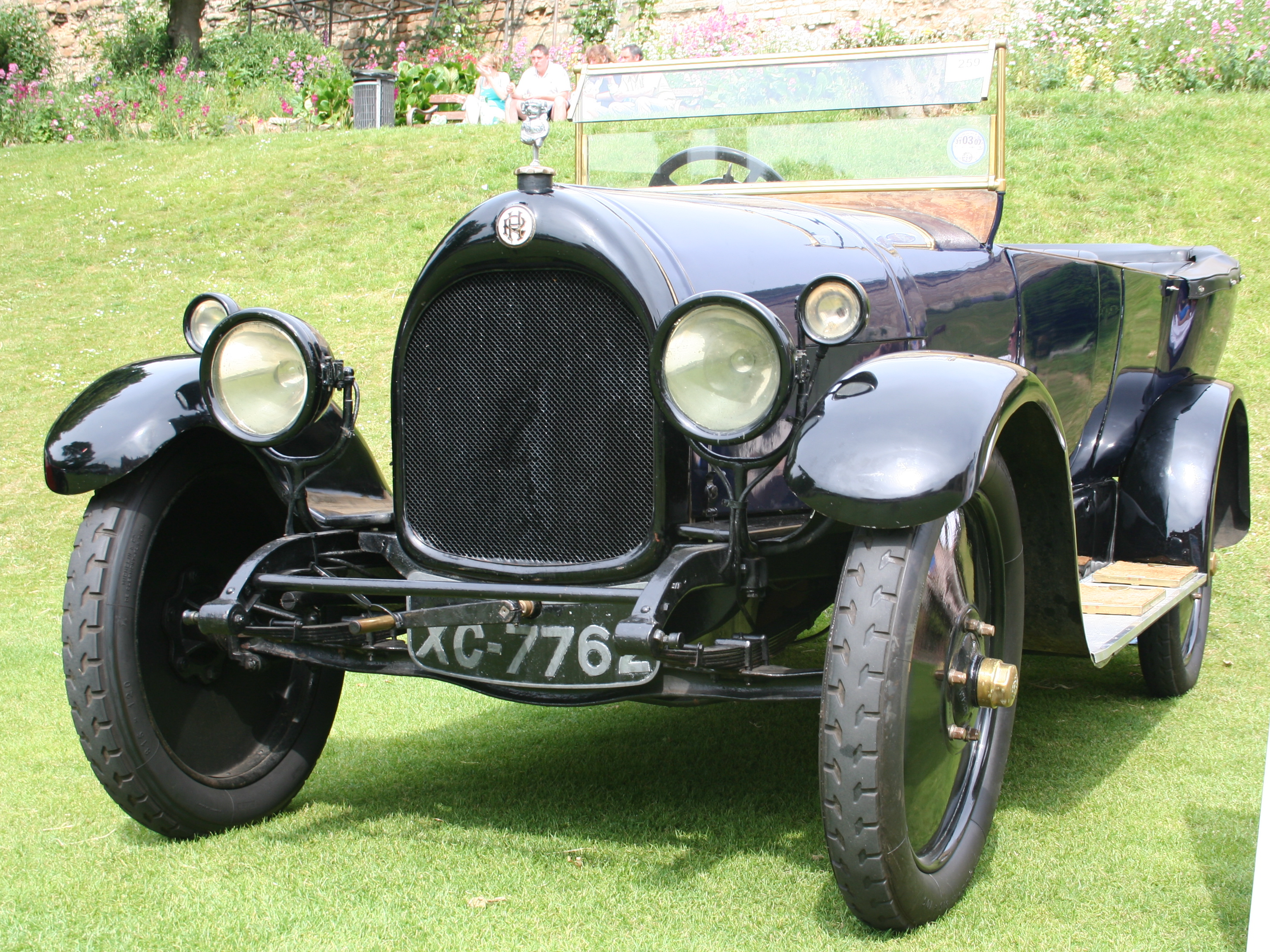
1920 Ruston & Hornsby car

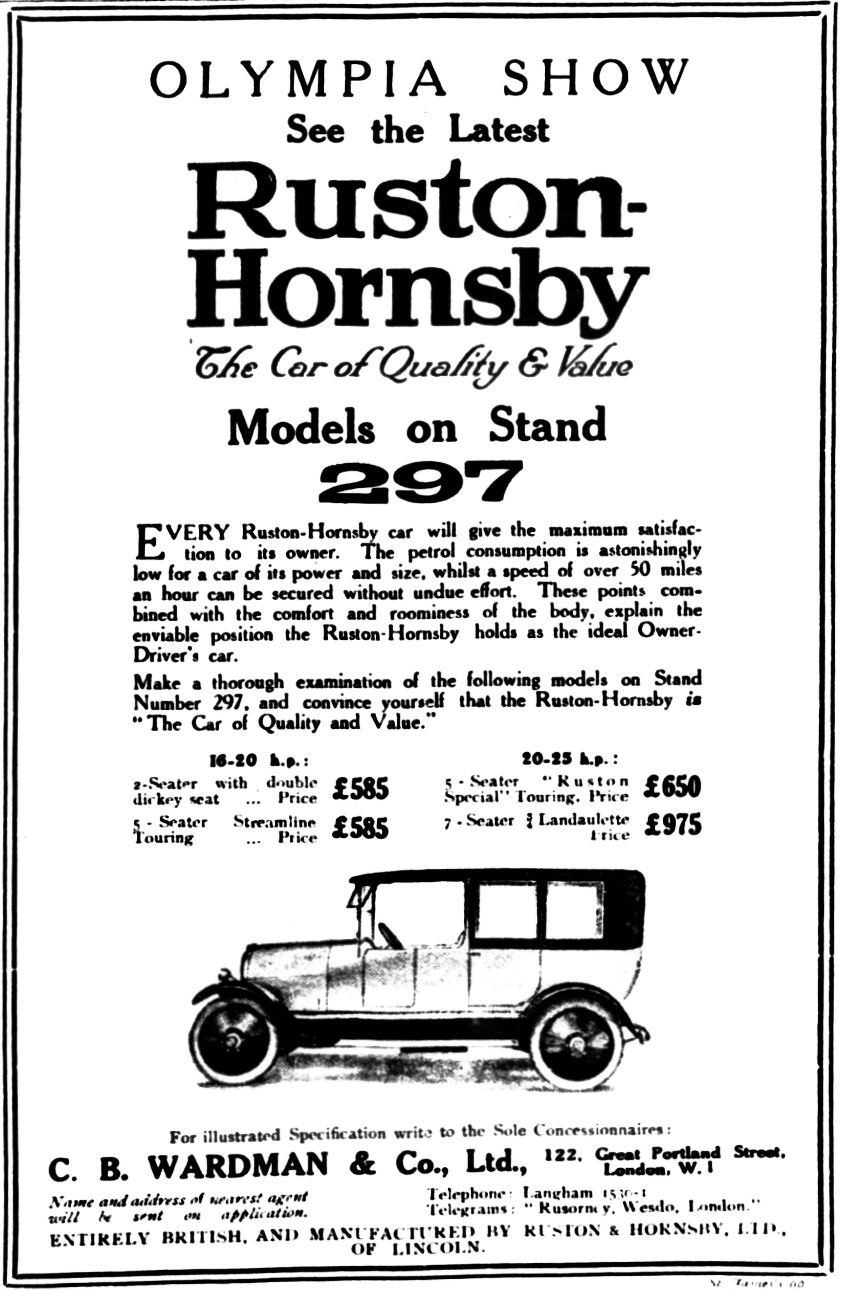
Ruston-Hornsby A1 A3 (1919-1924)

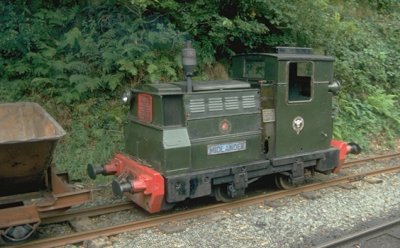
Talyllyn Railway No. 5, built by Ruston & Hornsby in 1940

On 11 September 1918, Ruston, Proctor and Company merged with Richard Hornsby & Sons of Grantham to become Ruston and Hornsby Ltd (R&H). Hornsby was the world leader in heavy oil engines, having been building them since 1891, a full eight years before Rudolph Diesel's engine was produced commercially.

Ruston built oil and diesel engines in sizes from a few horsepower up to large industrial engines. Several R&H engines are on display at the Anson Engine Museum at Poynton, Manchester and also at Internal Fire - Museum of Power, Tanygroes near Cardigan. The company also diversified into the manufacture of petrol engines, again from around 1.5 hp (1.1 kW) upwards, some of these designs were later manufactured under licence by The Wolseley Sheep Shearing Machine Company.

=== Steam machinery ===
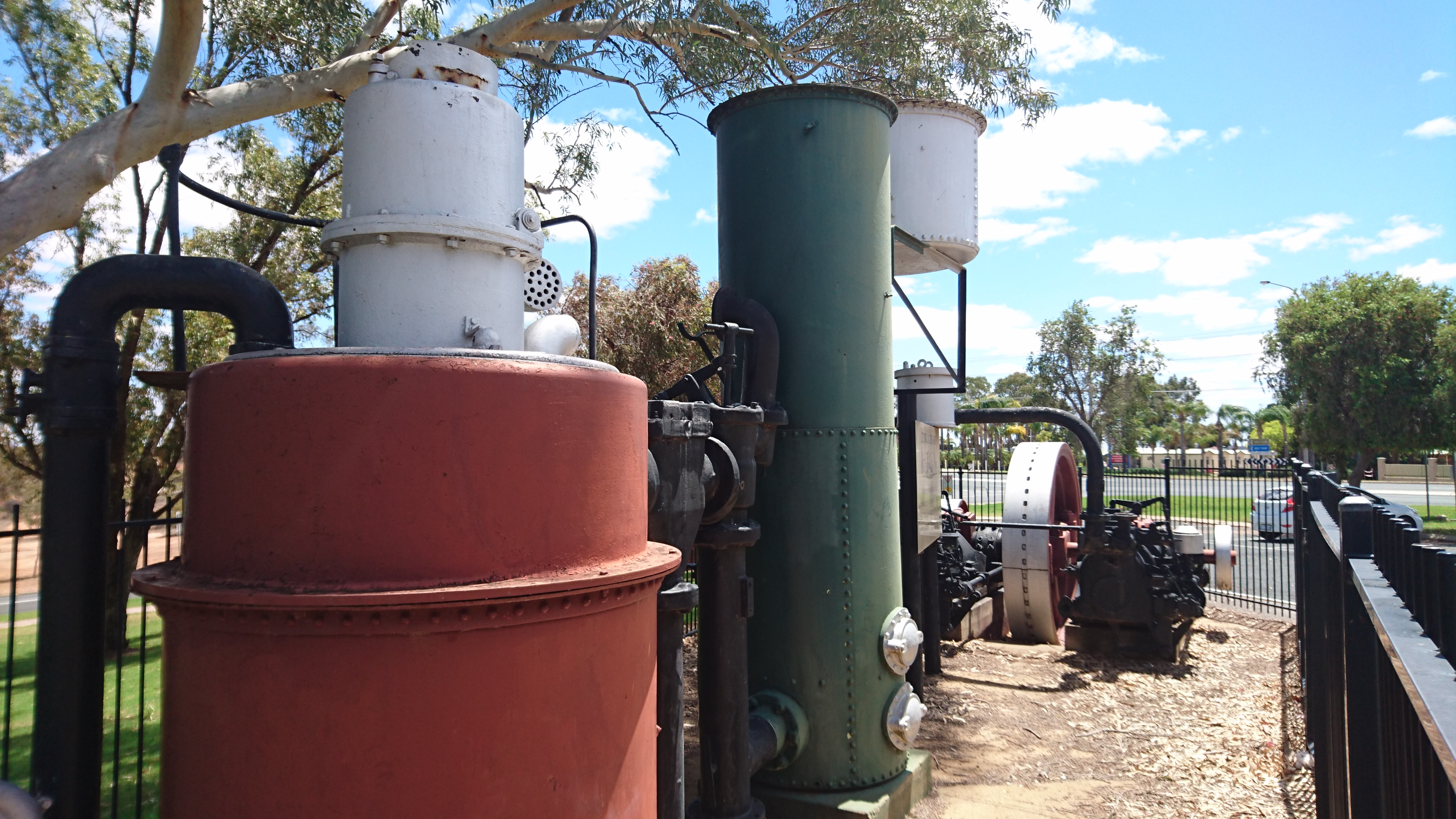
Rushton 2cyl gas engine, at Dareton, New South Wales (Wentworth Region). The coke gas producer is at left, that feeds the 2cylinder 128 horsepower (95 kW) engine with 6 ton flywheel. This ran the irrigation pump to draw water from the Murray River for the Coomealla Irrigation Area. It is now an exhibit in a park in the town.

The firm were builders of steam engines and portable steam engines for many years, mainly for the agricultural market; however, they also created steam rollers which were used for making roads and owned by contractors and councils.

=== First World War ===
In the First World War, the company made around 2,750 aeroplanes and 3,000 aero engines. The 1,000th Sopwith Camel (B7380), built at the plant in 1917, was named the Wings of Horus. The company built around 1,600 Sopwith Camels, 250 Sopwith 1½ Strutters, and 200 Royal Aircraft Factory B.E.2s. The company, as Ruston & Proctor, was the largest British builder of aero-engines in the war, and built the largest bomb of the war. One of the directors, Frederick Howard Livens, had a son who was an army officer on the front line. Captain William Howard Livens was sent to Lincoln, where he developed the Livens Projector and the Livens Large Gallery Flame Projector.

Neighbouring manufacturer Clayton & Shuttleworth also built planes.

In 1919, Colonel J.S. Ruston was inspired to create a garden suburb in Lincoln – the Swanpool Garden Suburb. His vision was to provide affordable houses for his workers, with easy access to healthy outdoor recreation, such as a pleasure ground, cricket ground and swimming baths. Ruston purchased 25 acres of the Boultham Hall estate and established the Swanpool Co-operative Society. Architects Hennell and James of London created the designs for the houses, which were built between April 1919 and September 1920. The vision for the new suburb included a technical institute, church and schools. After running into financial difficulties the development was sold in 1925 to Swanpool Garden Suburb Ltd, a private company, but only 113 of the planned 2–3000 houses had been constructed and no more were built.

=== The Ruston-Hornsby car ===
After the First World War the company attempted to diversify and one outcome was the Ruston-Hornsby car. Two versions were made, a 15.9 hp (11.9 kW) with a Dorman 2614 cc engine and a larger 20 hp (15 kW) model with a 3308 cc engine of their own manufacture. The cars were, however, very heavy, being built on a 9 in (230 mm) chassis, and extremely expensive – the cheapest was around £440 and the most expensive nearly £1,000, within a few years other makers were selling similar vehicles that weighed only 3/4 long ton (760 kg) ton and cost around £120–200 – and never reached the hoped-for production volumes. About 1,500 were made between 1919 and 1924, two of which are still retained by Siemens on the Lincoln site. One is fully restored in running/driving condition, while the second example is still awaiting attention.

The R-H car was developed by the chief engineer, Edward Boughton, who joined the company in 1916 after helping to develop the tank. Later he would start the Automotive Products Group (APG) in Leamington Spa in 1920 which made Borg & Beck clutches, Lockheed hydraulic brakes, and Purolator fuel filters.

=== Second World War ===
In September 1944, when the German Wehrmacht OB West headquarters at Saint-Germain-en-Laye (near Paris) were captured, previously commanded by Field Marshal Günther von Kluge (from 2 July 1944), they were found to be powered by Ruston diesel engines.

It built the first prototype of the Valiant tank in 1944. The Grantham site built the Matilda II tank.

== Diesels and gas turbines ==
Ruston & Hornsby was a major producer of small and medium diesel engines for land and marine applications. The company began to build diesel locomotives in 1931 (and continued up until 1967). It was a pioneer and major developer in the industrial application of small (up to 10 MW) heavy duty gas turbines from the 1950s onwards. In the 1960s it was Europe's leading supplier of land-based gas turbines. It introduced Dry Low Emission (DLE) combustion technology in the mid-1990s becoming market leaders.

The initiation of the production and design of gas turbines was largely due to Bob Feilden CBE (1917–2004) who joined the company in 1946. Gas turbines were first produced in 1952.

The Beevor Foundry on Beevor Street was opened in 1950 by General Sir William Joseph Slim (later Field Marshal William Slim, 1st Viscount Slim), and claimed to be the biggest foundry in Europe.

In the 1950s, it was producing one turbine a fortnight. The company sold its 1,000th gas turbine in July 1977. It won the MacRobert Award in December 1983 for the Tornado gas turbine. The company's Cambridge-educated Egyptian chairman, Dr Waheeb Rizk OBE, was concurrently President of the IMechE from 1984 to 1985 and also President of the International Council on Combustion Engines from 1973 to 1977. He was Managing Director from 1971 to 1983 and developed the W layout for gas turbine power stations that were used as emergency generating stations for the National Grid, also known as peaking power plants. These had to be developed due to prolonged electricity blackouts in south-east England in 1961 caused by cascading failure. It built the first gas turbine to burn North Sea gas, for the Eastern Gas Board in Watford. In 1981 it won an order to power the Urengoy–Pomary–Uzhgorod pipeline (Trans-Siberian Pipeline).

Research work was done in conjunction with the University of Sussex and with Cranfield University in the 1980s, where extensive development was undertaken of the combustion chamber and of the gallery to the turbine.

== Gas turbine product range ==
Industrial Gas Turbines of note manufactured at the Lincoln plant:

- TA
- TB
- TD
- Typhoon (SGT-100)
- Tornado (SGT-200)
- Tempest (SGT-300)
- Cyclone (SGT-400)

== Boilers ==
Until the late 1960s, it produced Thermax boilers. The boiler business was sold for £1.75m to Cochrane & Co of Annan, Dumfries and Galloway in October 1968, that was bought by John Thompson of Wolverhampton four months later. It was bought by Clarke Chapman in 1970.

== Energy schemes ==
In 1957, it was the first company to fit a main Royal Navy ship (HMS Cumberland) with a (experimental) gas turbine.

In 1959, it opened a new type of power plant using waste sewage gas that powered eight turbines at Britain's biggest sewage works at the Northern Outfall Sewer at Beckton in East London. This was an 18,000 horsepower combined heat and power plant.

The company pioneered combined heat and power schemes. The company began this technology in Cortemaggiore, Emilia-Romagna in 1956 at the Agip (Azienda Generale Italiana Petroli) oil refinery. By the late 1960s, Ruston & Hornsby CHP units were installed in Australia, Germany, the US, South America, and the Middle East.

In the 1970s, these CHP schemes were not as well developed as today because electricity companies were not interested in developing a market that would provide direct competition to themselves. CHP schemes were then known as total energy schemes, which comprised exhaust heat recovery. The company won the Queen's Award for Enterprise: International Trade (Export) in 1977, 1978 and 1982.

The large Singer factory in Clydebank, which employed 11,000 people, was notably powered by Rustons turbines. The King Faisal Specialist Hospital was installed with a CHP unit in 1975. Whitehall in London is heated and has its electricity from a CHP unit built in the late 1990s.

== Ownership and acquisitions ==
=== Paxman ===
In 1940 R&H bought a controlling interest in the well-known Paxman diesel engine company of Colchester in Essex. In the later stages of the war, Paxman built 4,000 diesel engines that powered all the British-built tank landing craft (LCT) on D-Day. It supplied diesel engines for British Rail locomotives in the 1960s. From 1954 to 1964 the company's Managing Director was Geoffrey Bone who had been part of the Power Jets team, and whose father Victor Bone was Managing Director of R&H from 1944 until his death. It was due to Geoffrey Bone that Bob Feilden was recruited for R&H who subsequently formed the gas turbine manufacturing operations.

In 1934 the company had formed Aveling-Barford from two companies Aveling & Porter of Kent and Barford & Perkins of Peterborough, using a former site of R&H. The company closed its Grantham diesel-engine factory in 1963.

=== English Electric ===
In November 1966, R&H was purchased by English Electric. Robert Inskip, 2nd Viscount Caldecote became Chairman of the company. Subsidiaries of R&H included Bergius-Kelvin of Glasgow, Davey, Paxman & Co of Colchester (now owned by MAN Energy Solutions) and Alfred Wiseman Gears in Grantham.

Up to that point, the company had been listed on the London Stock Exchange. This formed Britain's second largest diesel engine group, second to Hawker-Lister. From that moment on it was a subsidiary of a larger company. It became known as the Ruston Turbine Division of English Electric Diesels.

Following the acquisition by English Electric the production of large Ruston engines was moved to the English Electric Vulcan Foundry factory in Newton-le-Willows. The production of the smaller engine range was moved to Stafford where it became a part of the Dorman Diesel range. Turbine technology was concentrated in Lincoln with Napier turbochargers moving from Liverpool to Lincoln in 1967. In 1969 the Lincoln site became Ruston Gas Turbines. The name was then changed to European Gas Turbines in 1989 following the merger of GEC and Alcatel Alsthom. Later this business was sold to Siemens. The gas turbine business is still in the old Ruston factory in the centre of Lincoln.

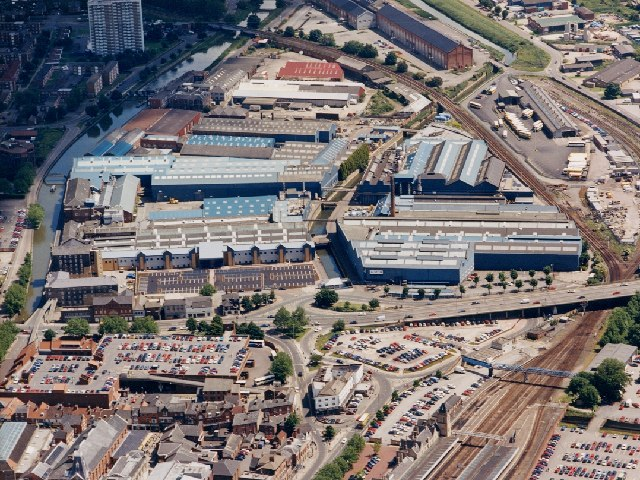
Pelham Works, Lincoln next to the A15

=== GEC and Alstom ===
R&H was included in the purchase of English Electric by the General Electric Company (GEC) in 1968. By the end of 1969 the Lincoln subsidiary company was known as Ruston Gas Turbines.

The Ruston Paxman diesels division became known as Ruston Diesels, and moved to the former English Electric diesel works. The former Power Jets plant at Whetstone became a research plant for the gas turbine division of GEC. GEC then merged its heavy engineering division with Alsthom of France, becoming part of GEC-Alsthom in 1989, which changed its name to Alstom in 1998, when the Lincoln subsidiary was known as EGT (European Gas Turbines).

=== Siemens ===
In 2003, Alstom sold its gas turbine division (in Lincoln and Franche-Comté) to Siemens. The site of the former headquarters at Thorngate House, on the opposite side of the A15, was redeveloped as residential flats.

== Economy of Lincoln ==
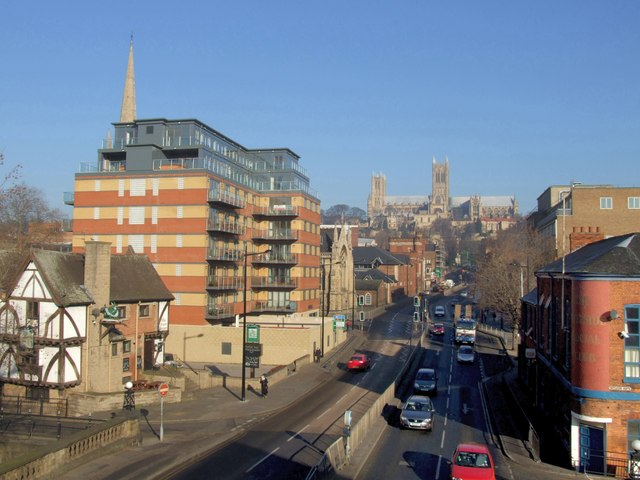
Former site of Thorngate House in Lincoln, which was demolished in 2004 and redeveloped for residential use

When owned by GEC in the late 1960s and early 1970s, many (if not the vast majority) of Lincoln engineering firms did not survive difficult financial conditions. This included Clayton Dewandre, (that made vacuum and air-pressure brake servos and associated equipment for commercial vehicles). WH Dorman had been bought by English Electric in 1961 and took over an old R&H factory on Beevor Street. Dormans would be bought by Perkins in 1993, then closed in 1995.

Only the GEC group of companies in Lincoln (including Dormans) survived the 1970s. The company actually expanded during this difficult time, helped by the fact that 80% of its engines were exported and the North Sea oil industry was rapidly expanding at this time, which required portable electricity generation and heating.

== Manufacturing plants ==
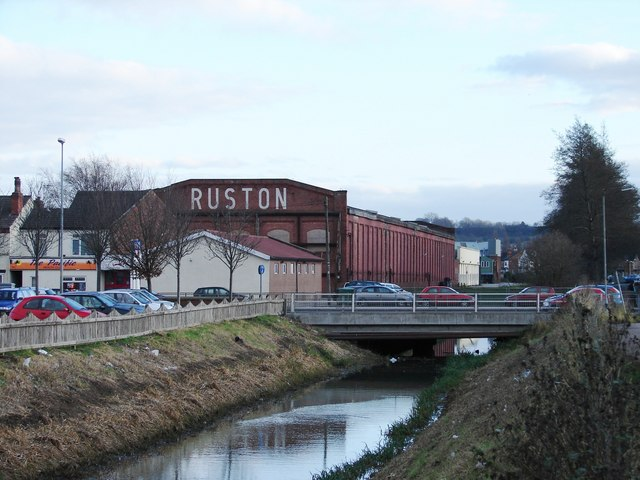
Former works off Tritton Road

The original Ruston works (Waterside South, Lincoln) focused on Gas Turbine manufacture from 1967 becoming the head office of Ruston Gas Turbines. Napier Turbochargers, that had been owned by English Electric since 1942, moved to the site from Liverpool.

With the change of ownership in 1989 the name was changed to European Gas Turbines Ltd. Following a spell as Alstom Gas Turbines Ltd, the company is now known as Siemens Industrial Turbomachinery Ltd. The design and research centre in Lincoln opened in May 1957. Siemens announced in September 2009 that Gas Turbine packaging operations were to move abroad with the Lincoln site becoming a feeder plant.

The plant was taken over by William Sinclair Horticulture, who ceased using it in 2015. The building was demolished in 2019.

The Vulcan Foundry in Newton-le-Willows in Merseyside was known as Ruston Diesels (formerly Ruston Paxman Diesels) until 2002. It was taken over by MAN Diesel on 12 June 2000.

== Market focus ==
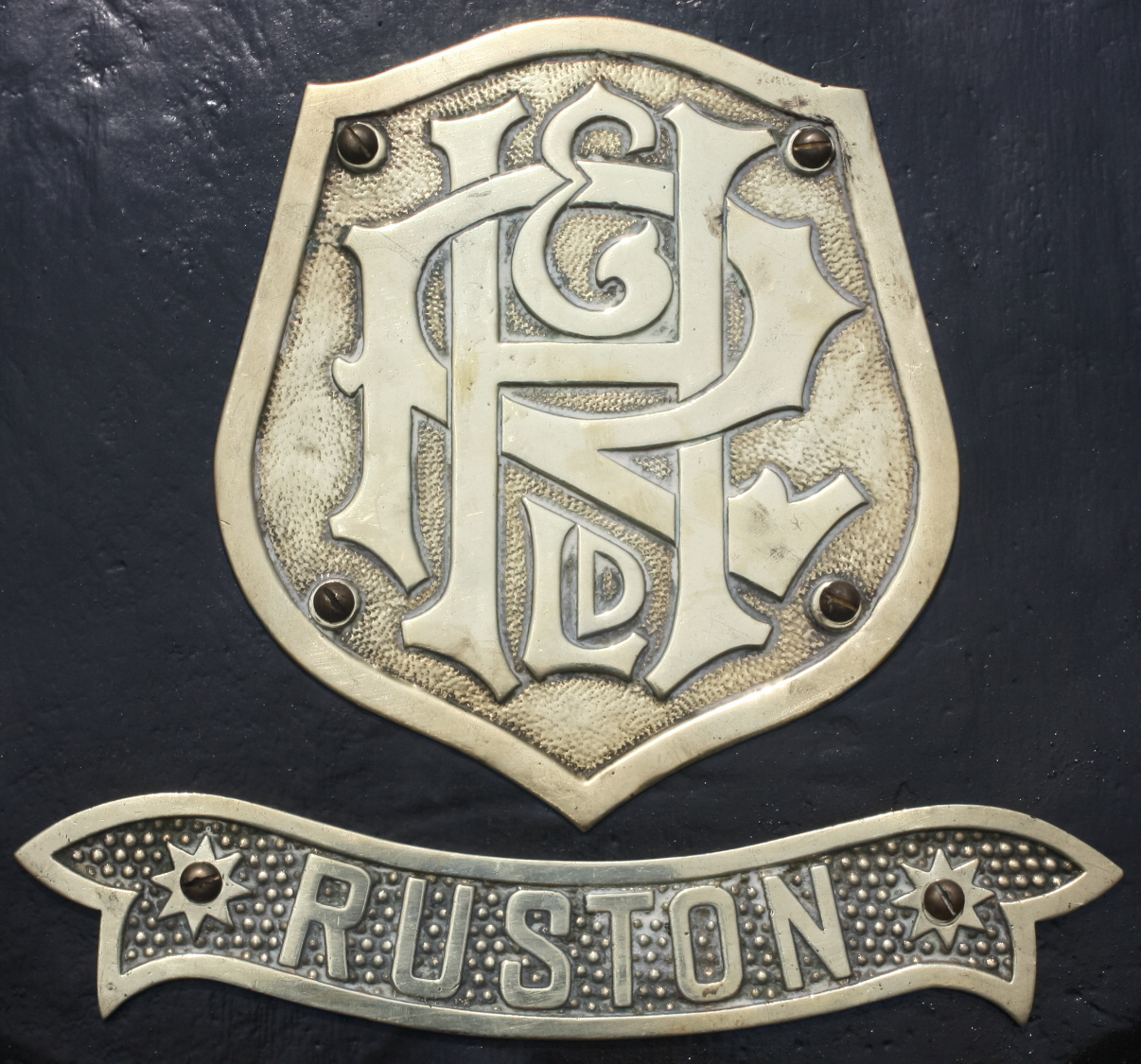
Ruston & Hornsby headstock badge

Rustons – in its various incarnations – was always an engine producer rather than a machine producer, and it could be considered that they simply produced machines in order to sell engines.

== Locomotives ==
Works No,	Image	Build Year	Model	Gauge	Original Owner	Current Status	Comments
313394		1952	165DS	Standard	New to Associated Ethyl Co. Ltd, Amlwch, Anglesey later became Associated Octel Co. Ltd	Preserved; Telford Steam Railway On hire to Chasewater railway	
458959		1961	48DS	Standard	AEI Lamp & Lighting; Harworth, Notts		

== Preserved locomotives ==
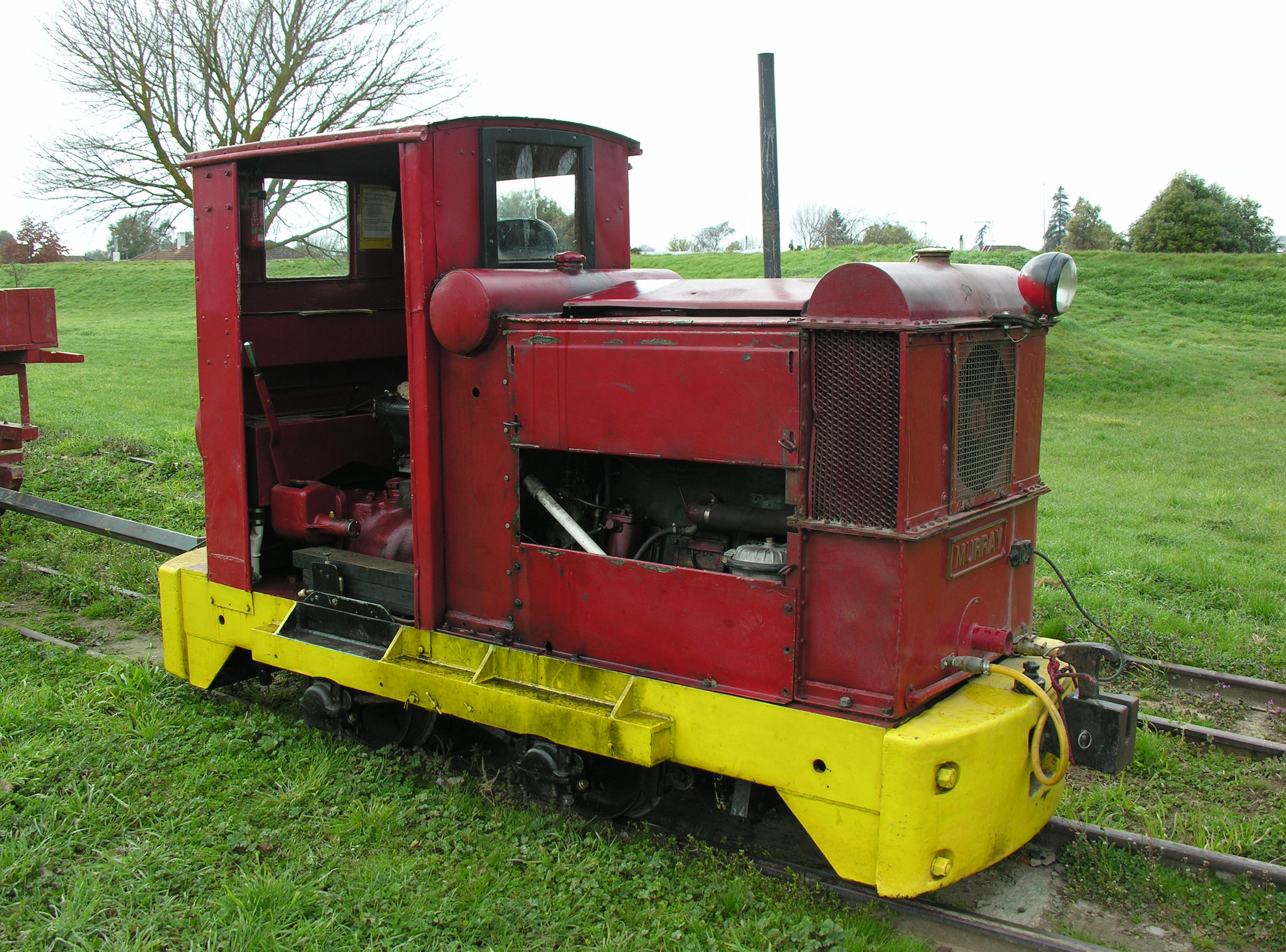
"Murray" a 2 ft (610 mm) gauge locomotive, on the Blenheim Riverside Railway

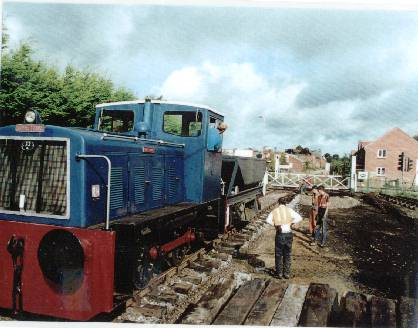
"County School" a standard gauge locomotive, on the Mid-Norfolk Railway

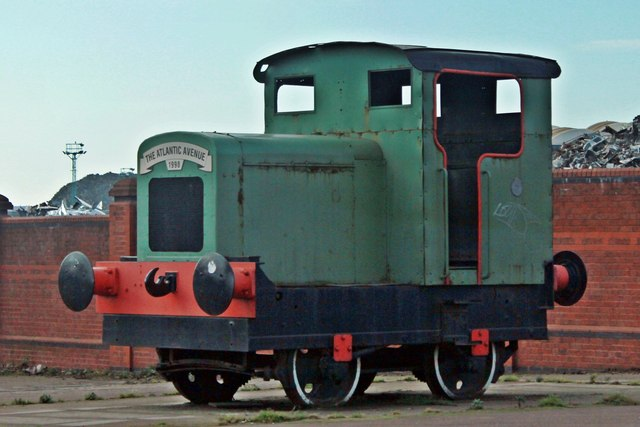
Ruston 48DS 0-4-0 diesel shunter "The Atlantic Avenue, 1998" on public display, in Bootle, Liverpool

Heritage railways with Ruston & Hornsby locomotives include :

Australia

- Bennett Brook Railway, Perth, Western Australia
- Don River Railway, Devonport, Tasmania

Denmark

- Danish Railway Museum, Denmark

France

- Train de Rillé, France

Indonesia

- Cepu Forest Railway, Indonesia

Ireland

- Railway Preservation Society of Ireland, Whitehead, in County Antrim, Northern Ireland

Israel

- Israel Railway Museum, Haifa, Israel

New Zealand

- Blenheim Riverside Railway, New Zealand
- Glenbrook Vintage Railway, New Zealand
- Plains Vintage Railway, New Zealand
- Pleasant Point Museum and Railway, New Zealand

Norway

- Thamshavn Line, Norway

United Kingdom

- Abbey Pumping Station, Leicester, Leicestershire
- Amberley Museum Railway, West Sussex
- Bo'ness and Kinneil Railway, Scotland
- Bristol Harbour Railway, Gloucestershire
- Caledonian Railway, Scotland
- Cambrian Heritage Railways, Shropshire
- Colne Valley Railway, Essex
- Corris Railway, Mid-Wales
- Derwent Valley Light Railway, York
- Ecclesbourne Valley Railway, Derbyshire
- Electric Railway Museum, Warwickshire (now closed)
- Embsay and Bolton Abbey Steam Railway, Yorkshire
- Epping Ongar Railway, Essex
- Fife Heritage Railway, Fife, in Scotland
- Foxfield Railway, Staffordshire
- Great Central Railway (Nottingham), Nottingham
- Gunpowder Railway, Waltham Abbey
- Helston Railway, Cornwall
- Leadhills and Wanlockhead Railway, Scotland
- Leighton Buzzard Light Railway, Bedfordshire
- Lincolnshire Wolds Railway, Lincolnshire
- Mid-Norfolk Railway, East Anglia
- Mid-Suffolk Light Railway, East Anglia,
- Midland Railway, Butterley, Derbyshire
- Moseley Railway Trust, Staffordshire
- Mountsorrel Railway, Leicestershire
- Northampton & Lamport Railway, Northamptonshire
- Old Kiln Light Railway, Surrey
- Purbeck Mineral and Mining Museum, Dorset
- Rutland Railway Museum, Rutland
- Scottish Industrial Railway Centre, Ayrshire, in Scotland
- Severn Valley Railway, Shropshire/Worcestershire
- Steeple Grange Light Railway, Derbyshire
- Strathspey Railway, Inverness-shire, Scotland
- Swindon and Cricklade Railway, Wiltshire
- Talyllyn Railway, North-West Wales
- Welsh Highland Railway, Gwynedd, North Wales
- Whitwell & Reepham Railway Norwich, Norfolk
- Yaxham Light Railway, Norfolk
- Plym Valley Railway, Plymouth

Preserved marine engines include :

- Ross Tiger preserved 1957 fishing trawler with 7 cylinder diesel Ruston 7VG BXM as well as Ruston winch engine and two generator engines.

== Bibliography ==
- Lowe, James W. (1989) [1975]. "Ruston Proctor & Co.". British Steam Locomotive Builders. London: Guild Publishing. pp. 560–562. ISBN 0900404213.
