= William Howard Livens =

British engineer and soldier

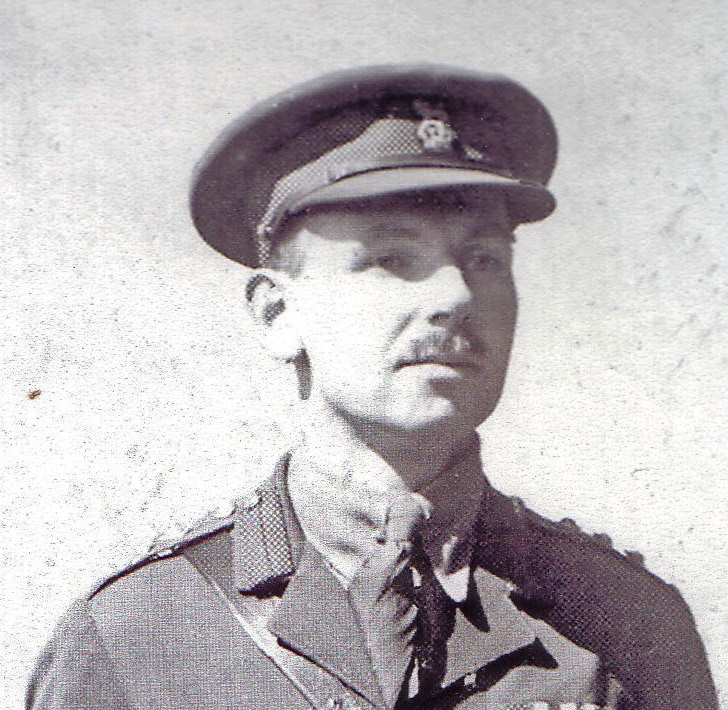
- William Howard Livens
- Born: 28 March 1889
- Died: 1 February 1964 (aged 74); London, England
- Military career
- Allegiance: United Kingdom
- Branch: British Army
- Service years: 1914–1919
- Rank: Captain (Note: A number of authors credit Livens with the rank of major or colonel. However, there is no evidence that he ever attained a rank higher than captain. According to a family tradition, he was the youngest Staff Officer in the British Army and wore the appropriate collar tabs; because these were later only worn by colonels and above, it seems possible that this distinction in uniform caused some confusion.)
- Conflicts: First World War
- Awards: Distinguished Service Order; Military Cross
- Other work: Consultant to Petroleum Warfare Department in Second World War

William Howard Livens, DSO, MC (28 March 1889 – 1 February 1964) was an English engineer, a soldier in the British Army and an inventor particularly known for the design of chemical warfare and flame warfare weapons. Resourceful and clever, Livens' successful creations were characterised by being very practical and easy to produce in large numbers. In an obituary, Sir Harold Hartley said "Livens combined great energy and enterprise with a flair for seeing simple solutions and inventive genius."

Livens is best known for inventing the Livens Projector, a simple mortar-like weapon that could throw large drums filled with inflammable or toxic chemicals. In World War I, the Livens Projector became the standard means of delivering gas attacks and it remained in the arsenal of the British army until the early years of the Second World War.

== Early life ==
Livens' parents were Frederick Howard Livens (1854–1948) and Priscilla Abbott. They married on 9 October 1886 at the Upton Congregational Church. Frederick Howard Livens was Chief Engineer and later Chairman of Ruston and Hornsby in Lincoln. Frederick and Priscilla had three children, William Howard and two younger daughters.

In 1903, Livens was sent to Oundle School, a famous public school located in the ancient market town of Oundle in Northamptonshire, England. While there, he enrolled in the Officer Training Corps (OTC) wherein he served with the rank of sergeant.

On leaving school in 1908, Livens went to Christ's College at the University of Cambridge from 1908 to October 1911. There he enrolled in the college OTC and served with the rank of private. He was captain of the Cambridge rifle team, he was a crack shot and made a record score in a competition with a team from Oxford University; he was also an excellent shot with a pistol.

Livens trained as civil engineer, and was for a while an assistant editor for Country Life magazine. But, when the First World War started, he joined the British Army.

== First World War ==
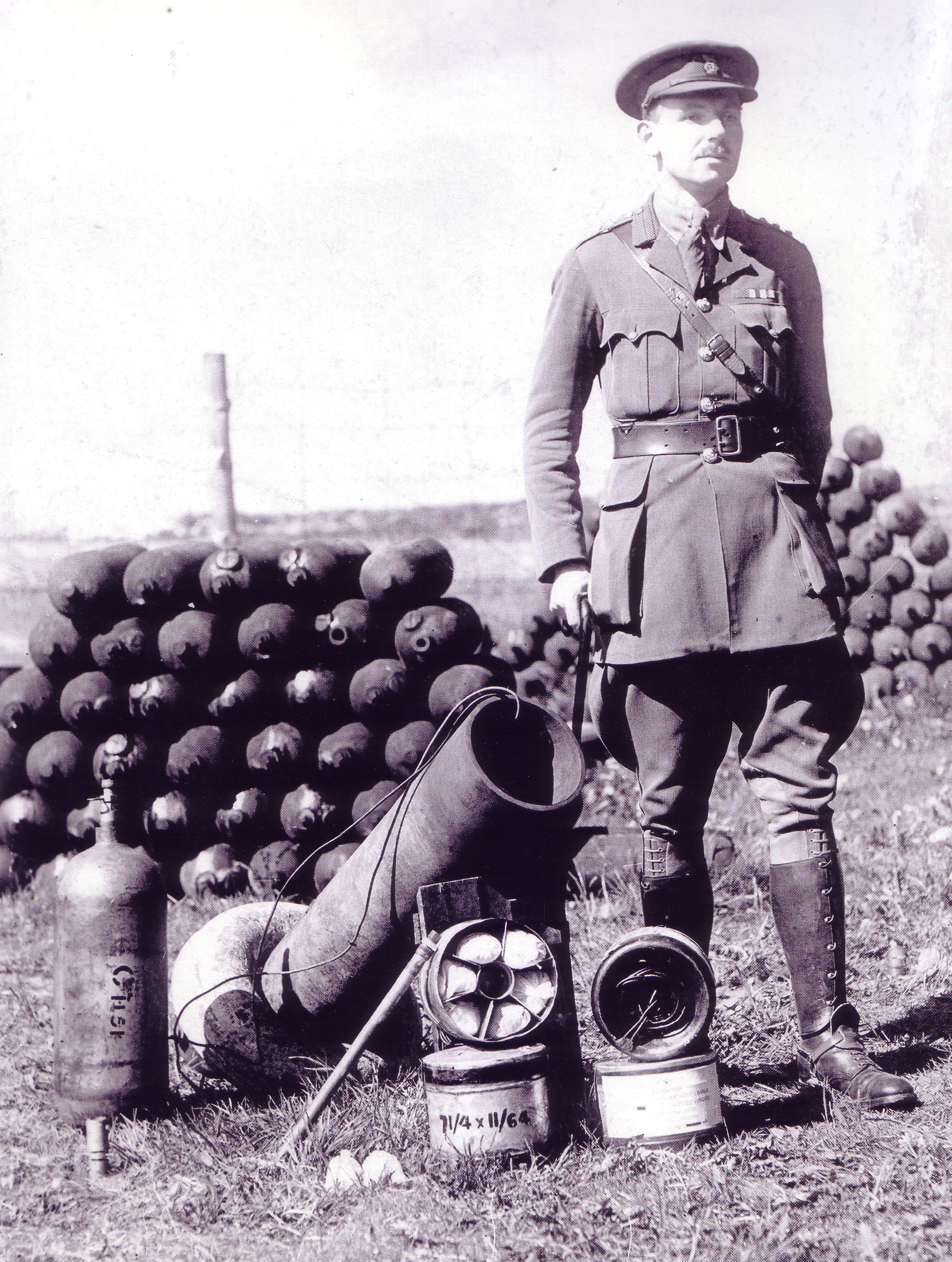
Photograph showing Livens with the components of Livens Projector

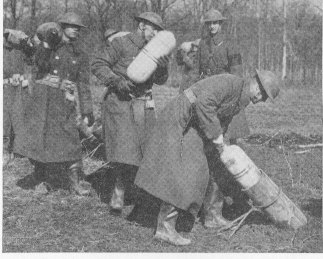
Troops loading Livens Projectors

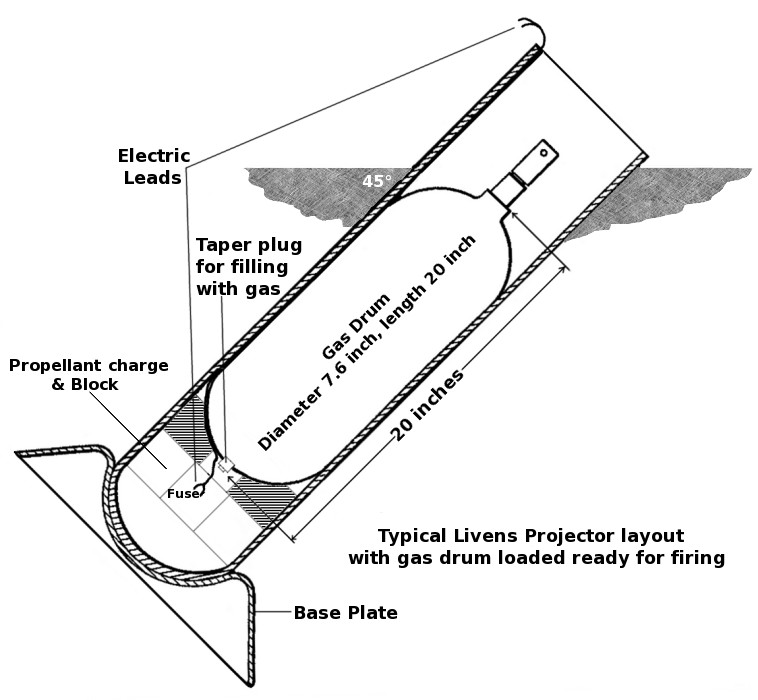
Simplified diagram showing typical layout of Livens Projector embedded in the ground at an angle of 45°, with gas drum loaded ready for firing. The thin electric leads run from the fuse in the base of the tube, up the inside of the tube and from the barrel mouth to an electric generator. When the generator plunger is depressed the electric current sparks the fuse in the base of the tube, which ignites the propellant charge and the expanding gas pressure launches the bomb out of the tube.

=== Entry into service ===
On 4 August 1914, on graduating from the Officer Training Corps, Livens applied for a commission in the Royal Engineers. He was enrolled as a second lieutenant on 30 September 1914 and he was given a clerical post in the Motorcycle signalling section at Chatham. Livens' experience of the OTC and his enthusiasm for target shooting prepared him well for at least some aspects of Army life:

When he paraded for instruction in revolver shooting the sergeant in charge, not knowing his reputation as a shot, carefully explained to him how to load his weapon and take aim and the details of firing. The supposed tyro was then told to fire 10 rounds at the target and after each shot the sergeant kept repeating sympathetically: "Sorry, Sir, you're not yet on the target". After the 10 shots had been fired Livens mildly suggested a closer look at the target and all 10 shots had hit the inner bull!

=== Weapons designs ===
==== Beginnings ====
Army life did not suppress Livens' creativity and he turned his mind to the problem of making better weapons. On his own initiative, he fitted out makeshift laboratories at his Chatham barracks bedroom and in the officers' garage. For a firing range he used vacant land near one of the old forts which overlooked the Thames estuary. Here he worked on developing flame throwers and small mortars to throw oil and gas.

Livens' inventive work was prompted by thoughts of revenge for perceived German atrocities. According to Simon Jones' book World War I Gas Warfare Tactics and Equipment, on learning of the sinking of the luxury liner RMS Lusitania in May 1915 with loss of 1,100 lives including, apparently, his wife, he vowed to kill an equal number of Germans. It was to this end that he began experimenting with gas and flame projectors of various types and continued in his work even after hearing that his wife had not, after all, been on board the Lusitania. This account cannot be literally true because Livens did not get married until 1916. (Note: A Time Team special television programme broadcast in 2011 about the Livens' large gallery flame projector gave a similar account except that it was Livens' fiancée rather than wife who was lost.) Charles Foulkes, who became Livens' commanding officer and who later wrote Gas! The Story of the Special Brigade, mentions "a strong personal feeling" connected with the sinking of the Lusitania without being more specific. According to Who's Who in World War One by John Bourne, it was the first use of poison gas by the Germans at the Second Battle of Ypres on 22 April 1915 that prompted Livens' vengeful ambitions. This alternative account is consistent with Livens' later statement that he began his experimental work at the end of April 1915.

==== Special Gas Companies ====
Late in August 1915, Livens left Chatham to join one of the newly formed Royal Engineer Special Gas Companies where he was one of very few officers to have a background in engineering rather than chemistry. At the time, gas warfare was very primitive: heavy cylinders of poison gas were manhandled to the front trenches and their contents simply vented out through metal pipes relying on a breeze to carry the toxic cloud over the enemy trenches. But the wind could be fickle and change in its direction: the first British gas attack at the Battle of Loos was a disaster. Livens developed the use of long rubber hoses to carry the gas to an optimum location for release and of a manifold that reduced the number of parapet pipes by connecting four cylinders to a single pipe, these improvements helped make the system more reliable. Major-General Foulkes described him as a "go getter", but also as unfamiliar with military protocol; Foulkes later recalled Livens' part in the preparation of a gas attack on the Hohenzollern Redoubt:

On one occasion he brushed aside all opposition at Victoria Station and filled a Pullman car with miles of rubber pipes and boxes of heavy gun-metal castings, and on reaching Boulogne he telegraphed the Quartermaster-General personally for the immediate supply of 20 lorries—which he got! "Who is the damned man Livens?" a furious voice asked me on the telephone; and when supplying the soft answer I could not help thinking that there was a lot more trouble to come.

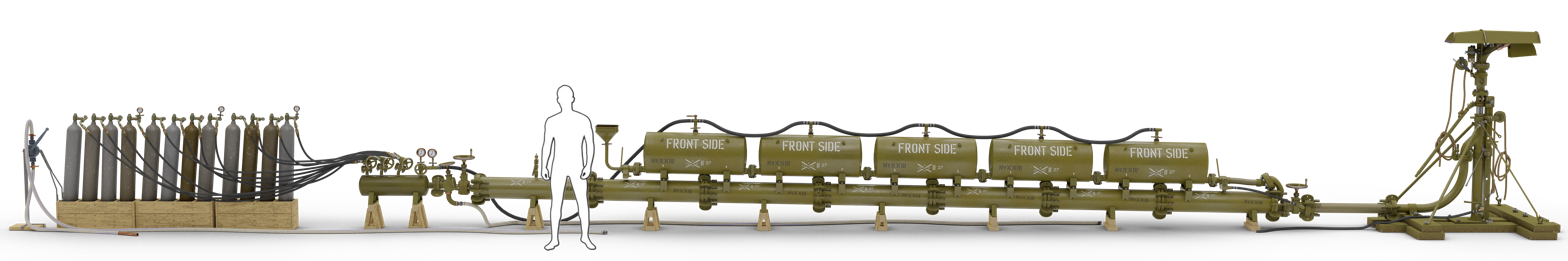
Livens Large Gallery Flame Projector

Livens was soon put in charge of Z Company, a special unit that was given the responsibility of developing a British version of the German flamethrower that had recently been deployed on the Western Front. Four of Livens' massive fixed flame projector – the "Livens Large Gallery Flame Projector" – were to be used on 1 July 1916 at the start of the Battle of the Somme. Constructed in underground chambers two were knocked out by German artillery before the offensive. The other two were effective in demoralising the German defenders. Impressive as it was, the limited range and the immobility of the weapon severely limited its usefulness except in specific circumstances such as those seen in its use at the Somme, and the project was only used once more in 1917. The remains of one of these projectors have been discovered and excavated in 2010.

==== Livens projector ====
One day, during an attack on the Somme, Z company encountered a party of Germans who were well dug in. Grenades did not succeed in shifting them, so Livens threw in two five gallon oil drums; the burning oil was so effective that Livens' comrade, Harry Strange, wondered whether it would be better to use containers to carry flame to the enemy rather than relying on a complex flame thrower. Reflecting on the incident, Livens and Strange considered how a really large shell filled with fuel might be thrown. Although the key idea of throwing a large container of oil was due to Strange, it was Livens who went on to develop a large, but simple, mortar that could throw a three-gallon drum of oil which would burst when it landed...

...he did this by throwing it out of extemporised mortars which consisted of the ordinary steel containers in which his oil was received, other oil-drums of slightly less diameter and wrapped in sand-bags being employed as projectiles. The mortars were buried in the ground in rows, almost touching each other and with only the muzzles visible above the surface, and in this manner they were set in the required direction, while pieces of metal from any that happened to burst—of which there were quite a number!—were prevented from flying about. The drums were filled with oil and cotton-waste, and they were opened up and contents were lighted and scattered by charges of gun-cotton fixed to the surface and detonated through lengths of time fuse which were lighted by the flash from the black powder propellant charge."

Livens' new weapon was used for the first time on the morning of 23 July 1916: twenty oil projectors were fired just before an attack in the battle of the Somme at Pozières – the effect was limited. Next, thirty projectors were fired at the eastern corner of High Wood on 18 August with more encouraging results and another attack on 3 September was highly successful.

Following these attacks, Livens came to the attention of General Gough who was impressed by his ideas and "wangled" everything that he needed. The new weapon was developed into the Livens Projector which consisted of a simple tube closed by a hemisphere at one end. It was half buried in the ground at an angle of 45 degrees and pointing in the required direction. It was then loaded with a single shot with an amount of propellant calculated to effect the desired range. Preparing a battery of projectors for an attack required a lot of preparation, this was not a serious problem in the conditions of static trench warfare and the weapon was so simple and inexpensive that hundreds – and on occasions thousands – of projectors could be fired simultaneously catching the enemy by surprise. Z Company rapidly developed the Livens Projector, increasing its range from the original 200 yards (180 m), first to 350 yards (320 m) and they eventually produced an electrically triggered version with a range of 1,300 yards (1,200 m).

The Livens Projector was modified to fire canisters of poison gas rather than oil. This system was tried in secret, at Thiepval in September 1916 and Beaumont-Hamel in November. The Livens Projector was able to deliver a high concentration of gas a considerable distance and each canister delivered as much gas as several chemical warfare artillery shells.

The Livens Projector was used in a series of gas attacks during October 1916 and a number of officers took a close interest in the results. Livens had witnessed some projector firings from the vantage of an aircraft and in his report he estimated that "...if the projectors were used on a large scale the cost of killing Germans could be reduced to sixteen shillings [that is £0.80 (Note: equivalent to about £60 in 2025)] each." This report was sent to the Ministry of Munitions and Livens was returned to England soon afterwards to help develop a standard projector and drum. The Livens Projector became a preferred means by which the British Army delivered a chemical attack and its production was given a high priority, the total for the Allies of the Great War eventually exceeded 150,000 units. Livens, "who was always full of ideas" gave up the command of Z company and became a liaison officer between Foulkes' Special Brigade and the Ministry of Munitions in which role he remained for the last two years of the war.

==== Other weapons ====
Livens continued to improve his projector and to design other weapons for trench warfare, some of which were useful, others not. For example, he experimented with attempts to cut barbed wire using large quantities of explosives. A witness to one trial described orange boxes filled with explosives and fired from a hole in the ground in the manner of a shell fougasse. This system failed because the explosives tended to detonate ineffectually in mid-air – a sight that was described as being: "A most impressive picture of the Day of Judgement". A variation of the Livens Projector prototype was also tested with a view to cutting wire; Major-General Foulkes later recalled: "After the shoot, as the spectators approached the target area to observe the effect that had been produced Livens noticed that one drum containing 100lb of ammonal had failed to explode, and he called out "Back everybody" as he led a hasty retreat. I think he considered this the highlight of his military career—the occasion when he barked out an order to an Army Commander (Gough) and was promptly obeyed!"

Livens' wire-cutting ideas, were characteristically simple but ultimately unsuccessful; but he was never put off if a weapon failed to come up to expectation.

==== Risks, decorations, demobilisation ====
Livens' work was dangerous and he showed no lack of physical courage. On one occasion, while testing a service gas mask against Hydrogen sulfide (H_{2}S); the gas penetrated almost immediately and Livens fell unconscious though he recovered quickly. During the war, Livens was awarded the Military Cross on 14 January 1916 and the Distinguished Service Order on 1 January 1918.

Livens was demobilised from the army on 11 April 1919.

== Between the wars ==
After the First World War, Livens, being of independent means, no longer had any incentive to produce new inventions and his life was relatively uneventful. Just before the end of the First World War, Livens wrote a patent for an improved version of his projector and in mid-June 1919, Livens and his father jointly wrote a patent for an improved projectile – the principal enhancement being the construction of strong but light-weight casing by using drawn manufacturing techniques.

In 1920, Livens applied to the Royal Commission on Awards to Inventors in respect of his wartime work on flamethrowers and the Livens Projector. He had to wait for a hearing, which was complicated by the fact that his old comrade Harry Strange also made a claim in connection with the invention. The hearing was delayed until 27 May 1922 by which time Livens had agreed that Strange should have a share of the "plunder" from any award that might be obtained. The hearing was detailed and a number of witnesses were called including the recently retired General Gough and Charles Howard Foulkes who was then a colonel. Livens was awarded £500 for his work on flamethrowers and £4,500 for the Livens projector and its ammunition. (A considerable sum: £5,000 in 1922 is equivalent to £246,000 in 2025.)

== Second World War ==
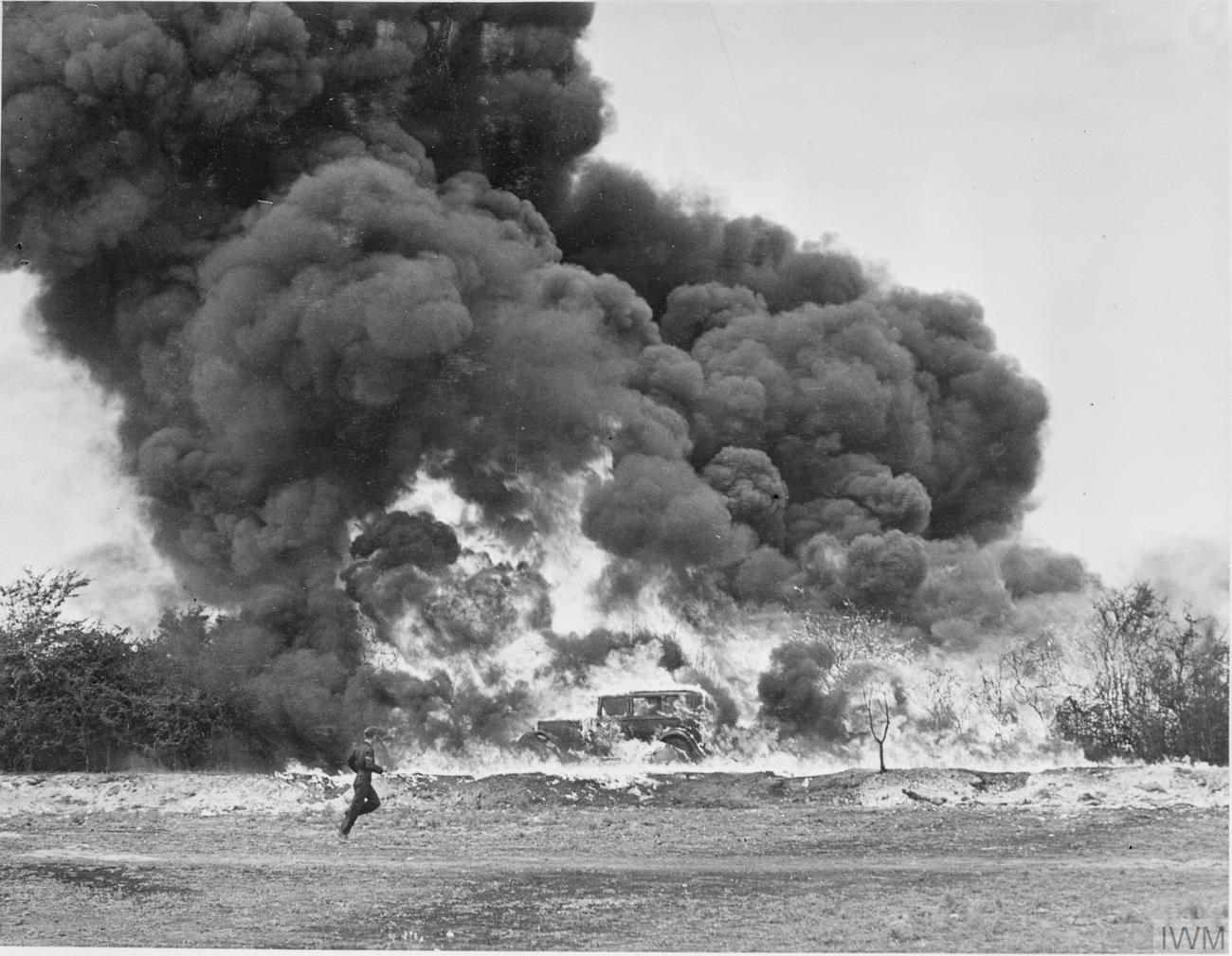
A demonstration of a flame fougasse somewhere in Britain. A car is surrounded in flames and a huge cloud of smoke. c. 1940.

At the outbreak of war, Livens was offered the RAF rank of air commodore. However, he did not enlist, preferring to make his contribution to the war effort as a civilian – in which role he was free to disagree with his seniors.

In 1940, as a German invasion of Britain threatened, the British developed a number of innovative flame warfare weapons. Livens joined the team of developers working at the newly formed Petroleum Warfare Department under the directorship of Sir Donald Banks. Banks described Livens "Colonel Livens was the typical inventor. His equipment as one remembers it was an old club blazer with numerous pockets out of which explosives of all kinds, fuses, wire and gadgets would emerge and hey presto! the most surprising detonation would occur in disconcerting places."

The Petroleum Warfare Department experimented with several proposed systems, including a number suggested by Livens. These included a system resembling his projector to send "flaming comets" onto the landing beaches, but the suggestion with the most promise was the flame fougasse and it was widely adopted.

A flame fougasse comprised a 40-gallon light steel drum (Note: Although the standard capacity is 44 imperial gallons (55 US gallons), historical records generally refer to 40-gallon drums and sometimes 50-gallon drums apparently interchangeably.) filled with petroleum mixture and a small, electrically detonated explosive as a propellant charge. The barrel was dug into the roadside with a substantial overburden and camouflaged. When the Ammonal-based propellant charge was detonated, it caused the barrel to rupture and shoot a flame 10 feet (3 m) wide and 30 yards (30 m) long.

Tens of thousands of flame fougasse barrels were deployed. Almost all were removed before the end of the war, although, incredibly, a few were missed and their remains have lasted to the present day.

The flame fougasse has remained in army field manuals as a battlefield expedient ever since.

== Personal life ==
Livens married Elizabeth Price some time during 1916, and they had three daughters. Livens' wife died on 18 July 1945 after a long illness. On 22 July 1947, Livens later married Arron Perry at St Paul's Church, Winchmore Hill in north London.

In 1924, Livens invented a small dishwasher suitable for use in a domestic setting. It had all the features of a modern dishwasher, including a front door for loading, a wire rack to hold crockery and a rotating sprayer.

In his leisure time, Livens enjoyed sailing small boats and was a member of the Royal Thames Yacht Club. Livens became interested in Spiritualism. He attended a number of séances, including on 15 November 1932 witnessing a séance with the famous medium Rudi Schneider, although in this case it was a null result – nothing happened. Livens was an honorary vice-president of the Spiritualist Association of Great Britain and later he was a great friend of Lord Dowding who had similar interests. Livens was briefly interested in photography, and he patented inventions relating to photography in the 1950s, Livens.

Livens died at a London hospital on 1 February 1964. His remains were cremated at Golders Green Crematorium on Saturday 8 February with the request that donations to Cancer Research should be made in place of flowers. He was survived by his three daughters and left an estate with a value estimated at £82,561 (about £1,462,000 in 2025).

== Medals ==
On 24 July 2018, the auction house Spink announced the sale of his group of five gallantry and campaign medals at the direction of his daughter. The group realised £14,400 including costs.

== Notes and references ==
Footnotes

Bibliography

- Banks, Sir Donald (1946). Flame Over Britain. Sampson Low, Marston and Co.
- Bourne, John (2001). Who's Who in World War One. Routledge. ISBN 978-0-415-14179-6.
- Croddy, Eric (2001). Chemical and Biological Warfare: A Comprehensive Survey for the Concerned Citizen. Springer-Verlag New York. ISBN 978-0-387-95076-1.
- Foulkes, Charles Howard (2001) [First published Blackwood & Sons, 1934]. "Gas!" The Story of the Special Brigade. Published by Naval & Military Press. ISBN 1-84342-088-0.
- Harcup, Guy (2004). "Livens, William Howard". Oxford Dictionary of National Biography (online ed.). Oxford University Press. doi:10.1093/ref:odnb/34560. (Subscription, Wikipedia Library access or UK public library membership required.)
- Jones, Simon (2007). World War I Gas Warfare Tactics and Equipment. Osprey Publishing. ISBN 978-1-84603-151-9.
- Richter, Donald (1992). Chemical Soldiers - British Gas Warfare in World War I. University Press of Kansas. ISBN 0-7006-1113-4.
- Livens Projector M1. United States Department of War. 1942.
- The Use of Gas in the Field. Operations: Military Training Pamphlet No. 23. Part V. War Office. January 1940.
- Barrel Flame Traps, Flame Warfare. Military Training Pamphlet No. 53. Part 1. War Office. July 1942.
- Application For Appointment to a Temporary Commission in the Regular Army For the Period of the War: William Howard Livens. National Archives WO 339/19021. War Office. 1914.
- Minutes of Proceedings before the Royal Commission on Awards to Inventors. National Archives T 173/702. Treasury. 29 May 1922.
- Work of Trench Warfare Section 5 on flame projectors, sprayers, etc. from June 1915 to March 1916. National Archives MUN 5/385. Ministry of Munitions. 29 May 1922.
