= Sapping =

Type of siege operation in warfare

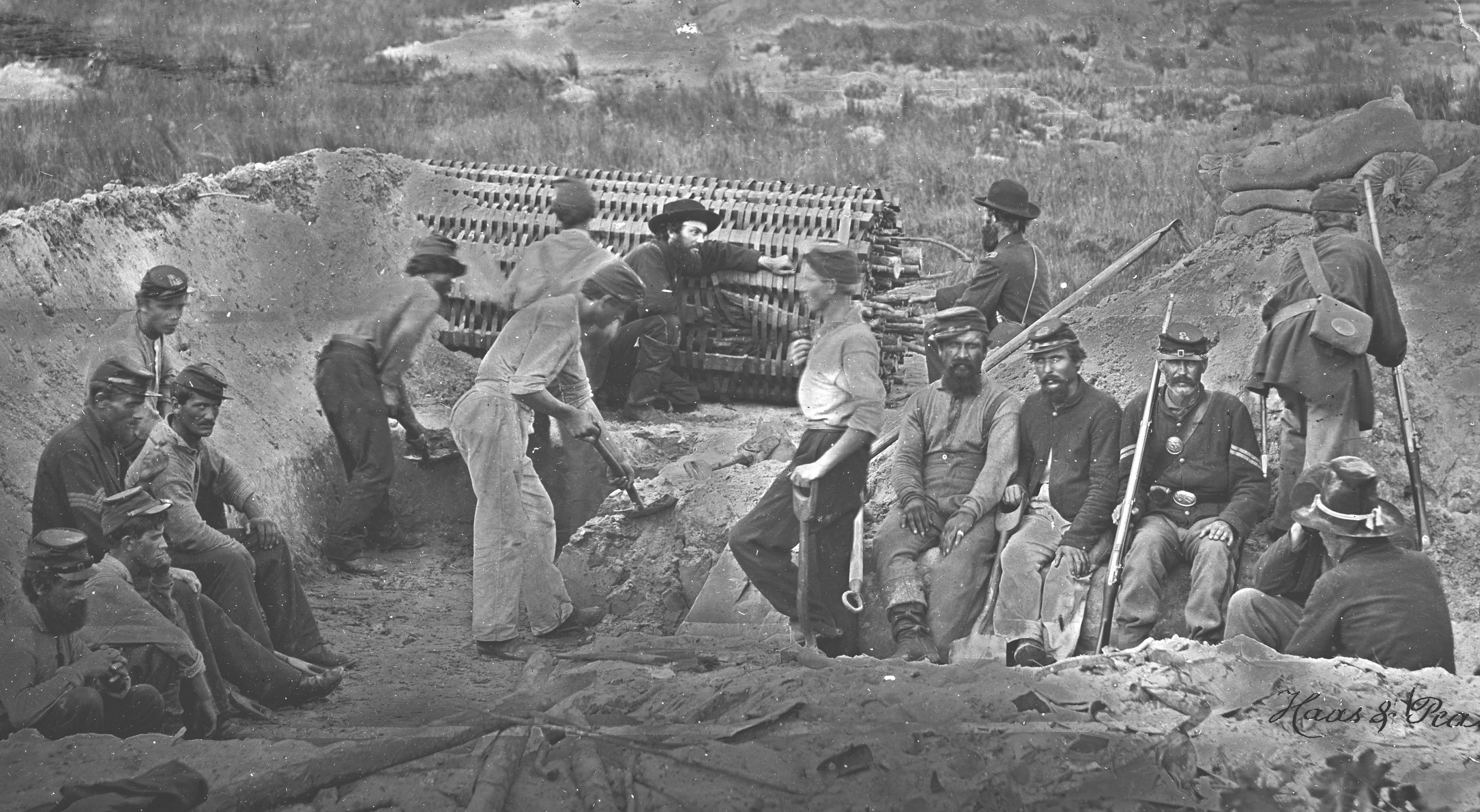
Union troops of the 1st New York Engineers digging a sap with a sap roller on Morris Island, 1863

Sapping is a term used in siege operations to describe the digging of a covered trench (a "sap") to approach a besieged place without danger from the enemy's fire. The purpose of the sap is usually to advance a besieging army's position towards an attacked fortification. It is excavated by specialised military units, whose members are often called sappers.

By using the sap, the besiegers could move closer to the walls of a fortress, without exposing the sappers to direct fire from the defending force. To protect the sappers, trenches were usually dug at an angle in zig-zag pattern (to protect against enfilading fire from the defenders), and at the head of the sap a defensive shield made of gabions (or a mantlet) could be deployed.

Once the saps were close enough, siege engines or cannon could be moved through the trenches to get closer to—and enable firing at—the fortification. The goal of firing is to batter a breach in the curtain walls, to allow attacking infantry to get past the walls. Prior to the invention of large pieces of siege artillery, miners could start to tunnel from the head of a sap to undermine the walls. A fire or gunpowder would then be used to create a crater into which a section of the fortifications would fall, creating a breach.

Before the development of explosives, sapping was the undermining of an enemy's fortifications, which would collapse when the sap's supports were removed. Later, explosives were placed surreptitiously in the undermining sap or mine, then detonated, as was done with 450 tons of high explosive in the First World War battle of Messines, the largest planned explosion until the 1945 Trinity atomic bomb test.

== History ==
=== Pre-gunpowder ===
A way to force entry into a fortified structure was to dig a mine or sap under defensive walls, typically shored up by wooden props. On collapsing the tunnel, for example by burning the props, the wall would collapse.

=== 1500s ===
Sapping trenches, cannons and gunpowder explosives were a potent force against fortifications. However, the Siege of Godesberg of 1583 during the Cologne War showed that fortresses could still withstand sapping and explosives to a point. The attacking force of Ferdinand of Bavaria fired on the Godesburg fortress with large caliber cannons, but this had little impact on the walls. The cannons were firing heavy shot, but the height of the fortress significantly reduced the force of the impact with the walls, which bounced off to little effect, although the fortress dated from the 14th century. To breach the walls, Ferdinand ordered his soldiers to dig into the feldspar supporting the side of the mountain and place an explosive charge. Even after the powder was ignited and a substantial portion of the wall, the gate, and the inner walls were breached, the defenders still held out for three days.

=== Trace Italienne forts ===
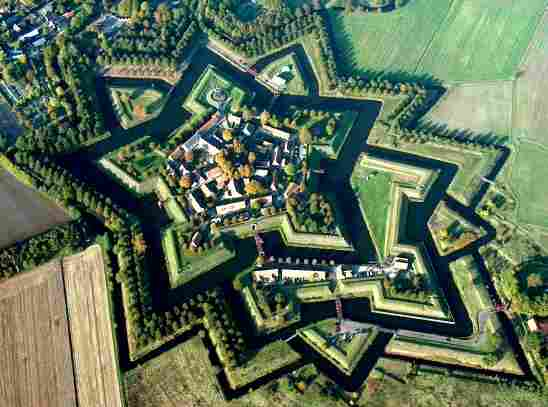
The star-shaped Fort Bourtange, restored to its 1750 condition, is an example of a trace italienne fort.

Sapping became necessary as a response to the development and spread of trace Italienne in defensive architecture in the 1500s. The Italian style star fort bastion made siege warfare and sapping the modus operandi of military operations in the late medieval and first decades of the early modern period of warfare. Fortresses with abutments with gentler angles were difficult to breach; cannonballs and mortar shells often had little impact on the walls, or impact that could be readily repaired after night fell. Towers no longer protruded at right angles from the wall; rather, they blended with the wall. These created a two-fold advantage. First, defenders in the towers had a field of fire of 280 degrees or more. This range of fire and the towers' positioning allowed defenders to fire upon the attackers' flank as they advanced, a deadly fire called enfilade. Consequently, a hostile force which ranged their cannons was less effective, as the "hostile cannon [had] to fire from longer range" and defenders could better enfilade attackers.

=== 1600s ===
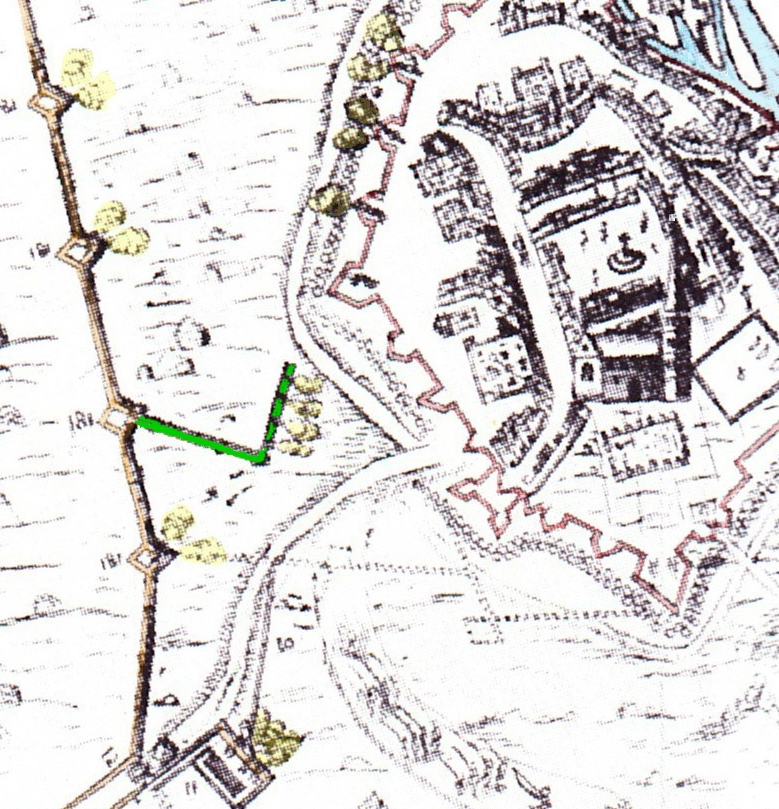
A detail from the Clampe's map of the siege of Newark (6 March 1645 – 8 May 1646) showing in green a sap that allows Roundhead siege artillery to be placed closer to the fortifications of Newark than the circumvallation. Notice that the lines of advance of the zig-zag are at such an angle and position that the defenders were unable to bring enfilade fire to bear.

During the English Civil War, there was a siege of Newark-on-Trent which took place from 6 March 1645 – 8 May 1646. A detailed map of the Cavaliers defences of Newark and the lines of circumvallation and contravallation along with the besiegers redoubts and fortified camps was drawn up by R Clampe, the besieging Roundheads' chief engineer. It includes a zig-zag sap emerging from a bastion of the circumvallation. The zig-zags are at such angles and positions that the defenders were unable to bring enfilade fire to bear. Once the sap was completed four cannons were placed much closer to a gateway than those in bastions of the circumvallation.

=== American Civil War ===
In the American Civil War, troops advanced their sap under cover of a sap roller or mantlet by forming a parapet on the engaged side of the trench one gabion at a time and filling it with earth taken from the trench.

=== First World War ===
During First World War trench warfare, the combatant's sappers, who were often experienced civilian miners who had been rejected for combat duties due to age or ill-health, strived to undermine each other's positions, working silently to avoid detection. After completing a mine it was filled with explosives, sometimes hundreds of tons, and detonated, followed by an attack on the surprised survivors from the destroyed position.

==== Russian sap ====
A Russian sap is a tunnel dug at a shallow depth under no man's land towards an enemy position. It allows the attacking infantry to approach an enemy position without being detected and safe from enemy fire. For the attack, the tunnel is opened and the infantry attacks the enemy position at comparatively short range. Russian saps were widely used in the First World War, for example during the Battle of the Somme, when four of them were further equipped with Livens Large Gallery Flame Projectors. Similar tactics were used in the Korean War by the Chinese People's Volunteer Army, when they dug under the Yalu River to attack US troops, and by Hamas, when carrying out tunnel warfare from the Gaza Strip against Israel.

== See also ==
- Mining (military)
