= Charles Foulkes (British Army officer) =

British Army officer

Major-General Charles Foulkes CB CMG DSO
- Born: 1 February 1875; Bangalore, India
- Died: 6 May 1969 (aged 94); Hampshire, England
- Military career
- Allegiance: United Kingdom
- Branch: British Army
- Service years: 1894–1930
- Rank: Major-General
- Service number: 20501
- Commands: Ordnance Survey of Scotland; 31st (Fortress) Company 'L' Company; 11th (Field) Company
- Conflicts: World War I
- Field hockey career
- Sport: Field hockey
- Position: Defender
Senior career
Years	Team	Caps	Goals
1908–1909	Carlton	-	-
National team
Years	Team	Caps	Goals
–	Scotland		-
Medal record
Men's field hockey
Representing Great Britain
Bronze medal – third place	1908 London	Team competition

Major-General Charles Howard Foulkes, CB, CMG, DSO (1 February 1875 – 6 May 1969) was a Royal Engineers officer in the British Army and also a British international field hockey player who competed in the 1908 Summer Olympics in the bronze medal-winning team. He saw service in World War I and, following the first German use of gas on 22 April 1915 at the Second Battle of Ypres, became Britain's chief advisor on gas warfare. He also advised on the use of gas to suppress the uprisings in Afghanistan (1919) and Waziristan (1920), but gas was never actually deployed in these conflicts.

== Military career ==
Foulkes was educated at Bedford Modern School, and was commissioned into the Royal Engineers as a second lieutenant on 27 February 1894, followed by promotion to lieutenant on 27 February 1897. He served in Sierra Leone 1898–99 (later known as the Hut Tax War), for which he received the East and West Africa Medal. After the outbreak of the Second Boer War in October 1899, he was appointed on the Staff of the army in South Africa, and took part in a number of engagements and operations. He became Assistant Commissioner for the Anglo-French Boundary Commission in the East of Niger in late 1902, with the local rank of captain. After taking part in the Kano-Sokoto expedition which brought the Emirs in Nigeria under British control in 1903, he became Commander of the Ordnance Survey of Scotland in 1904. He was a member of the bronze medal-winning team for the field hockey in the 1908 Summer Olympics. He went on to be Commander of 31st (Fortress) Company in Ceylon in 1909 and Commander of 'L' Company at the Royal Engineers Depot in Chatham in 1913.

Foulkes served in World War I as Commander of 11th (Field) Company, taking part in the First Battle of Ypres in 1914 before becoming Britain's chief advisor on gas warfare in 1915 and General Officer Commanding the Special Brigade responsible for Chemical Warfare and Director of Gas Services in June 1917, for which he was promoted to the temporary rank of brigadier general, taking over from Henry Fleetwood Thuillier.

He advised on the use of gas to suppress the uprisings in Afghanistan in 1919 and Waziristan in 1920, although gas was never actually deployed in these conflicts, before becoming Commander Royal Engineers in Fermoy and Director of Irish Propaganda in 1921. He went on to be Commander, Royal Engineers in Northumbria in 1922, Deputy Chief Engineer at Southern Command in 1924 and Chief Engineer at Aldershot Command in 1926 before retiring in 1930. In June 1928 he was appointed a personal aide-de-camp to King George V.

== Publications ==
- Foulkes, Charles Howard (2001) [First published Blackwood & Sons, 1934]. "Gas!" The Story of the Special Brigade. Published by Naval & Military Press. ISBN 1-84342-088-0.
- Foulkes, C.H., Commonsense and ARP, a practical guide for householders and business managers (C Arthur Pearson, London, 1939)
