= Livens Large Gallery Flame Projector =

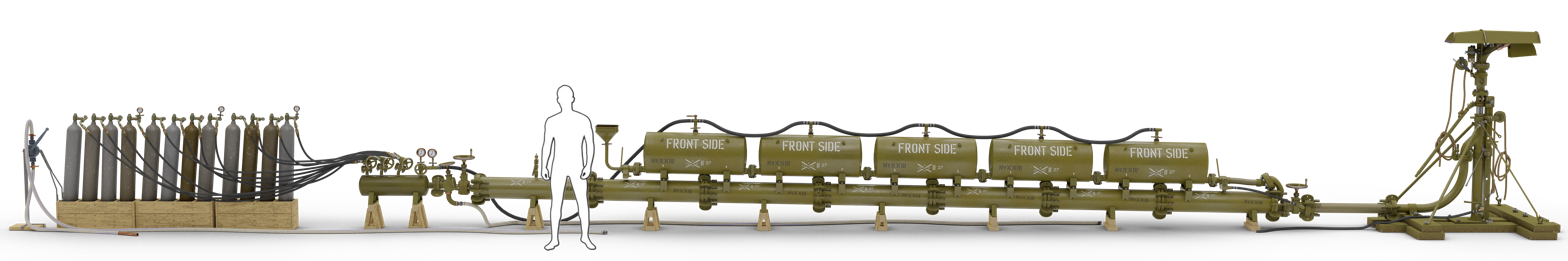
- Type: Flamethrower
- Place of origin: United Kingdom

Service history
- In service: 1916–1917
- Used by: British Army
- Wars: First World War

Production history
- Designer: William Howard Livens
- Produced: 1915–1916 (?)
- No. built: at least 5 (?)

Specifications
- Mass: 2.5 long tons (2.5 t)
- Length: 56 feet (17 m)

Livens Large Gallery Flame Projectors were large experimental flamethrowers used by the British Army in World War I, named after their inventor, Royal Engineers officer William Howard Livens.

== History ==
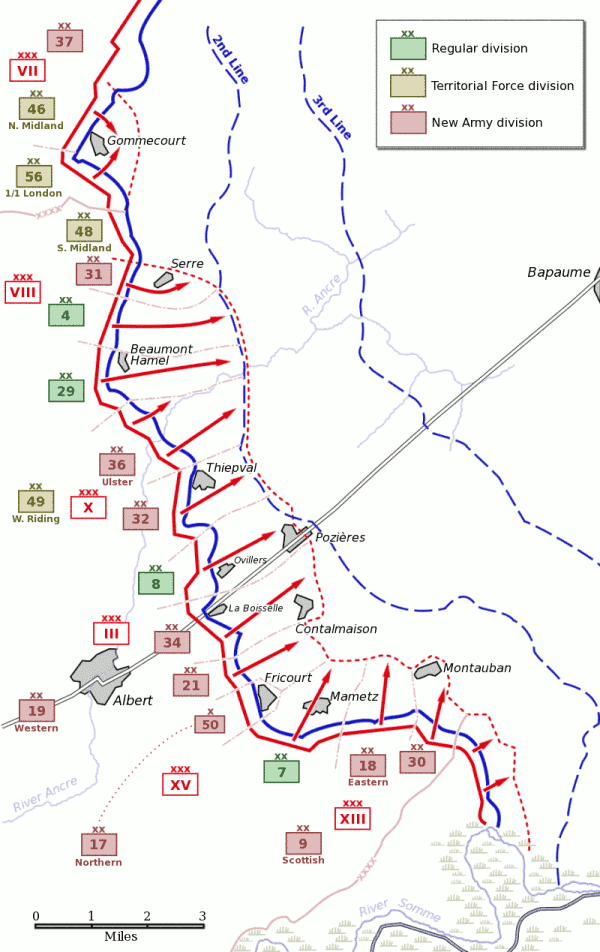
British objectives for 1 July 1916 with front sector allocated to XV Corps

Four Livens Large Gallery Flame Projectors were deployed in 1916 in the Battle of the Somme and one in 1917 in an offensive near Diksmuide, Belgium. As part of the British preparations for the Battle of the Somme, 183rd Tunnelling Company from February 1916 onwards dug dozens of Russian saps for the attack in the front sector allocated to XV Corps. Small charges could be blown from the end of these tunnels and they could then be used to reinforce the captured positions. Four saps were equipped with Livens Large Gallery Flame Projectors, ready to cover the German front line with liquid fire. In order to protect them from enemy fire, the flame throwers were hauled into the saps just hours before the battle. Two tunnels which housed such weapons – located at Kiel Trench south-west of Mametz, and between Carnoy and Kasino Point – were damaged by German shellfire before the attack. The two remaining were put to use from saps immediately left of the mine crater field at Carnoy. Their use may have helped the British in those sectors of the front as British losses there were comparatively low. According to one report fifty German soldiers immediately surrendered after use of the Livens Flame Projector.

The weapon was used in Belgium in 1917, but was found too cumbersome to use, requiring bringing to the front line and assembly by 300 men, dangerously loading it with flammable fuel, and then being able to fire only three bursts before emptying. It was also vulnerable to being damaged or buried by shellfire. Its use was abandoned.

== Specifications ==
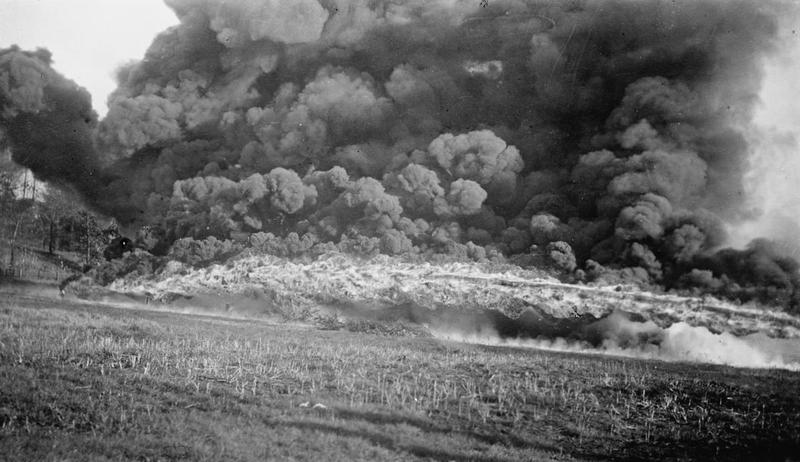
Flame jet shot from a Livens Large Gallery Flame Projector

A Livens Large Gallery Flame Projector was 56 feet (17 m) long, weighed 2.5 long tons (2.5 t), and took a carrying party of 300 men to bring it to the front line and to assemble it underground in a shallow tunnel (sap) dug under no man's land for that purpose. The weapon consisted of several tanks containing the fuel, a 14-inch (360 mm) diameter pipe and a nozzle on the surface. The nozzle, along with the rest of the machine, was hidden underground until needed, stored in a chamber at the end of the sap. A Livens Large Gallery Flame Projector was usually operated by a crew of eight. For the attack, the nozzle would be pushed upwards through the earth by a pneumatic cylinder. Compressed gas would then drive a piston forward in the main body of the device, forcing fuel out of the underground tanks into the surface nozzle, to be ignited and directed at the target. The maximum range of the weapon was 300 ft (90 m). It could be fired for only three ten-second bursts.

== Archaeology ==
Historians Peter Barton and Jeremy Banning with archaeologists Tony Pollard and Iain Banks from the Centre for Battlefield Archaeology at the University of Glasgow were successful in May 2010 in finding at Mametz the remains of one of the Livens Large Gallery Flame Projectors. This project was undertaken for Special episode 42 of the archaeological television programme Time Team first broadcast on 14 April 2011. A full size, working model of the weapon was constructed with support from the Royal Engineers to prove its efficacy.

== Popular culture ==
The Livens flame projector was the inspiration for the cinematographic representation for the fire-breathing of the Smaug principal antagonist character, a "fire breathing drake [dragon]" from the north, in J. R. R. Tolkien's story The Hobbit, as presented by Peter Jackson in The Hobbit: The Desolation of Smaug (the second part of his film trilogy based on the book).
