= Department of Propaganda in Enemy Countries =

British propaganda and communications agency during WW2

- Crewe House; Electra House

Agency overview
- Preceding agency: War Propaganda Bureau
- Superseding agencies: Political Warfare Executive; Political Intelligence Department
- Headquarters: Crewe House; Electra House; Woburn Abbey
- Ministers responsible: David Lloyd George, Prime Minister; Neville Chamberlain, Prime Minister; Winston Churchill, Prime Minister; Lord MacMillan, Minister of Information
- Agency executives: Viscount Northcliffe, Director of Crewe House; Campbell Stuart, Director of Electra House; Reginald Leeper, Director of Electra House
- Parent agency: Ministry of Information (1918); Foreign Office (After German Rearmament); Special Operations Executive (After 1940)

The Department of Propaganda in Enemy Countries was a wartime propaganda, psychological warfare, and communications department of the British Foreign Office and the Ministry of Information. It was active during both World Wars, being originally established in February 1918, during the First World War. During that war, the department was known more commonly as Crewe House, eponymously named after the building in which it was established. It was directed by Viscount Northcliffe, and maintained as its leaders high persons of British society, such as H. G. Wells and Hamilton Fyfe.

During the Second World War, the department became known as Electra House, Department Electra House, Department EH, or simply EH. The director of the department for the duration of the Second World War was Campbell Stuart. As such, the department was sometimes referred to as CS. Electra House was the eponymously derived name from the Electra House buildings at No. 84 Moorgate, and on the Victoria Embankment at No. 4 Temple Place. The department's London headquarters were at the Moorgate building, but the building on the Victoria Embankment served as expanded offices and as an emergency site for relocation should the first building be bombed. Both of the Electra House buildings were bombed. As a result of the bombings, the department's Country Headquarters (CHQ) were expanded to Woburn Abbey.

Regarding the nature of propaganda, Campbell Stuart wrote:

"What is propaganda? It is the presentation of a case in such a way that others may be influenced. In so far as its use against an enemy is concerned, the subject matter employed must not be self-evidently propagandist. Except in special circumstances, its origin should be completely concealed. As a general rule, too, it is desirable to hide the channels of communication."

In 1940, Electra House was merged with the Section for Destruction of the Secret Intelligence Service, and another department in the War Office called Military Intelligence (Research), to form the Special Operations Executive (SOE).

== Origins ==
In Britain, two key bodies were formed to manage information during the First World War. One was the News Department created by the Foreign Office to handle the growing demand for war updates from journalists from allied and neutral nations based in London. The other was the Neutral Press Committee (NPC), which operated under the Home Office and was linked to the Press Bureau, the main government office for wartime censorship.

At the outset of conflict in World War I, a covert propaganda agency was established called the War Propaganda Bureau, led by Charles Masterman. More commonly, it was referred to as Wellington House. Wellington House's mission was to explain Britain's reasons for joining the war and to defend its wartime strategies to neutral countries and its allied Dominions, such as Canada, South Africa, Australia, and New Zealand. To sway public opinion in neutral nations, especially the United States, Masterman enlisted the help of many prominent authors of the era. This group included famous writers like J.M. Barrie, Arnold Bennett, G.K. Chesterton, Arthur Conan Doyle, John Galsworthy, Thomas Hardy, John Masefield, Gilbert Murray, G.M. Trevelyan, H.G. Wells, and Rudyard Kipling. Through their efforts, the Bureau worked to gain international sympathy and support for the British cause by presenting its case through influential literary voices.

In early 1917, the propaganda functions of Wellington House were integrated into a new, larger body known as the Department of Information (DOI), which was led by the Minister Sir Edward Carson and the author John Buchan. This department was given authority over both foreign propaganda and the majority of domestic information efforts. The following year, the organization was expanded once more to form the Ministry of Information (MOI), an independent department led by Lord Beaverbrook, the newspaper magnate. This new ministry directed nearly all of Britain's official propaganda activities. The main exceptions were the National War Aims Committee, a parliamentary body focused on local domestic propaganda, and the military intelligence section known as MI7.

Wellington House was effectively shut down in 1918, when Charles Masterman was promoted to become the nascent Ministry's Director of Publications. At this point, the Ministry actively searched for someone who could effectively manage the war effort's propaganda productions and distributions.

== Crewe House ==
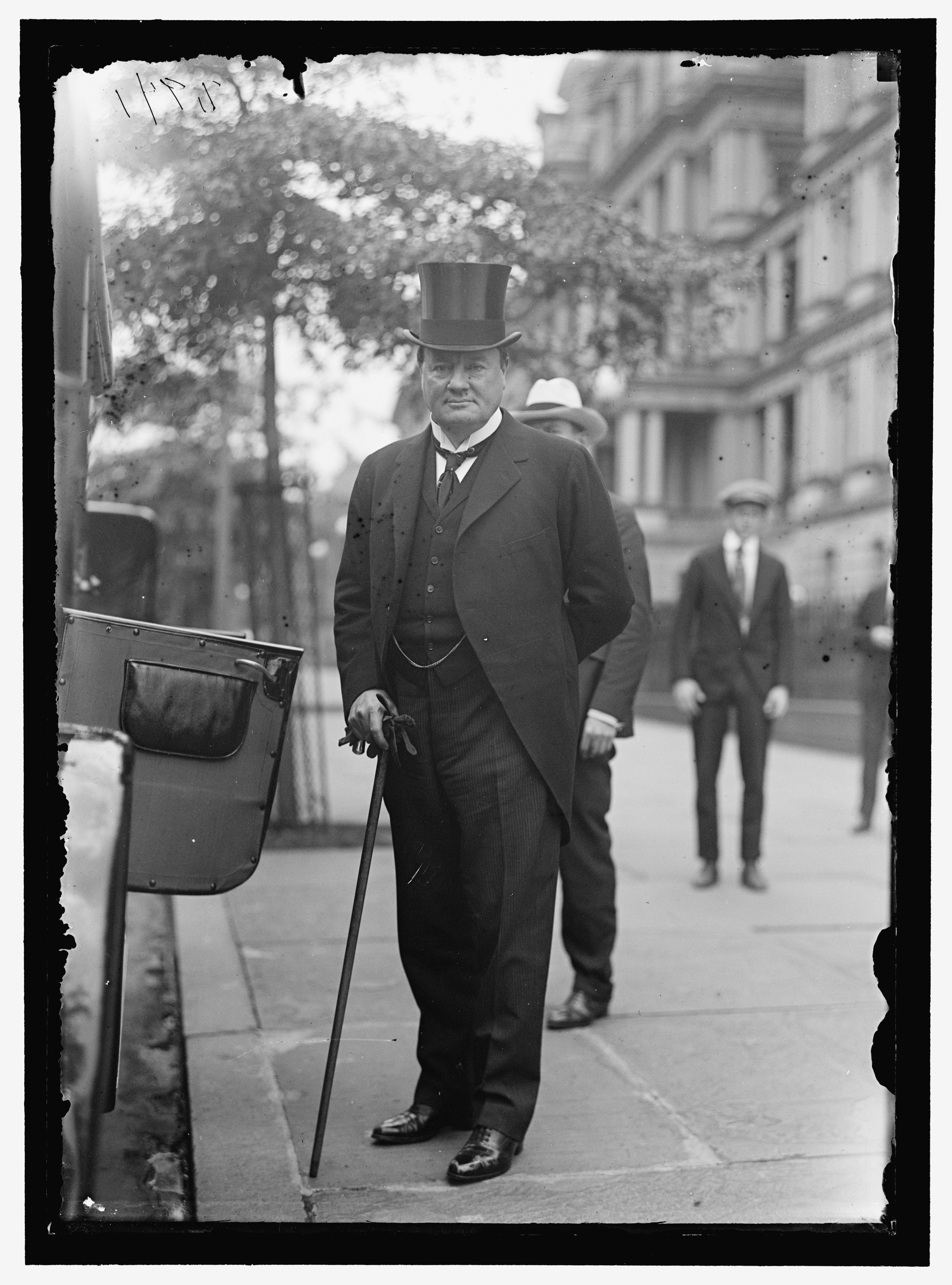
The Viscount Northcliffe was the Director of Crewe House during the late stages of the First World War.

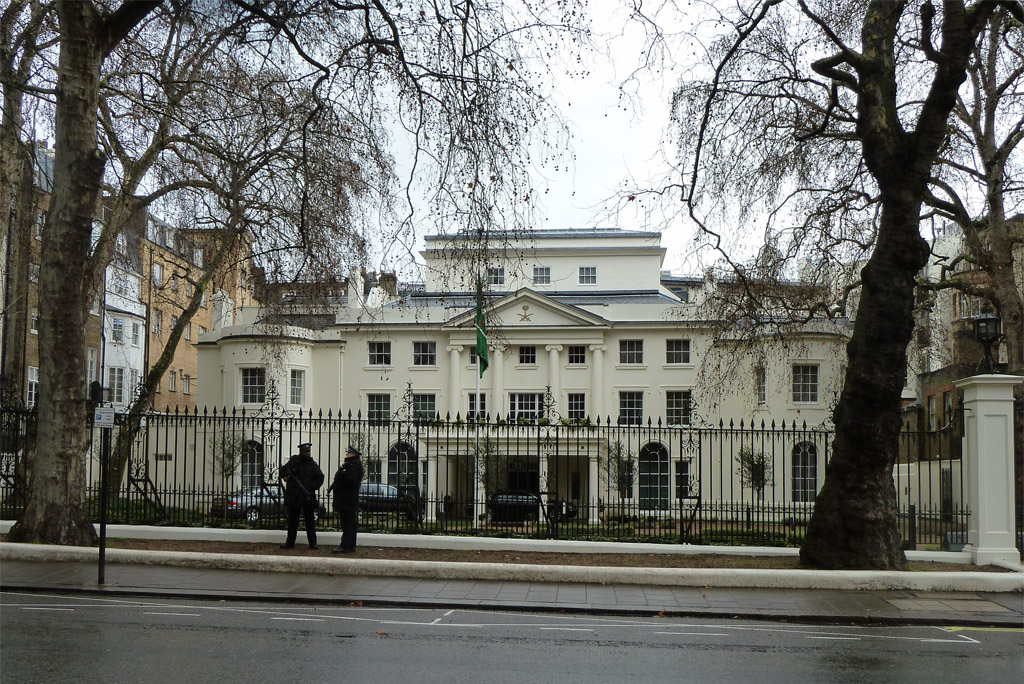
Crewe House, Curzon Street, is today occupied by the Embassy of Saudi Arabia in London.

In February 1918, at the express invitation of Prime Minister David Lloyd George, the Viscount Northcliffe became the first Director of Propaganda in Enemy Countries, a role for which his reputation made him a frequent target of the German press. He established his department at Crewe House, the mansion home of Lord Crewe located on Curzon Street in Westminster. Therefore, the department came to be known eponymously as Crewe House. Northcliffe structured this department with two separate branches; the first responsible for producing propaganda, and the second responsible for its distribution. To guide this specialized work, Northcliffe enlisted an Advisory Committee of distinguished journalists and publicists.

The Advisory Committee comprised:

- Rudolph Feilding, 9th Earl of Denbigh
- Robert Donald
- Sir Roderick Jones
- Sir Sidney Low
- Sir Charles Nicholson
- James O'Grady
- H. Wickham Steed
- H. G. Wells

The Austro-Hungarian section was led by H. Wickham Steed and Dr. Seton-Watson, who worked directly with oppressed nationalities within the Empire to undermine its stability. The German section was initially headed by the author H.G. Wells, who produced a key study on propaganda strategy before being succeeded by Hamilton Fyfe for the final, intensive phase of the war. Delivering this material was a complex task; while military authorities distributed leaflets to enemy troops, a civilian unit built networks to smuggle propaganda into enemy countries through neutral nations.

=== Austria-Hungary Section ===
Crewe House identified Austria-Hungary as the enemy most vulnerable to psychological warfare. The strategy, developed by Viscount Northcliffe with Wickham Steed and Seton-Watson, had two main goals: to support the independence aspirations of the Empire's oppressed nationalities (like the Czechs and Southern Slavs) and to encourage their disinclination to fight for the Central Powers.

A major obstacle was the secret Treaty of London, which had promised Austrian territories inhabited by Southern Slavs to Italy, undermining Allied credibility. To counter this, a campaign was launched to foster a unified front among these nationalities. This culminated in the Congress of Oppressed Nationalities in Rome, which publicly aligned their cause with the Allies.

An Inter-Allied Propaganda Commission was established on the Italian front, producing millions of leaflets, newspapers, and even using gramophone records to target Austro-Hungarian troops. Crewe House later presented their efforts as directly responsible for widespread desertion and unrest within the Austrian army, which significantly delayed a major offensive and contributed to its ultimate failure.

=== German Section ===
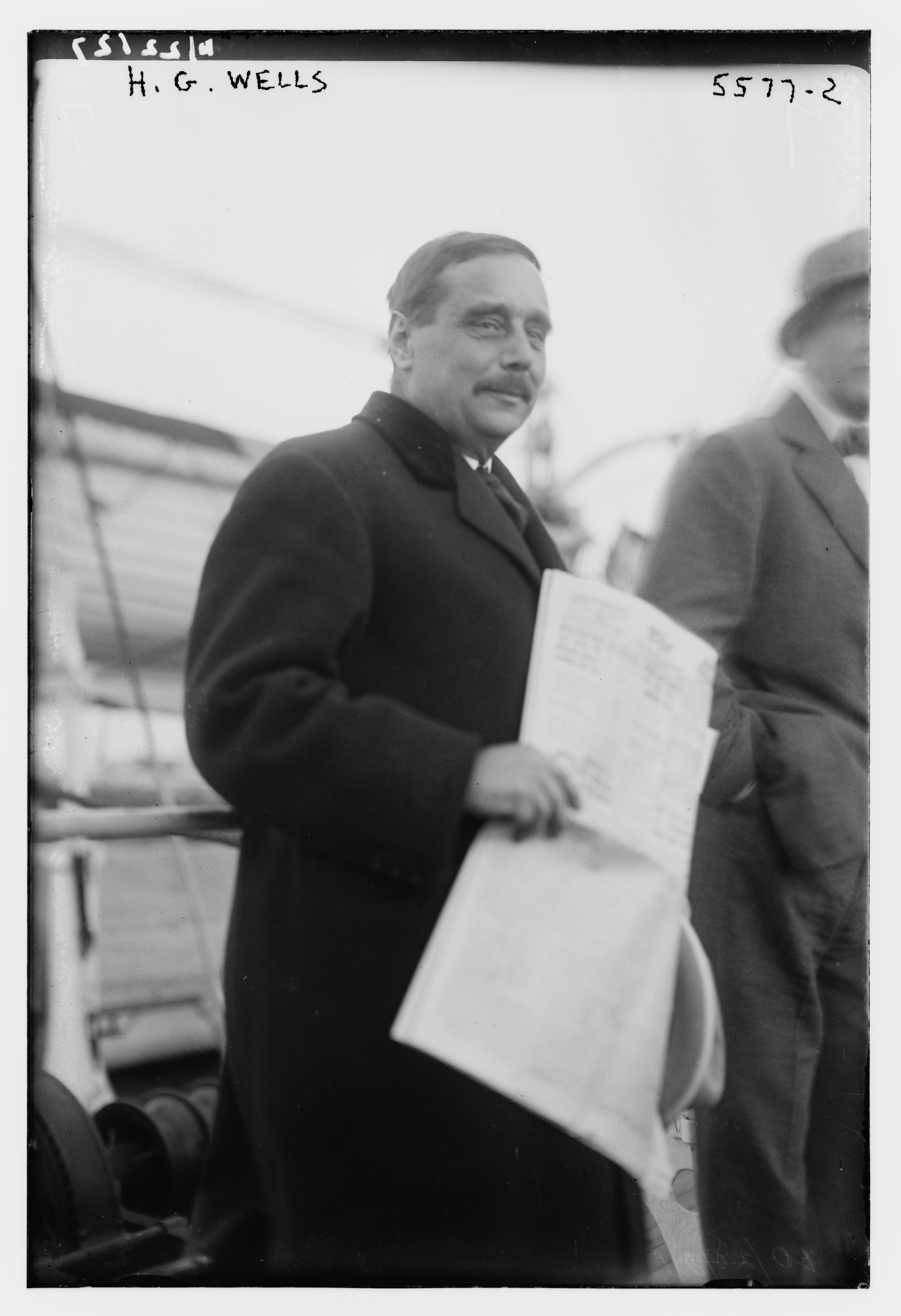
H.G. Wells was the first Chief of the German Section.

British propaganda against Germany began slowly, initially viewed with skepticism by military leadership. Early efforts were limited, but a dedicated branch within the War Office's Military Intelligence Directorate was eventually established. This group began producing leaflets for German troops, aiming to counter enemy lies and reveal the truth about the war's progress and Germany's deteriorating home-front conditions. For the German front, he enlisted writer H.G. Wells to define a clear propaganda policy. Wells's key memorandum argued that the Allied aim was not to crush Germany, but to establish a "League of Free Nations." The propaganda was to convince Germans that only by overthrowing their militarist government could they avoid ruin and eventually join this peaceful world order. Hamilton Fyfe later succeeded Wells and continued this work.

A major challenge was distribution. After Germany threatened to punish captured airmen, Britain stopped using planes and instead developed paper balloons to carry leaflets. While innovative, this method was dependent on wind direction. Lord Northcliffe repeatedly lobbied to resume aerial distribution, a request that was only granted in the war's final weeks.

The propaganda effort was intensified and centralized at Crewe House. A system was created to produce "priority" news leaflets that could be in German hands within 48 hours of being written. The volume was immense, with millions of leaflets dropped in the last months of the war. The content focused on Allied military successes, the overwhelming arrival of American forces, and the hopelessness of the German cause. The leaflets were designed to be truthful and verifiable, or white propaganda, which gave them credibility. This "intensive" campaign in the final weeks directly attacked the Hohenzollern government and urged German soldiers to consider why they were still fighting.

=== Victory in Europe and closure of Crewe House ===
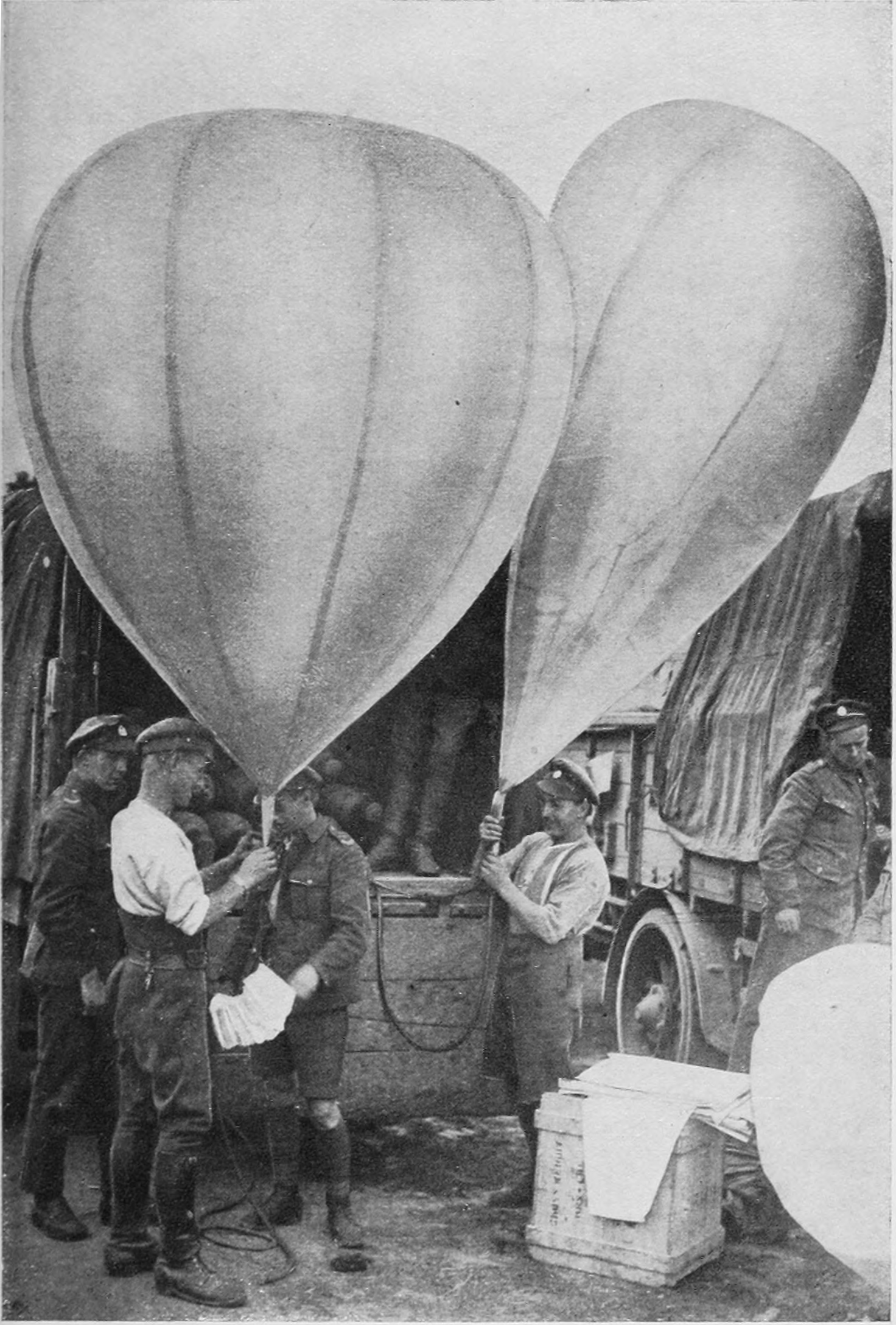
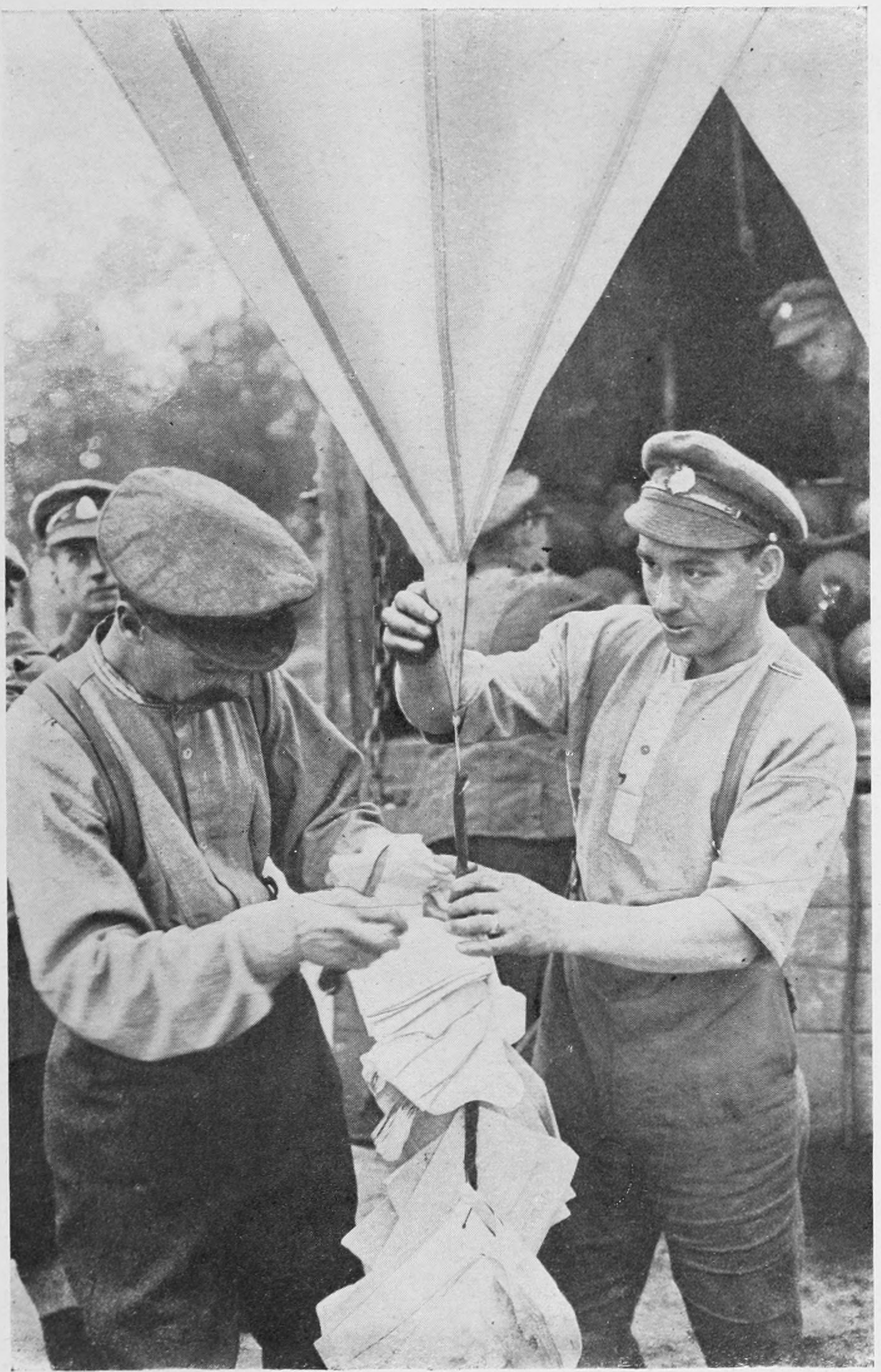
Leaflets were launched throughout Europe attached to balloons.

Crewe House did not operate in isolation but relied on seamless coordination with other government departments. Through a system of liaison officers, it maintained vital links with the Foreign Office, War Office, Admiralty, and the Ministry of Information, which provided crucial resources like its wireless service. This collaboration saw unwavering support and efficiency, with even the Treasury facilitating smooth and prompt funding for all necessary expenditures. Contrary to enemy claims of vast spending, the entire intensive propaganda campaign over its final four months was conducted at a relatively modest cost. The total expenditure, including support from other departments, was £31,360, with only £7,946 spent directly by Crewe House, a figure kept low in part because many staff members worked without remuneration. This efficient and collaborative effort proved to be a remarkably successful and cost-effective component of the Allied war strategy.

However, some historians challenge the extent of this department's influence. One prominent view is that the idea that Northcliffe's propaganda directly caused the collapse of German home-front morale – a notion later exploited by German propagandists as a stab-in-the-back myth – is not supported by evidence. This perspective argues that the department actually produced very little original political content. Furthermore, even if it had, the significant logistical challenges of distribution meant that few Germans inside the country would have ever seen these leaflets.

According to this analysis, the messages that truly eroded the German will to fight were not covert leaflets, but the public statements and policy positions openly declared by the American President and the British Prime Minister. The department had little time to prove its effectiveness against Germany before the war ended. Northcliffe resigned immediately after the Armistice, and the organization was quickly disbanded, followed by a swift demobilization of Britain's psychological warfare capabilities.

== Electra House ==
=== Interwar Years ===
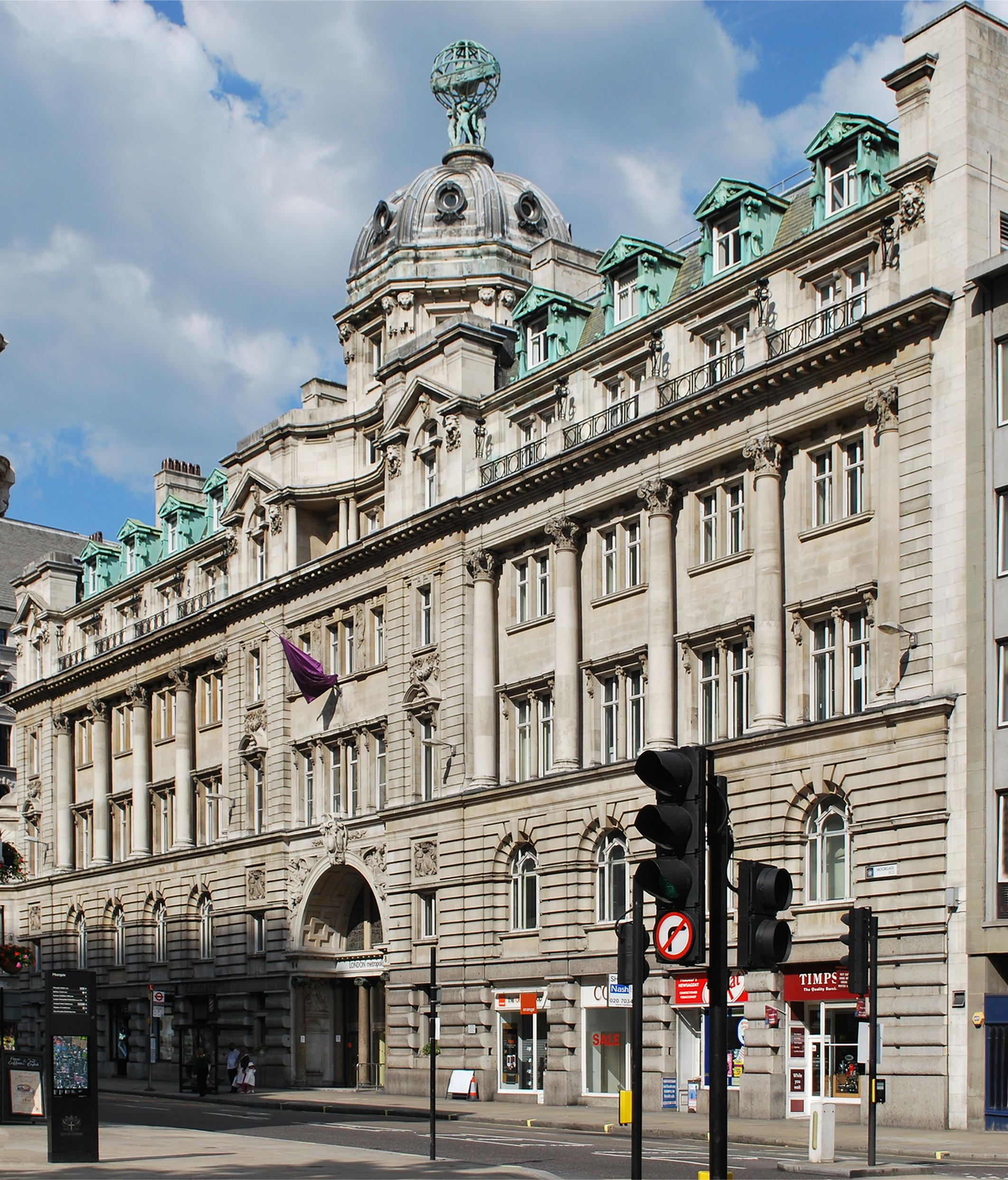
Electra House Moorgate served as the first Headquarters of the department during the Second World War.

Following intelligence reports received of Germany's rearmament, plans to reestablish the Department of Propaganda in Enemy Countries as a small section dedicated to studying propaganda techniques were developed by the Foreign Office under Lord Halifax. Since reliable intelligence on Nazi operations could best be obtained from refugees, one early source was Dr. Klaus Spiecker, a former Weimar civil servant who had fled to France and operated the anti-Nazi radio station Deutsche Freiheitsender near Paris. After being brought to Britain by the Secret Service, he resumed his broadcasts from Woburn under the pseudonym “Mr. Turner.”

At Prime Minister Neville Chamberlain's direction, Sir Campbell Stuart was asked by Sir Warren Fisher to form a similar department in preparation for the coming war. Stuart had many experiences from the First World War with which to draw upon, having served at Crewe House and written its official history. Stuart had also been well versed in printing, production, and paper manufacture from his earlier career at The Times.

With the help of Admiral Sir Roger Backhouse, the First Sea Lord, Stuart secured the appointment of Reginald Alexander Dallas Brooks as his chief staff officer. Brooks was an Australian, and a member of the Royal Marines. During World War I, Brooks fought at Zeebrugge. He had also previously served as an intelligence officer in South Africa. Brooks managed liaison with intelligence agencies, while Colonel R. J. Shaw, a former Times staff member and friend of Stuart, headed the section itself.

To provide for these services, the propaganda department was drawn up and established out of Stuart's offices at Electra House Moorgate. In the lead-up to the Munich Agreement of 1938, a batch of leaflets was produced for an aerial distribution campaign over Germany. While the leaflets were never actually dropped, the planning stage highlighted a need for better coordination. This prompted Electra House to send a formal communication to the Air Ministry, stressing the importance of establishing a properly organized system for delivering information to enemy nations. The official at the Air Ministry who received this note was Sir Donald Banks, who would later be appointed as the head of the Petroleum Warfare Department (PWD).

The results of Munich Agreement of 1938 led to the postponement of these preparations, a decision later seen as a major setback to internal German opposition against Hitler. Chamberlain at this point was under the assumption that peace had been declared, and there would be no need for any more subversive sections. The plans for this department were mainly shelved at this point, and Campbell anticipated that the department would shut down.

=== World War II ===
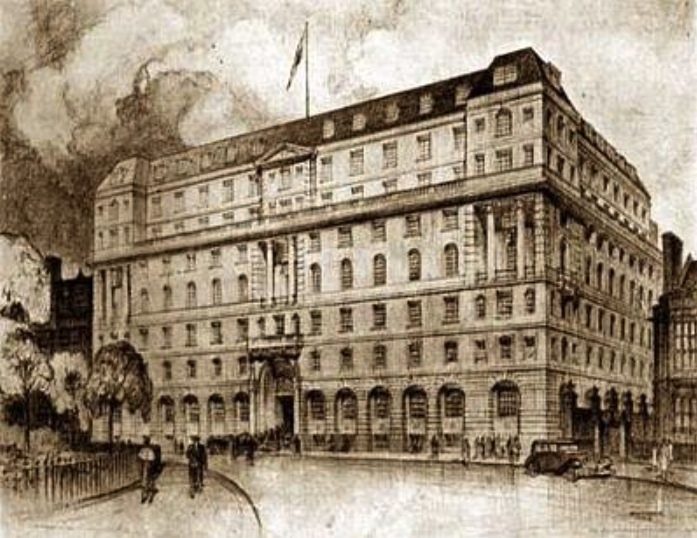
Electra House Victoria, Room 207, was linked via underground telegraphy directly to Electra House Moorgate. From here, Electra House monitored the communications of all Foreign Embassies in London.

Only several months later, following the Occupation of Czechoslovakia in March 1939, war again appeared inevitable, and Stuart was instructed to revive his propaganda organisation. Officially titled the Department of Propaganda in Enemy Countries, it operated under the newly minted Minister of Information, Lord MacMillan, and was funded through the Foreign Office's Secret Vote, though the department was required to operate entirely outside its premises. The office was relocated to Electra House Victoria, the 2nd headquarters of Cable and Wireless, of which Campbell Stuart was also the chairman. The department operated out of Room 207 of this building, equipped with a Reuters news tape and a wireless set.

In April 1939, Stuart established three guiding principles for British propaganda: it must be truthful, consistent, and aligned with clear policy. Anglo-French cooperation was pursued through the Anglo-French Propaganda Council in Paris. Stuart, however, found his French counterparts “suspicious and superior,” and instead secured practical assistance through his French-Canadian relatives, notably his cousins in the Beaulieu banking family of Montreal, who maintained a banking house in Paris.

Campbell Stuart recruited the author Valentine Williams, a former colleague from the Daily Mail, who in turn secured the involvement of Noël Coward for the department's Paris office. During the Phoney War, Stuart, accompanied by his private secretary Anthony Gishford and Reginald Dallas Brooks, made several official visits to Paris.

The Foreign Office drafted six versions of leaflets, from which Sir Alexander Cadogan selected one for translation into German and mass printing, ten million copies at the cost of sixpence per hundred, by H.M. Stationery Office. Despite mutual reservations, the British and French collaborated in the production and distribution of the leaflets to be carried by balloon into enemy territory. The French were unimpressed by the British contributions, criticizing the leaflets for grammatical errors and incorrect word usage.

=== Country Headquarters at Woburn Abbey ===
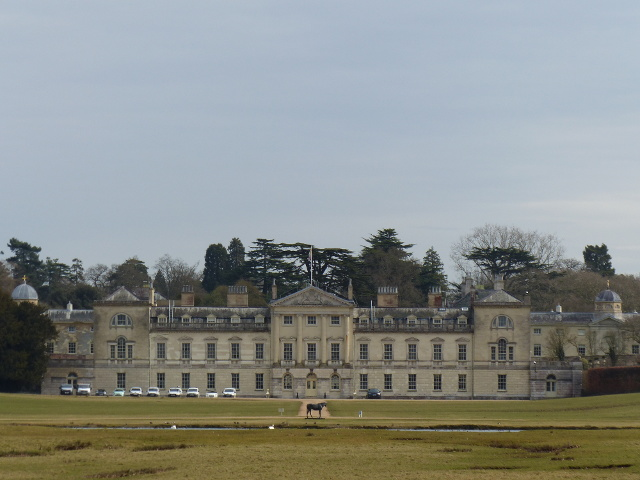
At the invitation of the Duke of Bedford, Woburn Abbey became the Country Headquarters for Electra House in late 1938, while they maintained their City Headquarters at Electra House.

As the threat of war grew and London appeared a likely target, the department prepared to relocate its operations to safer quarters. On the suggestion of the Hon. Leo Russell, advertising director of Illustrated Newspapers and a kinsman of the Duke of Bedford, Woburn Abbey was chosen as the new operations base. The Duke readily agreed, preferring to accommodate the propaganda unit rather than wartime evacuees. Campbell Stuart had some prior familiarity with the Woburn area, having spent a summer there as a child in 1892. During that visit, a trip through Woburn Park to see its collection of exotic animals was a memorable event for him. However, Electra House still maintained staffs at both of the Electra Houses for the purposes of monitoring foreign governments through their telegraphy, and Electra House Moorgate was maintained as its headquarters.

Parallel to these developments, the Foreign Office revived its Political Intelligence Department, originally formed during the First World War. Under Reginald “Rex” Leeper, PID recruited Robert Bruce Lockhart to oversee Central Europe and the Balkans. Among those later associated with the propaganda and intelligence coordination was Anthony Eden, who after resigning as Foreign Secretary in 1938 remained closely involved in wartime intelligence, including liaison with Bletchley Park. By the outbreak of the Second World War, Bletchley Park was already active in decoding German communications. The propaganda staff of Electra House, by then based at Woburn Abbey, stood ready for mobilisation, while PID occupied nearby offices. Additional facilities had been prepared for foreign nationals involved in secret broadcasting, positioning the district as a key centre for Britain's early wartime intelligence and propaganda operations.

Campbell Stuart, Anthony Gishford, and Dallas Brooks were in the department's offices in Paris on the day Germany invaded Poland. Determined to return to England to oversee operations, Stuart arranged to conclude the department's affairs in France and reserved passage on the 4 p.m. train. When doubts arose that the train would run, he ordered his staff to find a car. They located a man in the Place de la Concorde and, after confirming that the Woburn Abbey operation had been activated, set out for Boulogne. A punctured tire delayed their journey, and they arrived after the final boat had departed. A hurried telephone call to Dieppe revealed that there would be a night sailing, and the party raced to the port in time to board, reaching England safely and continuing on to Woburn.

As the head of the organization, Campbell Stuart lived with a few key associates in Paris House on the Woburn estate. This visually striking building was a 19th-century reproduction of a 16th-century style, originally built for the Paris Exhibition of 1878, from which it got its name. The house had been purchased by an earlier Duke of Bedford and transported in its entirety to Woburn. Despite its architectural interest, Stuart reportedly found the house inconvenient, poorly lit, and uncomfortably cold in the winter. The rest of the staff were housed in about a dozen other smaller dwellings in or near Woburn.

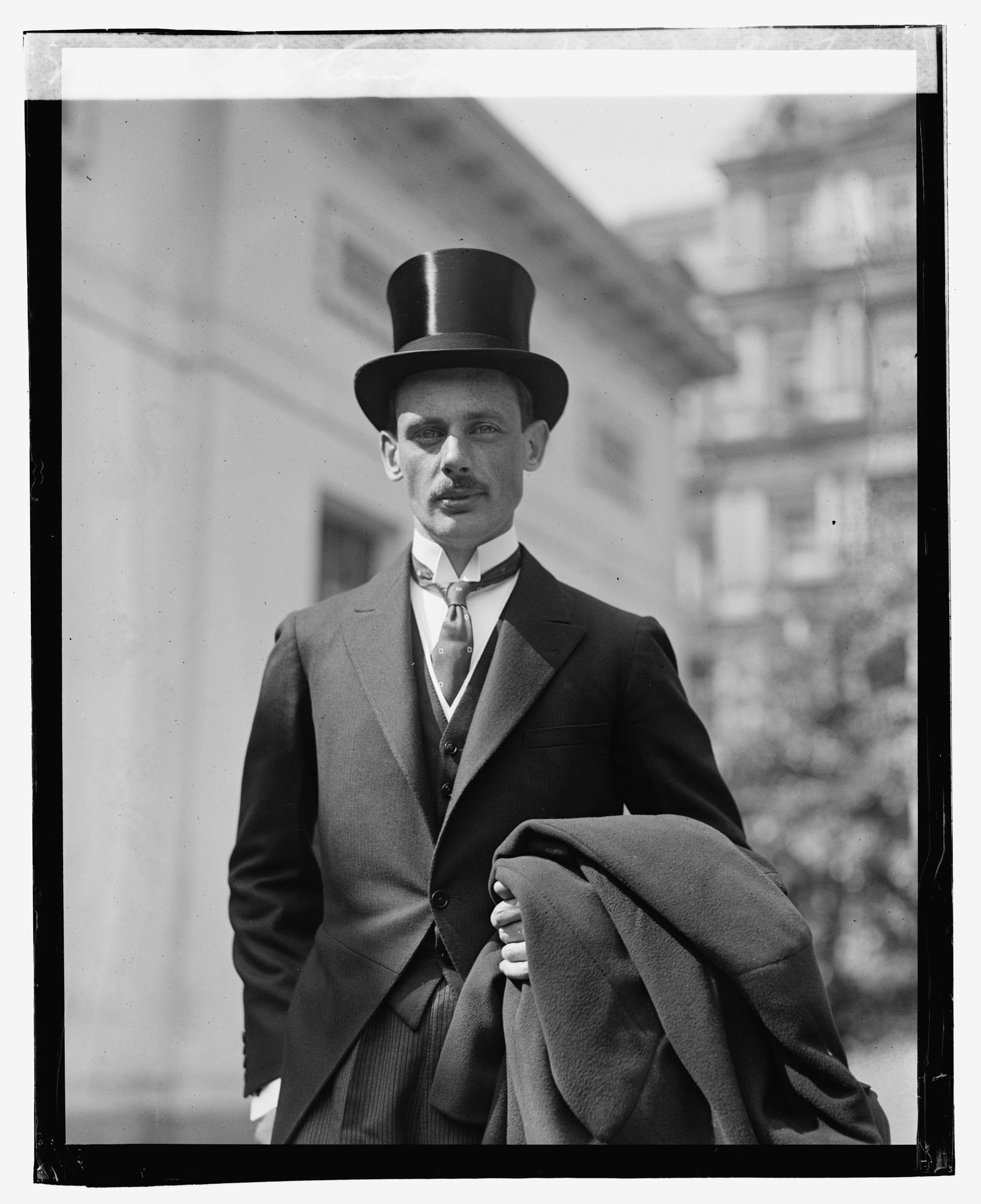
Sir Campbell Stuart was the creator and director of Electra House.

The British headquarters, always called "CHQ" or "Country Headquarters," was established at the estate. Personnel were discreetly directed to a hotel in nearby Dunstable, where they would receive a hand-drawn map or transport to the final, confidential location. Office spaces were created in the stable wing and a large riding school, where a long corridor was flanked by two dozen small partitioned cubicles. Living quarters were set up above the stables. Despite the functional accommodations, the presence of important works of art, left from the building's previous use as an overflow art gallery, lent an air of grandeur to the space.

The Duke of Bedford visited early on to observe the new operations. The staff of sixty was initially catered by the firm J. Lyons and Co., with the canteen bar reportedly accounting for nearly 10% of the department's salary expenditures. This catering contract was later taken over by A.B.C.

From the very first night of the war, British bombers dropped leaflets over Germany, including one titled "A Warning to the German People." This aerial leafleting continued on subsequent nights. In addition to aircraft, balloons were also used as a delivery method, with launches beginning from the French countryside on September 30, 1939.

The most notable was a two-page news sheet designed to mimic a Nazi newspaper, titled Wolkiger Beobachter ("From the Clouds")—a deliberate pun on the authentic Nazi party newspaper, Völkischer Beobachter. It was first dropped on German cities in November 1939.

The production of these leaflets was housed in a small green-and-white hangar on the Woburn estate, previously used to store aircraft. This facility, complete with an adjacent office and workshop, was converted into a composing room where typesetters hired from the Oxford University Press worked. The early leaflets were manually typeset using traditional German Fraktur typeface/font and then sent to the government's printing office for mass production.

Stuart desired that his department only publish white propaganda at Woburn, and disliked greatly the printing of black propaganda, which he thought was probably much more suited to other departments. That other department which printed black propaganda out of Woburn Abbey was Section D of the SIS. Stuart eventually requested the members of Section D to transfer away, when they were stationed at a house in Hertingfordbury, but some Section D members remained at Woburn Abbey to assist in the production of white propaganda.

=== Intensified printing operations at Marylands estate ===
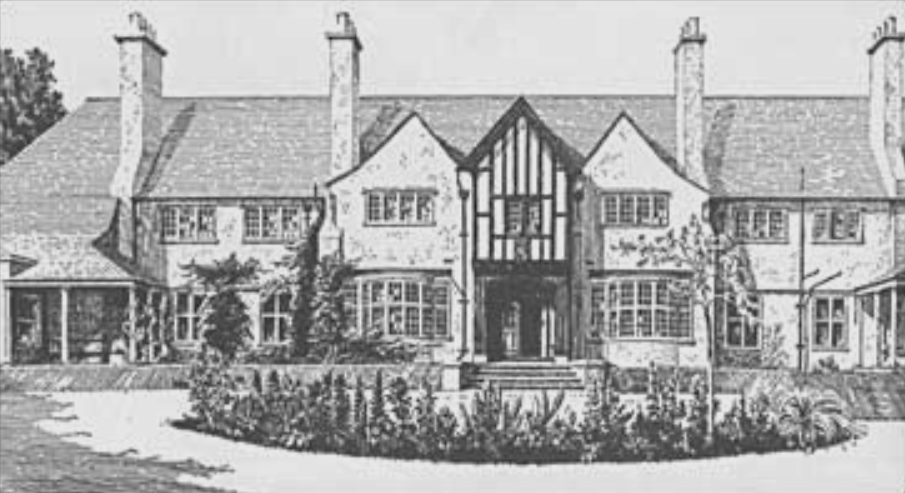
Marylands was built for the Duchess of Bedford in 1903. In the 1940s, it was absorbed into the operations of Electra House and the PID.

Following the German occupation of Western Europe and Italy's entry into the war, the demand for British propaganda surged. To meet this need, the Woburn printing unit was moved to a larger facility nearby at Marylands. There, with new typesetting equipment installed, the expanded staff worked around the clock, primarily on overt white propaganda.

The recruitment of skilled typographers and graphic artists led to a major improvement in the quality of the propaganda materials. Printing was handled by specialist firms, including the Sun Engraving Co. in Watford and Waterlows in Dunstable, the latter being experts in photogravure. This partnership allowed for the effective use of color and the high-quality reproduction of photographs. Another key contributor from the start of the war was Home Counties Newspapers, a Luton-based printing group that used its presses in Luton and Leagrave to produce a substantial volume of material.

Production was a continuous process, and print blocks were collected daily by car from Woburn Abbey. The demanding schedule yielded impressive results and soon led to a new project: a weekly "white" propaganda publication for distribution over France called the Courrier de L'Air (sharing the name of an earlier World War I newspaper printed by Crewe House). This French-language publication was printed elsewhere using gravure, while the Luton News, part of the Home Counties Group, was awarded the typesetting contract. The text was set at four times the normal size in the evenings, and the proofs were then photographically reduced. Eventually, the operation expanded to typesetting papers in five different languages, requiring two evening shifts to manage the workload.

The printing unit also handled specialized, one-off projects. The defection of Rudolf Hess in May 1941 presented such an opportunity. Under conditions of extreme secrecy, the team at Luton News produced forged copies of the German newspaper Völkischer Beobachter with altered pages, which were then deliberately planted for Hess to read.

Alongside printed propaganda, the British effort expanded into "black" radio propaganda, which was distinct from the official "white" broadcasts of the BBC. To lead this initiative, they enlisted the services of 48-year-old Colonel (later Brigadier) Richard Gambier-Parry. His mission was to establish and enhance radio communications for the Secret Intelligence Service (SIS), which included providing the necessary transmitters for these clandestine broadcasts.

=== Whaddon Hall and radio broadcasting ===
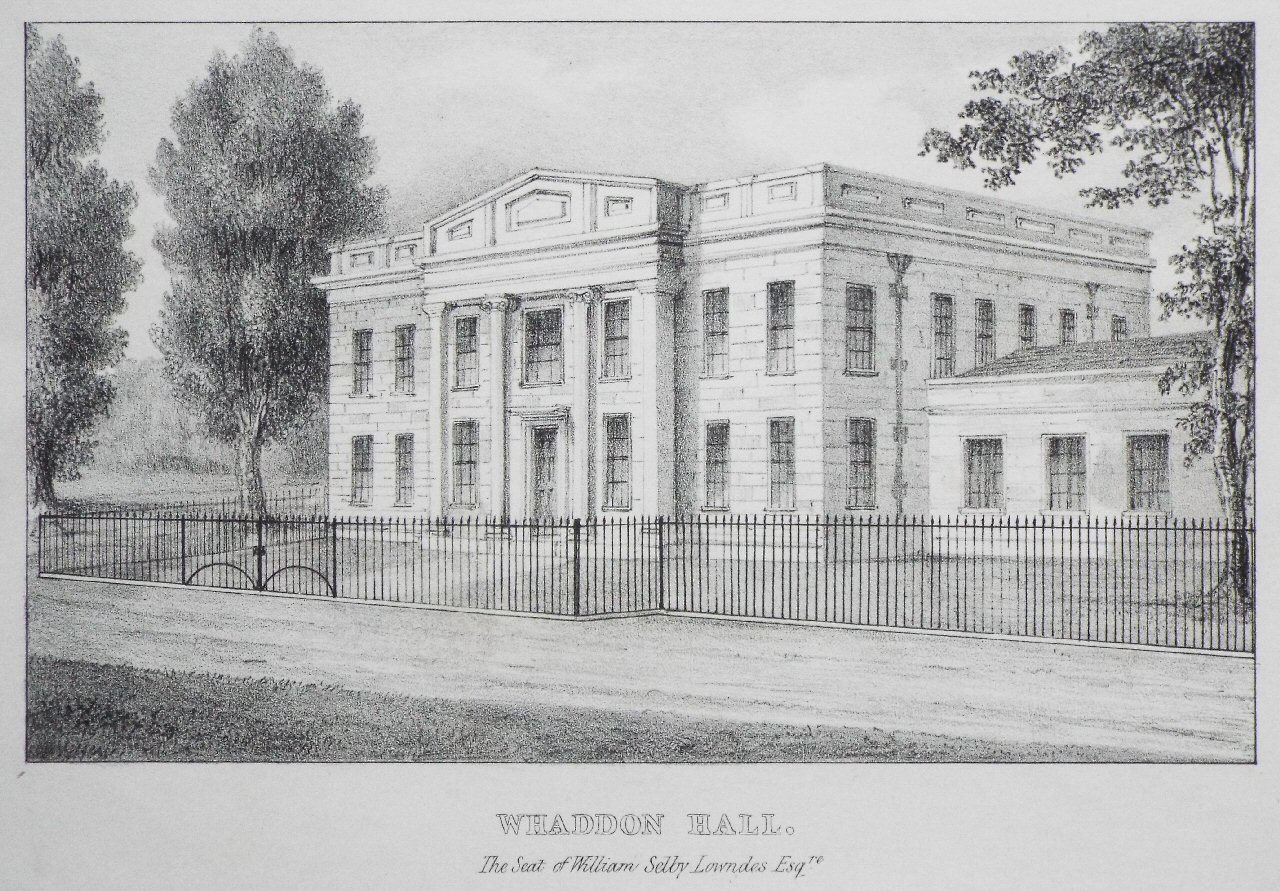
Whaddon Hall was used for communications and radio broadcasting.

The War Office requisitioned Whaddon Hall for its operations, and by the end of 1939, Gambier Parry had established his headquarters at there. He was soon joined by Harold Robin, who would be responsible for the technical side of all the department's secret broadcasting operations throughout the war. Both men had previously worked for the Philco company before the war. The estate's previous residents, the Selby Lowndes family, relocated to a nearby town.

In early 1940, Robin was tasked with building a shortwave transmitter to broadcast propaganda. After surveying the area near Whaddon, he chose a site in a large field at Gawcott, where two American-made 7.5KW transmitters were installed. The broadcasts were first recorded in a specially adapted room at Whaddon Hall, with sound-dampening material on the walls to ensure quality. These recordings, made on 16-inch glass-based discs that held about twenty minutes of material, were then sent via Post Office lines to the Gawcott transmitter for broadcast. Gambier Parry's personal secretary, Lisa Towse, who was fluent in French, wrote scripts for a clandestine station known as Radio Beaux Arts.

To support the administrative needs of the Woburn operation, many typists were recruited, primarily from organizations like the Imperial Communications Advisory Board and Thomas Cook and Son. Telephone operators were supplied by various London establishments. All personnel were bound by strict secrecy; they were forbidden from discussing their work or their location, and all personal mail had to be sent to London for posting to maintain operational security.

The military wing of the department remained in London, requiring its head, Campbell Stuart, to regularly travel between the two centers in his Rolls Royce, accompanied by his assistants and even a filing cabinet. This physical separation reduced the department's direct influence over the BBC German service, a situation exacerbated by the fact that liaison was handled by two officers provided by the BBC itself. To compensate for a general lack of firsthand knowledge of Nazi Germany among the staff, Ivone Kirkpatrick of the Foreign Office provided expert advice. His background was uniquely suited to the task; after being wounded in the First World War, he had joined a secret organization to develop propaganda methods, including successful early trials for dropping leaflets by balloon, making him a valuable advisor in the new conflict.

The creation of effective propaganda required a deep understanding of the enemy's morale and mindset. To this end, they secured a steady supply of German daily newspapers through contacts in neutral countries. By the spring, their London facility was receiving a vast amount of material shortly after publication, including ninety different German newspapers, trade journals, and periodicals, over a hundred Allied and neutral papers from sixteen countries, and numerous publications from refugee groups in Britain. A team of five linguists from the intelligence division would then analyze this content to identify useful information.

British missions in European capitals telegraphed important news, and the BBC provided transcripts of its monitoring of significant enemy broadcasts. When the German advance cut off these conventional sources, the British Legation in Stockholm was instructed to purchase every available newspaper and have the RAF fly them to Britain on a weekly basis.

== Merger into the Special Operations Executive ==
In June 1940, administrative control of the department returned to the Minister of Information, Duff Cooper. Around this time, Stuart began advocating for British propaganda to be broadcast from overseas locations. Ten days after the Fall of France, he traveled secretly to North America to explore this possibility. His mission successfully secured the Canadian government's consent for the BBC to build a shortwave station there, and he also made plans for broadcasts to Germany from either Newfoundland or Bermuda.

However, upon his return, Campbell Stuart found the BBC to be unenthusiastic about these plans. Furthermore, a significant political change had occurred. Prime Minister Churchill had invited Hugh Dalton, the new Minister of Economic Warfare, to lead a new organization for sabotage and subversion. This new body, the Special Operations Executive (SOE), was formally established on July 22, 1940. The propaganda department, Electra House, was absorbed into this new structure as its propaganda branch. In anticipation of this change, Campbell Stuart resigned on August 17 and subsequently devoted his energies to chairing the Imperial Communications Advisory Committee.

His successor was Reginald Leeper, the head of PID, who took charge of the department's "country operations." However, the new minister, Hugh Dalton, soon began to view Leeper with increasing suspicion regarding his loyalties.

== See also ==
- British anti-invasion preparations of the Second World War
- British propaganda during World War I
- British propaganda during World War II
- Office of War Information
- United States Information Agency
- Writers' War Board
- World War I film propaganda
- Committee on Public Information
