= Wellington House =

Name for Britain's War Propaganda Bureau

Coordinates: 51.499096246186035°N 0.1378205425902966°W

War Propaganda Bureau
- Wellington House

Agency overview
- Formed: 5 September 1914
- Dissolved: February 1918
- Superseding agency: Department of Propaganda in Enemy Countries
- Headquarters: Wellington House, Buckingham Gate, Westminster, London metropolitan area, S.W.1.
- Ministers responsible: H. H. Asquith, Prime Minister; David Lloyd George, Prime Minister; Secretary of State for Foreign Affairs; Minister of Information
- Agency executive: Charles Masterman
- Key documents: D-Notice; Defence of the Realm Act 1914; Official Secrets Act 1911

Wellington House is the more common name for Britain's War Propaganda Bureau, which operated during the First World War from Wellington House, a building at the corner of Petty France (formerly York Street) and Buckingham Gate (formerly James Street), in Westminster, London metropolitan area, which was the headquarters of the National Insurance Commission before the War. The Bureau, which operated under the supervision of the Foreign Office, was mainly directed at foreign targets, including Allied nations and neutral countries, especially (until 1917) the United States. The building itself has since been demolished, and its former site is now occupied by a block of flats that carries the same name.

== History ==
=== Background ===
Charles Masterman, Director of the War Propaganda Bureau

The First World War saw Germany's war declaration on 1 August 1914, whereupon the German Empire's propaganda agency, Deutscher Fichte-Bund, launched an extensive propaganda campaign using posters, leaflets, and pamphlets to justify its actions and undermine the Allies, with particular attention to shaping opinion in the United States. The Fitche-Bund had been established in January of that year.

Three days later, 4 August 1914, saw the British entry into World War I, and plans were quickly drawn up to create some form of organization which would counter the German propaganda machine. The issue was deliberated in the Cabinet of the United Kingdom, where the Chancellor of the Exchequer, David Lloyd George, emphasized the need for an official body to inform and influence foreign opinion and to refute German claims. When the war first broke out, however, there was no singular coordination for the management of war propaganda. A number of government agencies and departments vied to produce propaganda.

After that session of Cabinet, Lloyd George approached his fellow Liberal MP, the Chancellor of the Duchy of Lancaster at the time, Charles Masterman, to completely form and head the proposed organization in the manner to which that Masterman saw fit, which did not yet have any official name. Masterman at that time was also the chairman of the National Insurance Commission (NIC), which was headquartered out of the Wellington House Hotel building on the corner of York Street and Buckingham Gate in Westminster, constructed around 1908, and which had been purchased by the NIC in 1911. Before formally establishing the bureau, Masterman convened two conferences in Wellington House at the beginning of September to outline methods and principles for wartime publicity.

==== Writer's conference on propaganda (2 September) ====
The first of these two conferences on 2 September 1914 was organized to draw-up and design influence campaigns for implementation in fiction and literary circles. Masterman invited 25 leading British authors to the conference rooms at Wellington House to discuss ways of best promoting Britain's interests during the war. In addition to the writers, Masterman also invited Claud Schuster, 1st Baron Schuster and several representatives from the Foreign Office to participate in the discussions.

As the professional writers in attendance were in the habit of keeping journals and writing letters, we know that the meeting took place in the afternoon, nearly at golden hour; the sun was described as yellow, and the conference table was described as blue. Thomas Hardy writes that they were "...confused deliberations in a melancholy manner..." Arnold Bennett writes that Israel Zangwill talked too much, that the only smart ones in the room were Wells and Chesterton, and that he was disappointed by Gilbert Murray. Apparently, Bennett and J. M. Barrie had never met before, and Barrie took the chance to make small talk.

Those 25 writers in attendance were the following:

- William Archer
- J. M. Barrie
- Arnold Bennett
- A. C. Benson
- Robert Hugh Benson
- Robert Bridges
- Hall Caine
- G. K. Chesterton
- Arthur Conan Doyle
- John Galsworthy
- Thomas Hardy
- Anthony Hope Hawkins
- Maurice Hewlett
- William John Locke
- E. V. Lucas
- John William Mackail
- John Masefield
- A. E. W. Mason
- Gilbert Murray
- Henry Newbolt
- Gilbert Parker
- Owen Seaman
- G. M. Trevelyan
- H. G. Wells
- Israel Zangwill

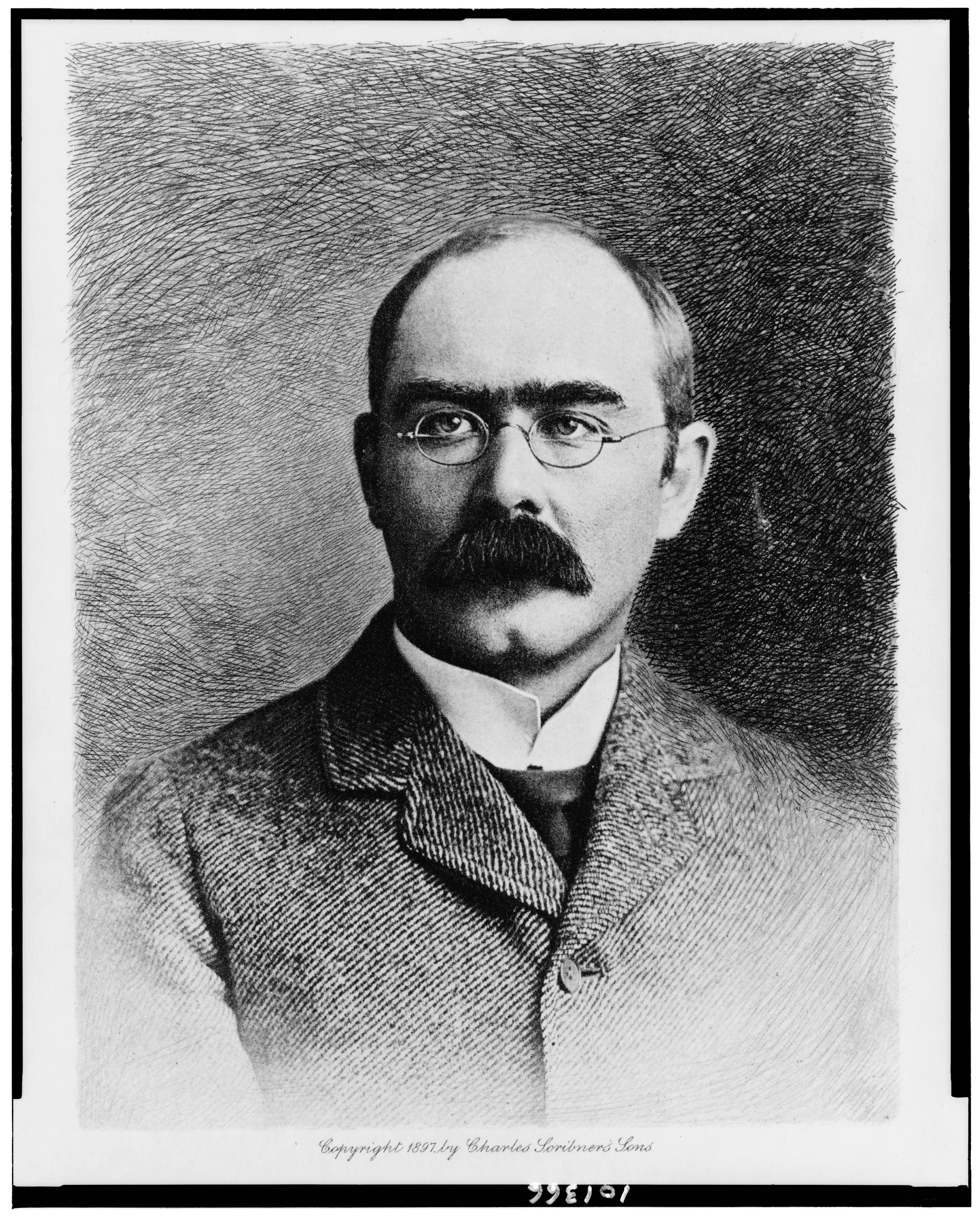
One of the greatest advocates for the British war effort leading up to the establishment of Wellington House was Rudyard Kipling, the author of The Jungle Book.

Rudyard Kipling had been invited to the meeting but was unable to attend, but did send a note of his complete support and readiness to cooperate fully. Arthur Quiller-Couch was also invited, but unable to make it to the meeting. Also notably absent from this meeting, and many of the following efforts of the Bureau, was William Le Queux, who had been Britain's top propagandist in the pre-war years. Joseph Conrad was out of town when the meeting was called, travelling back to England from Poland. However, the historian Peter Buitenhuis writes that: "Even without them this was probably the most important gathering of creative and academic writers ever assembled for an official purpose in the history of English letters."

All the writers who attended agreed to maintain the utmost secrecy, and it was not until 1935 that the activities of the "War Propaganda Bureau" became public knowledge. Several of the writers agreed to write pamphlets and books that would promote the government's point of view; these were printed and published by such well-known publishers as Hodder & Stoughton, Methuen, Oxford University Press, John Murray, Macmillan and Thomas Nelson. The War Propaganda Bureau went on to publish over 1,160 pamphlets during the war.

==== The conference of notable journalists and publishers (7 September) ====
Five days after the gathering of the fiction writers, on 7 September 1914, Masterman held a second meeting at Wellington House, attended by the leading newspaper editors and publishers of the age.

=== Official establishment ===
On 5 September 1914, the Cabinet approved the creation of an organization to coordinate British propaganda abroad. Masterman was officially appointed as the director of the new bureau. Because the new organization was established out of Wellington House, it adopted the name as an official cover. For the following two years, Wellington House functioned as the principal centre for British propaganda activities. Its operations were conducted with considerable effectiveness and secrecy, to the extent that even members of Parliament were largely unaware of its existence. Many of the officials who served under Masterman at the National Insurance Commission joined him in the new organization, while additional specialists from outside government were recruited to contribute their expertise in various fields. James Headlam-Morley, Arnold J. Toynbee, Lewis Namier, and Anthony Hope were some of these additional experts. The name of the War Propaganda Bureau was kept in complete secrecy, so secret that even members of Parliament were not informed of its existence. Certain MPs did occasionally ask why Masterman's paycheck was so high, considering that he was no longer working in the Cabinet, to which the reply was that he was working on private work for the Prime Minister.

=== Author's Declaration (1914) ===
One of the chief objectives of Wellington House was to cultivate support for the British war effort in the United States. Among its earliest initiatives was the publication of the Authors’ Declaration, a manifesto written by Masterman and signed by leading British writers and academics. The statement affirmed the justice of Britain’s cause, defended the neutrality of Belgium, and condemned the German invasion as an act of aggression. Several signatories noted that, although they had previously been sympathetic to Germany, the outbreak of war had altered their views.

The document, bearing more than fifty signatures, was transmitted by cable to The New York Times, which printed it on 18 September 1914. A second, expanded version appeared on 18 October, presented as a full-page feature with facsimiles of the signatures and explanatory notes identifying the contributors for the American audience.

The signatures featured on that page, signed in alphabetical order, were the following:

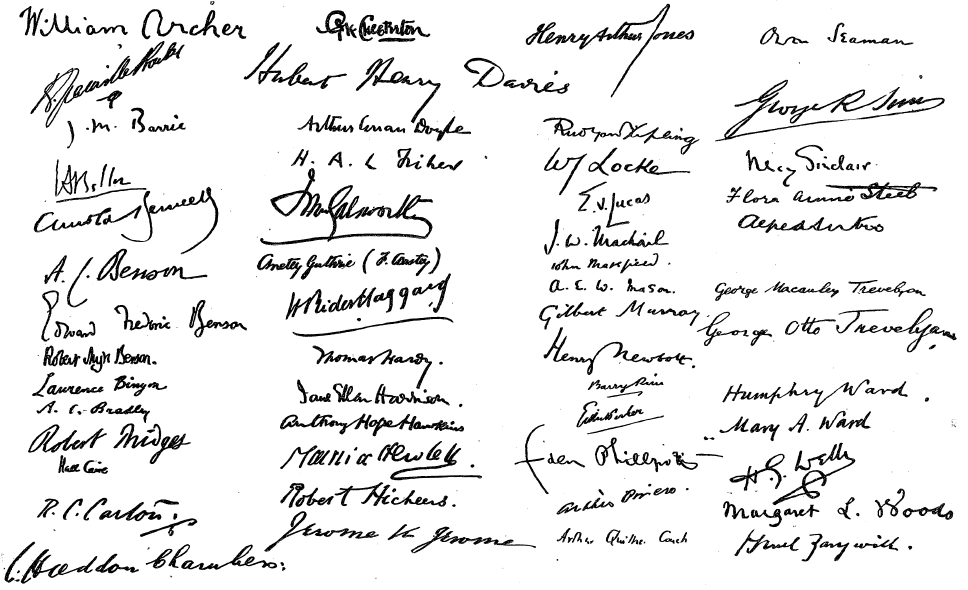

- William Archer
- H. Granville Barker
- Sir James Matthew Barrie
- Hilaire Belloc
- Arnold Bennett
- Arthur Christopher Benson
- Edward Frederic Benson
- Very Rev. Monsignor Robert Hugh Benson
- Lawrence Binyon
- Andrew Cecil Bradley
- Robert Bridges
- Hall Caine
- R. C. Carton
- Charles Haddon Chambers
- Gilbert K. Chesterton
- Hubert Henry Davies
- Sir Arthur Conan Doyle
- Herbert Albert Laurens Fisher
- John Galsworthy
- Anstey Guthrie (F. Anstey)
- Sir Henry Rider Haggard
- Thomas Hardy
- Jane Ellen Harrison
- Anthony Hope Hawkins
- Maurice Hewlett
- Robert Hichens
- Jerome K. Jerome
- Henry Arthur Jones
- Rudyard Kipling
- William J. Locke
- Edward Verrall Lucas
- John William Mackail
- John Masefield
- Alfred Edward Woodley Mason
- Gilbert Murray
- Henry Newbolt
- Barry Pain
- Sir Gilbert Parker
- Eden Phillpotts
- Sir Arthur Wing Pinero
- Sir Arthur Quiller-Couch
- Sir Owen Seaman
- George R. Sims
- May Sinclair
- Flora Annie Steel
- Alfred Sutro
- George Macaulay Trevelyan
- Rt. Hon. George Otto Trevelyan
- Humphry Ward
- Mary A. Ward
- H.G. Wells
- Margaret L. Woods
- Israel Zangwill

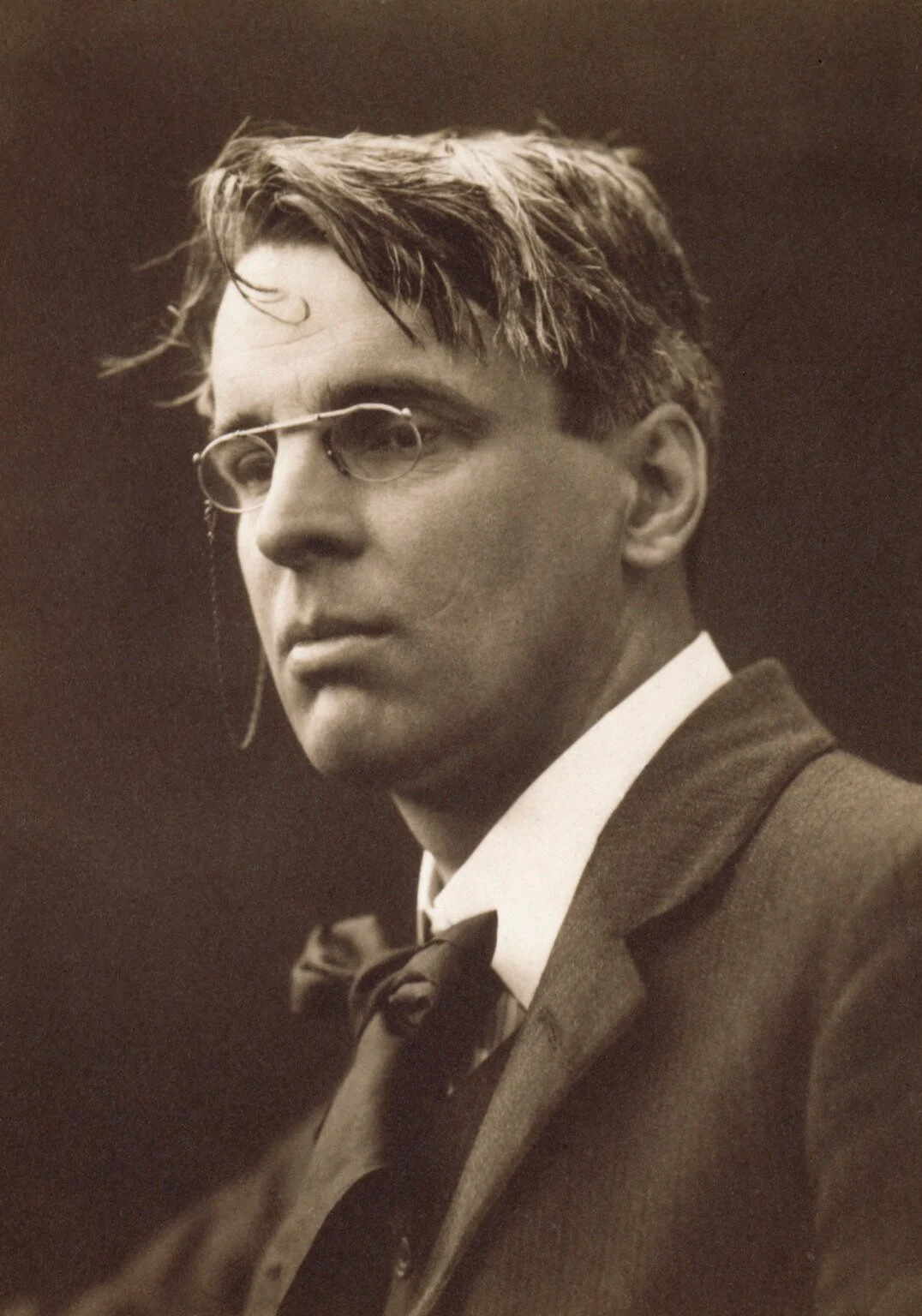
William Butler Yeats outright refused to be a part of the Declaration, despite being personally requested.

Professor Nick Milne, from Oxford University, notes that this list of signatories reveals a literary hierarchy very different from today's academic canon. The declaration presented a sort of unified cultural front of the mainstream literary establishment of 1914. The brief descriptions accompanying each name on the declaration are telling of the different status these authors maintained in their day. For instance, Thomas Hardy is praised as the "greatest living novelist," ignoring his pivot to poetry, while H. G. Wells is noted for social novels like Tono Bungay, not his famous science fiction.

However, its purposeful exclusions and the subsequent fading of many once-famous names show that this unity was both selective and transient. Notably absent were many of the Modernists (like Ezra Pound) and the anti-war Bloomsbury Group (like Virginia Woolf), who were either not established or not ideologically suitable. Even the famous George Bernard Shaw was deliberately excluded for his controversial views.

In a 1914 letter, W. B. Yeats refused to sign the Declaration at the request of Sir Gilbert Murray. Yeats rejected the Declaration as an insincere manifesto, and derivative of what he considered lying newspapers, writing: "I long for the defeat of the Germans but your manifesto reads like an extract from the newspapers, and newspapers are liars. What have we novelists, poets, whatever we are, to do with them?" He expressed skepticism about who was truly to blame for the war, citing "secret diplomacy," and doubted the document's power to influence anyone. He dismissed contemporary reports of Germany's atrocities as unproven propaganda, and suggested that investigation should wait for an impartial post-war tribunal.

The declaration did, however, include several prominent women, such as Mary Augusta Ward and May Sinclair, whose propagandistic work is often overlooked today. Sinclair, as one of the more popular Suffragettes, found herself distanced from the bulk of her pacifist comrades in the Suffrage movement. Only ten days after the Declaration was first published, on 25 September 1914, Sinclair joined the Munro Ambulance Corps, a volunteer medical unit organized to assist the Red Cross in Belgium.

While the list features currently popular names like Rudyard Kipling and Thomas Hardy, it is also filled with figures now obscure to most students, such as E. V. Lucas and Alfred Sutro. Their inclusion highlights the gap between their then-significant popular reputations and their current standing, a perspective obscured by the later triumph of Modernism.

In response to the Authors’ Declaration, the German government organized the Manifesto of the Ninety-Three, a statement signed by a larger group of German intellectuals, artists, and scientists. The document rejected all accusations of misconduct by German forces in Belgium and defended Germany’s actions during the early stages of the war. It also included statements alleging that the Allied powers had encouraged non-European troops to take part in the conflict.

=== Organizational structure ===
Wellington Houses's permanent staff were primarily civil servants. Certain academics and MPs volunteered their time and services to the work. The famous names; the writers, artists, authors, journalists, and so on, were primarily employed through contracts.

The work of Wellington House was divided into linguistic sections:

- Scandinavia
- Holland
- Italy and Switzerland
- Spain, Portugal, and Latin America
- United States of America
- Germany
  - The German language section were assigned as liaison officers working out of the intelligence departments of the Admiralty and the War Office

Each section was responsible for monitoring the foreign press, assessing public opinion, and responding to developments in the region it covered. Its tasks included preparing or translating material that could positively influence opinion abroad, circulating speeches and official statements, and maintaining contact with individuals who could assist in shaping attitudes toward Britain. In the case of the United States, particular attention was given to engaging visiting journalists and public figures in London who might convey a favorable view of British policy.

From time to time, representatives were dispatched to various countries to assess sentiment and recommend measures to reduce hostility or misunderstanding of Britain’s actions. To maintain discretion, all propaganda material was distributed indirectly, through unofficial channels and personal contacts, rather than through overt government communication. The bureau deliberately avoided large-scale publicity drives resembling those used by Germany.

In addition to official efforts, many voluntary groups and private individuals undertook independent propaganda work. While their enthusiasm was often helpful, it also required coordination. Masterman and his staff devoted increasing effort to guiding, organizing, and at times restraining these unofficial activities to ensure consistency. Such voluntary organizations proved useful primarily as distribution networks, though they did not always welcome the subordinate role envisioned for them by Wellington House.

== Organizational changes ==
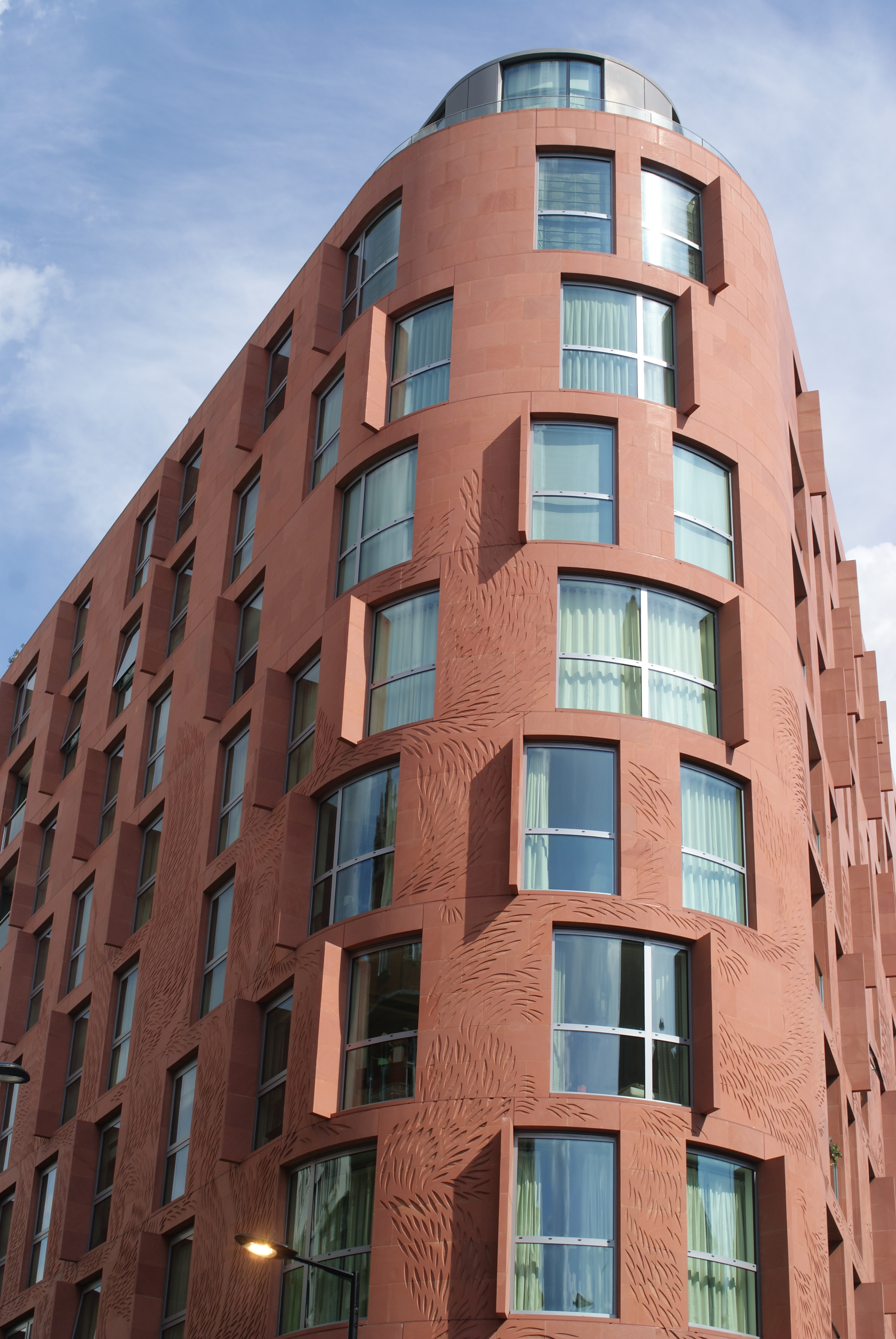
A block of flats took the name, and now sits on the same spot where the original Wellington House once stood.

Because the government was worried that the lack of coordination between propaganda efforts might be negatively affecting the war effort, after January 1916 the Bureau's activities were subsumed under the Foreign Office. In addition, the Neutral Press Committee was merged into the News Department at the Home Office.

In February 1917 the government established a Department of Information, reporting directly to the Prime Minister. John Buchan was promoted to Lieutenant Colonel and put in charge of it at an annual salary of £1,000. At this point, the News Department, the Neutral Press Committee, and Wellington House were merged into Buchan's command. Masterman retained responsibility for books, pamphlets, photographs and war art, while T. L. Gilmour was responsible for telegraph communications, radio, newspapers, magazines and the cinema.

In early 1918 it was decided that a senior government figure should take over responsibility for propaganda and on 4 March Lord Beaverbrook, owner of the Daily Express newspaper, was made Minister of Information. Masterman was placed beneath him as Director of Publications, and John Buchan as Director of Intelligence. Lord Northcliffe, owner of The Times and the Daily Mail, was put in charge of propaganda aimed at enemy nations, while Robert Donald, editor of the Daily Chronicle, was made director of propaganda aimed at neutral nations. Following the announcement, in February 1918, Lloyd George was accused of creating this new system to gain control over Fleet Street's leading figures.

The newly minted department under Viscount Northcliffe was the Department of Propaganda in Enemy Countries, more commonly known as "Crewe House," which operated for the roughly 8 months through to the end of the war, and was later reestablished as "Electra House," under Campbell Stuart after intelligence of German rearmament reached the desk of Neville Chamberlain.

The ministry was dissolved on 31 December 1918.

== Known publications produced through Wellington House ==
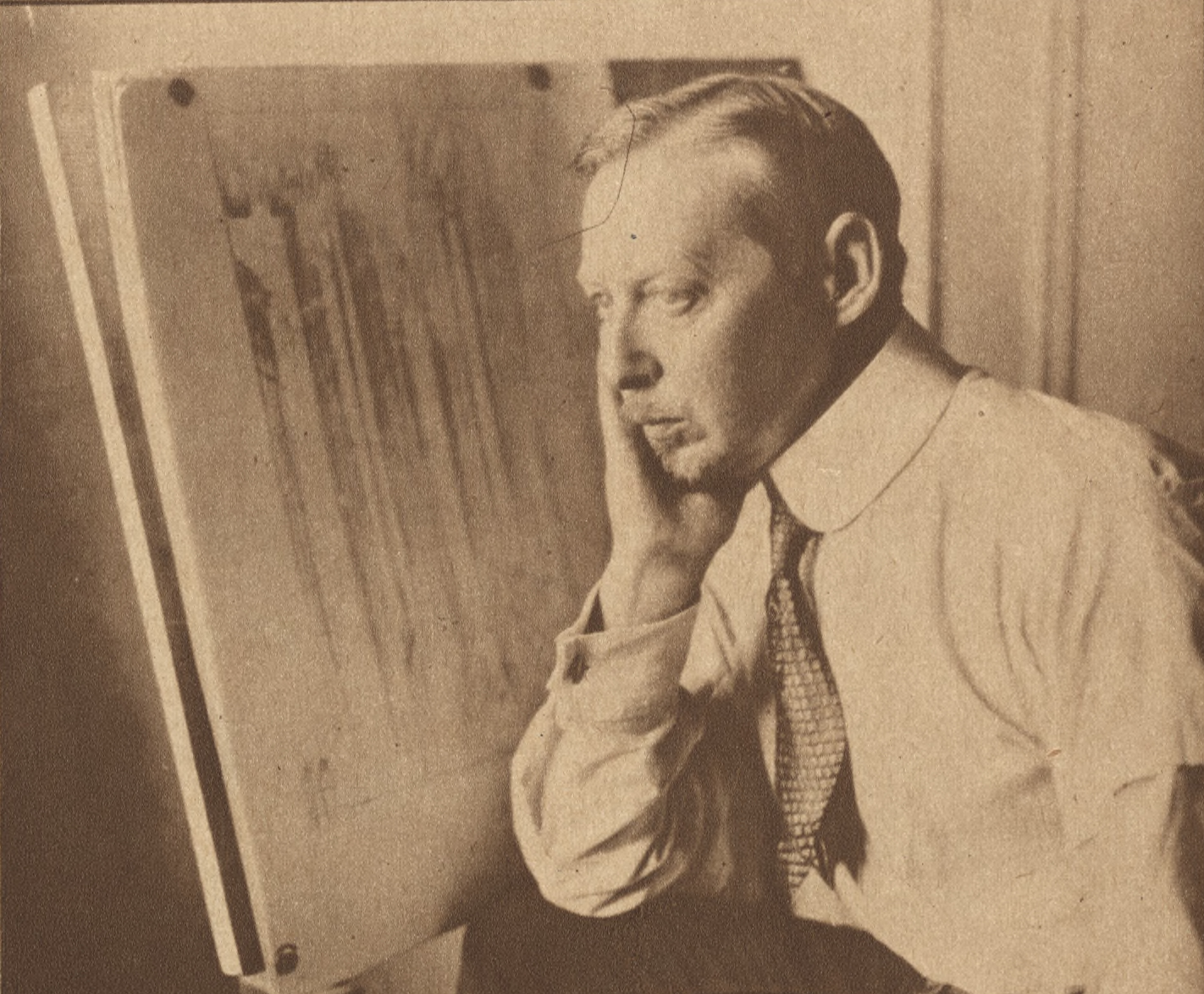
Louis Raemaekers needed no convincing to add his artistic talent to Wellington House's publications.

One of the first significant publications to be produced by the Bureau was the Report on Alleged German Outrages, in early 1915. This pamphlet documented atrocities both actual and alleged committed by the German army against Belgian civilians. A Dutch illustrator, Louis Raemaekers, provided highly emotional drawings which appeared in the pamphlet.

One of Masterman's early projects was a history of the war to be published as a monthly magazine, for which he recruited John Buchan to head its production. Published by Buchan's own publishers, Thomas Nelson, the first installment of the Nelson's History of the War appeared in February 1915. A further 23 editions appeared regularly during the war. Buchan was given the rank of Second Lieutenant in the Intelligence Corps and provided with the necessary documents to write the work. General Headquarters Staff saw this as very good for propaganda as Buchan's close relationship with Britain's military leaders made it very difficult for him to include any criticism about the way the war was being conducted.

In May 1916 Masterman recruited artist Muirhead Bone. He was sent to France and by October had produced 150 drawings. After Bone returned to England he was replaced by his brother-in-law, Francis Dodd, who had been working for the Manchester Guardian.

In 1917, arrangements were made to send other artists to France including Eric Kennington, William Orpen, Paul Nash, C. R. W. Nevinson and William Rothenstein. John Lavery was recruited to paint pictures of the home front. Nash later complained about the strict control maintained by the Bureau over the official subject matter, saying "I am no longer an artist. I am an artist who will bring back word from the men who are fighting to those who want the war to go on forever. Feeble, inarticulate will be my message, but it will have a bitter truth and may it burn their lousy souls."

=== Books and pamphlets ===
Arnold Bennett

- Liberty: A Statement of the British Case (also as an article)
- Over There: War Scenes on the Western Front

Ford Madox Ford

- When Blood is Their Argument
- Between St. Dennis and St. George

John Buchan

- Nelson's History of the War (24 volumes)
- The Battle of the Somme: The First Phase
- The Battle of the Somme: Second Phase

Rudyard Kipling

- France at War
- The Fringes of the Fleet
- Destroyers at Jutland
- The War in the Mountains

Sir Arthur Conan Doyle

- A Visit to Three Fronts
- Sherlock Holmes: The Last Bow
- Military histories

Hilaire Belloc

- Military histories

=== Poems ===
Rudyard Kipling

- France
- Mary Postgate
- Sea Constables

Thomas Hardy

- A Call to National Service
- The Pity of It

=== Articles and other written pieces ===
Arnold Bennett

- Over 400 propaganda pieces

=== Artworks ===
Louis Raemaekers

- Many cartoons

Muirhead Bone

- An Artillery Barrage on the Somme Battlefield
- Ruined Trenches in Mametz Wood
- Distant Lens from Notre Dame de Lorette
- The Church of Athies, May 1917
- The Gun Pit: A Gun Jacket Entering the Oil Tank
- The Hall of the Million Shells
- Amiens Cathedral

C. R. W. Nevinson

- After a Push
- Bursting Shell
- A Group of Soldiers
- Paths of Glory

Paul Nash

- Sunrise, Inverness Copse
- We are Making a New World
- Crater Pools, Below Hill 60

== In popular culture ==
- In the 2007 film My Boy Jack, part of the plot deals with Rudyard Kipling's duties as a propagandist, and features a meeting of a fictionalized 4-member "Propaganda Committee, War Office," based loosely on Wellington House and the Ministry of Information
- In the 2012 BBC production Parade's End, the actor Stephen Graham portrays the fictional character Vincent McMaster, based largely on Charles Masterman

== See also ==
- British propaganda in World War I
- Office of War Information
- United States Information Agency
- Writers' War Board
- World War I film propaganda
- Committee on Public Information
- Ministry of Information (United Kingdom)
