= Electra House =

Building in London, England

Coordinates: 51.5177°N 0.0882°W

Electra House was the name of two distinct and individual buildings in London, England, both of which were built for and occupied by the same telegraphy company, and both of which were used by the British government during World War II, and only one of which still stands to this day. The original Electra House, called the Electra House Moorgate, or Electra House Senior, was a building at 84 Moorgate, in London, England. This building, constructed in 1902, originally served as the headquarters of the Eastern and Associated Telegraph Companies (later known as Cable & Wireless Limited). Electra House Moorgate is notable as the wartime London base of Eastern Telegraph, and as the headquarters of the eponymous Electra House (Department EH) — one of the three British organisations that merged in World War II to form the Special Operations Executive. This Foreign Office organization spied on foreign embassies, produced propaganda, and connected with resistance movements across the continent of Europe.

The second Electra House was named the Electra House Victoria, Electra House Embankment, or Electra House Junior. It was located at 4 Temple Place, on the Victoria Embankment and completed in 1929, functioned as the firm’s administrative centre. In 1935, the Eastern Telegraph company was reorganized under the name Cable and Wireless Limited. Also headquartered here was the Marconi Wireless Telegraph Company. This building during the war served as a secondary location for Department EH, connected by telegraphy, and could serve as a redundancy in case of damage by bombing. Electra House Victoria was torn down in 1999 and completely replaced by a new office building which stands in the same spot today, called the Globe House.

Both Electra House buildings were bombed during the war, but the original Electra House Moorgate is the only one that still survives with the name, and from September 2024, it is the campus for the Fashion Retail Academy, a further education and higher education college.

It is not to be confused with Electra House in Brixton, the depot for London Underground Train Operators based at Brixton on the Victoria Line.

== Electra House Moorgate ==
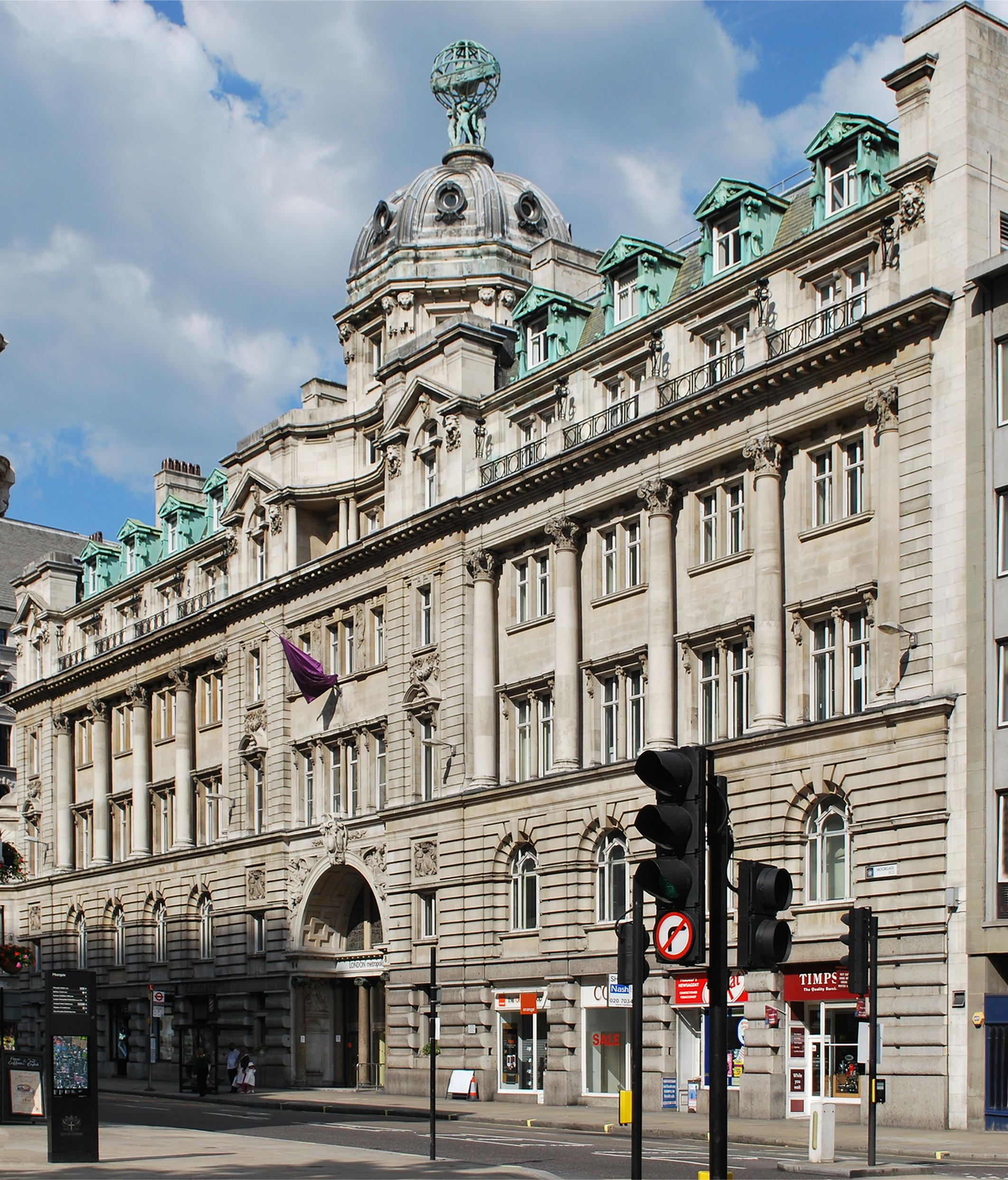
The Original Electra House at 84 Moorgate.

Architect John Belcher designed the original Electra House, which opened in 1902 as accommodation for the Eastern and Associated Telegraph Companies. The building features refined decorative sculpture works distributed across five floors, each modest in scale but collectively contributing to the building’s architectural distinction. The sculptural work represents a collaboration between several leading figures of the New Sculpture movement: Alfred Drury, F. W. Pomeroy, George Frampton, and William Goscombe John. Just inside the entrance of the building is a mural by the artist George Murray.

During the Second World War, under the authority of the Wartime Powers Act, the Foreign Office acquired part of the building, and especially the telegraph cables contained here. Electra House became the headquarters for a secret propaganda organisation also known simply as Electra House, but referred to by many historians as Department EH to avoid confusion. Department EH was involved in the monitoring of foreign embassy communications, and cabling run between both buildings ensured continuance of this service even following direct bomb damage during World War II.

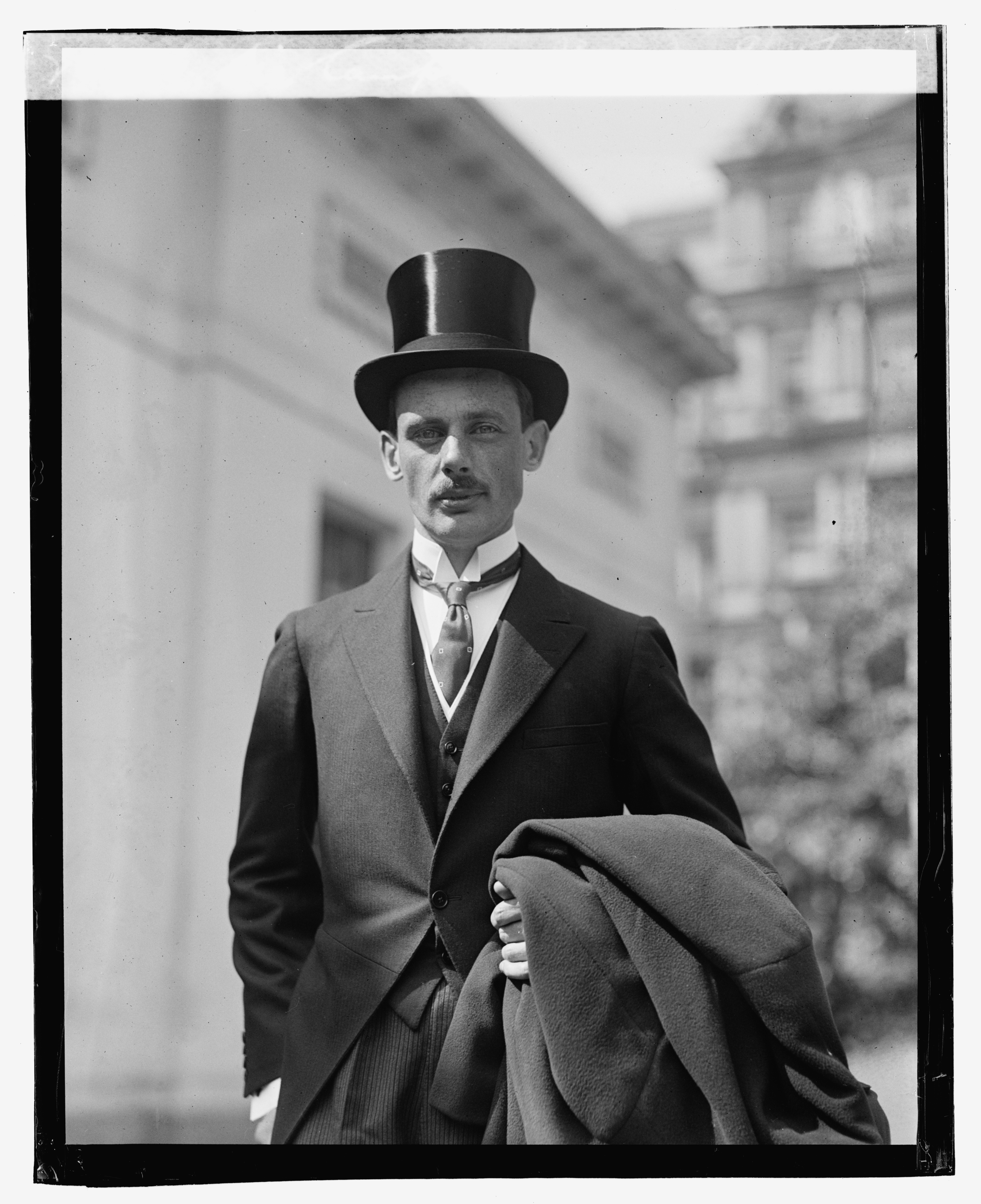
During the war, Sir Campbell Stuart was the Director of Department EH, and the Chairman of the Eastern Telegraph Company.

However, the more simple explanation for the working relationship between Eastern Telegraph and Department EH is that Sir Campbell Stuart was both the chairman of Eastern Telegraph and the director of the government's propaganda section. This same man ran both organizations, as he had been personally requested by Neville Chamberlain to create a section which might be able to predict the rise and spread of Nazism, and the other Fascisms, on the European continent.

At the start of the war, Eastern Telegraph managed 155,000 miles of the 350,000-mile global cable network and approximately 130 permanent wireless circuits. Under the Official Secrets Act, the company was required to provide the government with copies of all traffic for review by the Government Code and Cypher School (GC&CS). Every employee who worked in this building had also signed the Official Secrets Act.

On the night of 10 May 1941, the final night of the London Blitz, the first Electra House at 84 Moorgate sustained heavy damage after being struck by several incendiary bombs. A subsequent explosion in a neighbouring building worsened the destruction, rendering the premises unusable. No staff were injured, and operations were transferred to the other Electra House on Victoria Embankment, which subsequently became the principal communications centre for Cable and Wireless.

Before the building could become reoccupied, the building’s Portland stone façade underwent extensive restoration, including water-spray cleaning, the use of the JOS air abrasive system to remove ingrained dirt, and poultice treatments for deep copper staining. Damaged architectural details such as scroll brackets, lion-head motifs, and sections of ashlar were replaced or repaired in situ. Outdated bird-repellent gel strips were carefully removed and replaced with a stainless-steel wire system. Major roof-level work included the installation of insulation, rooflight renovation, complete asphalt renewal, and the addition of new lead for the cornice and weathering. A new Kee Klamp handrail was also installed to secure the fire escape route. All exterior joinery and metalwork were restored and repainted. The building’s original design featured twelve carved lions—eight along the Moorgate façade and four on the adjoining street—along with twelve additional lions adorning the cupola.

Following its repair from bomb damage, City of London College moved into Electra House Moorgate in 1944 and occupied the building, including when it became part of London Metropolitan University, until 2017.

In 2021 a major £21 million renovation was announced.

=== Present use ===
Following a £50 million renovation, the Fashion Retail Academy moved to Electra House Moorgate in September 2024 from its previous location at 15 Gresse Street. Facilities at the newly-opened campus include a library housing over 5,000 fashion books and publications, 28 multi-purpose classrooms, 6 lecture theatres, a fashion design wing, photography studio and a number of social and collaborative spaces including a coffee shop for students.

The ground floor reception area will also incorporate a small museum exploring the history of Electra House, which will be open to the public.

== Electra House Victoria ==
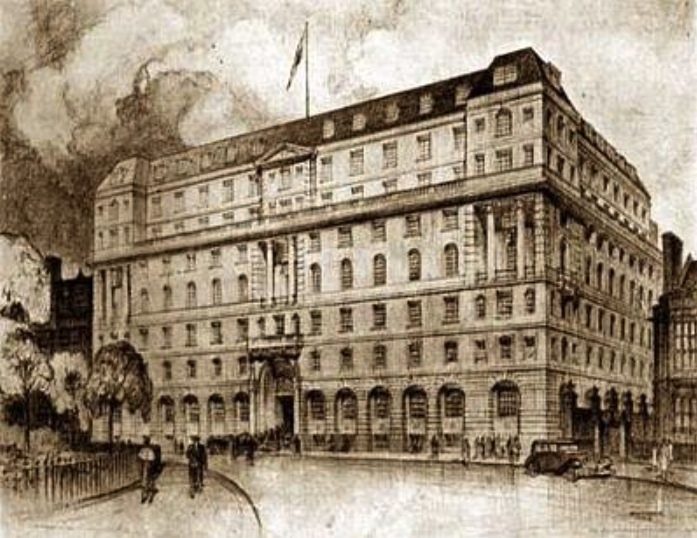
Electra House Victoria was located at 4 Temple Place, was completed in 1929 and in 1933 became the home of Imperial and International Communications (formerly Eastern Telegraph), and the Head Office of Marconi's Wireless Telegraph Company

Electra House on the Victoria Embankment was completed in 1929 on the site of the former London School Board building. Designed by Sir Herbert Baker, the building featured a prominent façade set back from the pavement, offering a clear view of 2 Temple Place across the street. Retrofits to the building were later performed, and the building was rededicated on 11 May 1933, by the wife of John Cuthbert Denison-Pender. The company transferred administrative functions to the new Electra House. This became the administrative headquarters for the renamed Imperial and International Communications, which became known as Cable & Wireless Limited the following year, in 1934.

Beyond its commercial role, the site served a covert function for Department EH: underground conduits connected it to the Central Telegraph Exchange at Moorgate, enabling the monitoring of telephone lines used by foreign embassies in London. In the event of damage to Moorgate, Electra House Victoria — staffed by around one hundred government cable operators — could assume full control of operations.

Electra House Victoria had been designed in its retrofits to be impregnable; advertised as gas proof and bomb resistant. However, Electra House Victoria was itself also subsequently hit by a V-1 flying bomb in July 1944, and this resulted in three fatalities, including the complete destruction of the Chairman's flat. The staff in the building that day, numbering over 400, worked through the night to repair operations, and despite the destruction, work resumed under generator power by 4:10 a.m.

After the war, Electra House continued to be a hub for telecommunications activities by its eventual owners, BT Group, until its final demolition in 1999 and replacement by a new building, now occupied by British American Tobacco. The Electra House Retired Colleagues Association, formed from staff of Electra House Victoria and other BT Group offices, continue to stay in contact and meet.
