= Marylands =

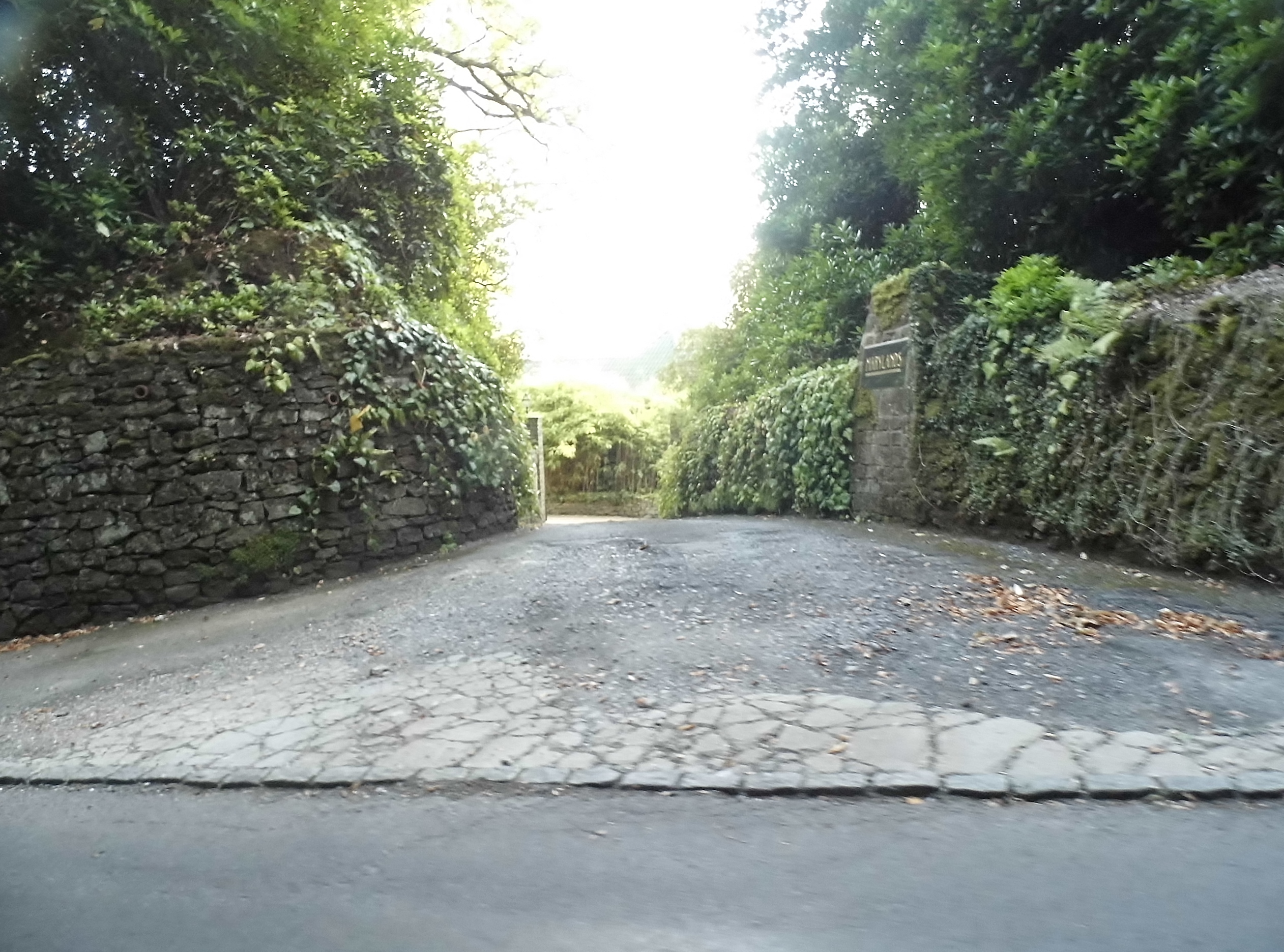
- Entrance to Marylands

- Location within Surrey
- 51°10′01″N 0°27′09″W
- Location: Ewhurst, Surrey
- OS grid reference: TQ 08292 42008

History
- Built: 1929–1931

Site notes
- Architect: Oliver Hill

Listed Building – Grade II*
- Official name: Marylands
- Designated: 10 May 1994
- Reference no.: 1253713

Marylands is a Spanish-style country house on Pitch Hill, a rural part of Ewhurst, Surrey, England. It is a Grade II* listed building, designed during 1929–31 by architect Oliver Hill. The gardens were planted by Gertrude Jekyll.

== Architecture ==
The house is made of Bargate stone sandstone with a green Swedish pantiled roof inspired by Spanish architecture and Lutyens. The two wings are linked by a stone terrace incorporating a Moorish curved pool, and the house has many stone and brick embellishments, such as fireplaces and window features. Servants' bells survive.

== History ==
The house was constructed by Oliver Hill between 1929 and 1931 for M. C. Warner. During World War II the house was let to Colonel Tatsumi, who served as Japanese Military Attaché to London, and Władysław Sikorski, the Polish prime minister of his government in exile.

== In media ==
The house was used as a filming location in Agatha Christie's Poirot in the episode Dead Man's Mirror.
