= World War I film propaganda =

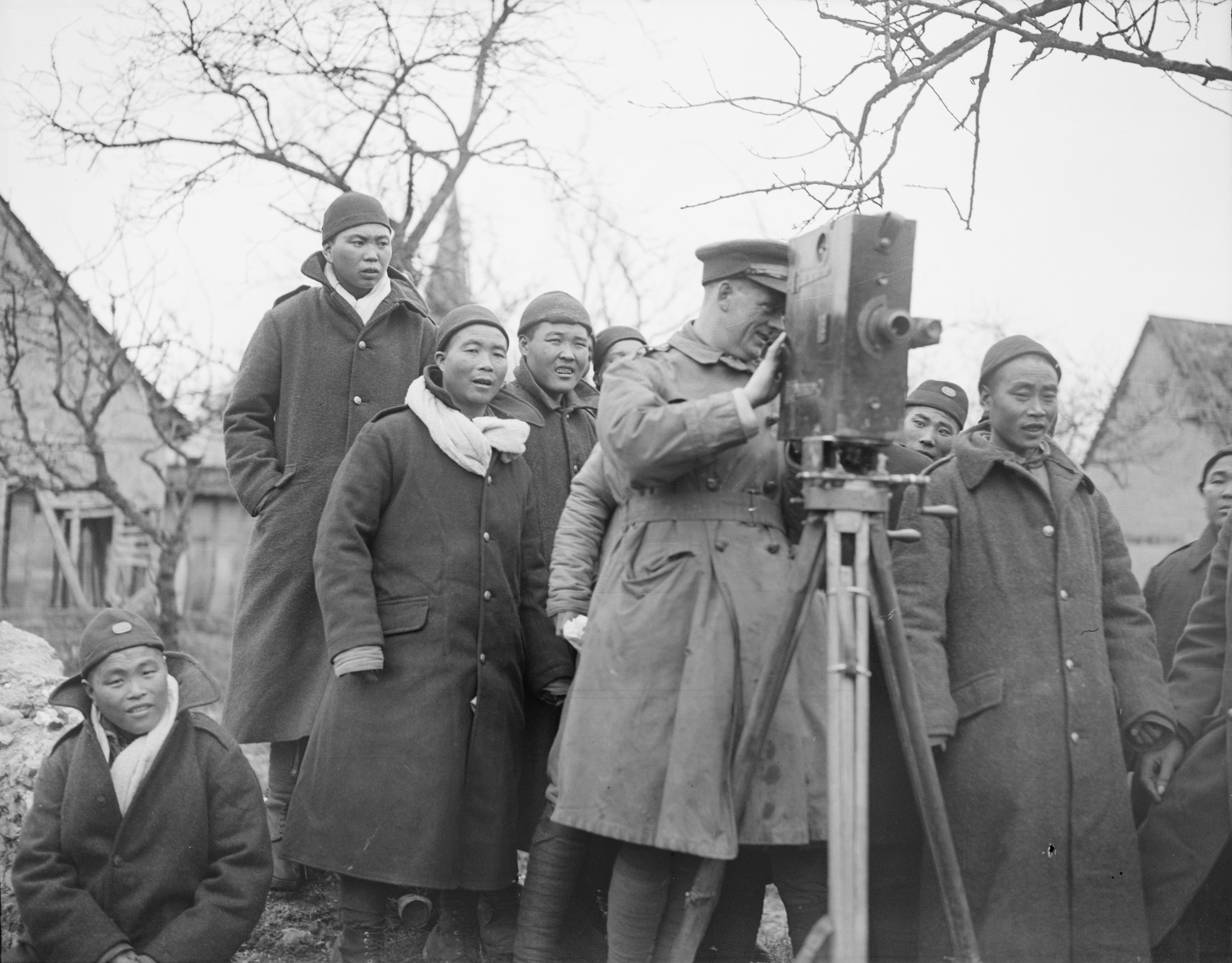
A British official cameraman, with members of the Chinese Labour Corps, February 1918. By World War I, camera technology had become portable enough to use in war zones.

Nations were new to cinema and its capability to spread and influence mass sentiment at the start of World War I. The early years of the war were experimental with using films as a propaganda tool. Eventually, they became a central instrument for what George Mosse has called the "nationalization of the masses" as nations learned to manipulate emotions to mobilize the people for a national cause against the imagined or real enemy.

== Britain ==
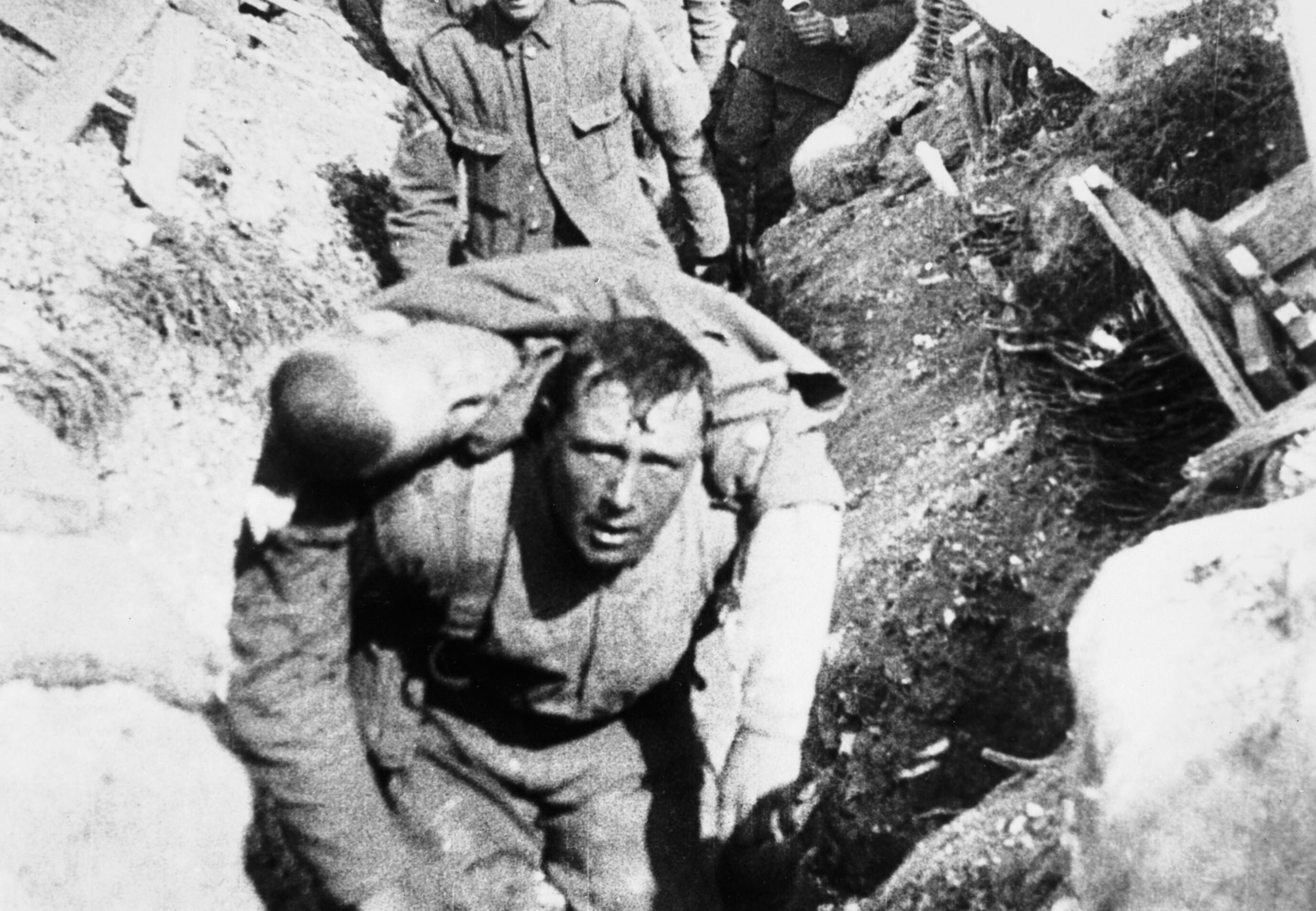
A scene from The Battle of the Somme

British efforts in pro-war film production took some time to find their stride, as it, unlike Germany, did not realize the potential of film as a means of projecting the nation's official point of view. The British recognized early in the war that they needed to target neutral audiences, specifically America, to either get them to join the war or further support the war effort in Britain. One of the leading figures in bringing British war films to the U.S. was Charles Urban, the best-known film producer in England at the time. He first brought Britain Prepared to the States in early 1916 and The Battle of the Somme in August 1916, both of whose rights were sold to the Patriot Film Corporation. Neither achieved the success the British sought, in part because of Urban's and Wellington House's refusal to address Urban's German ancestry, or that the British government produced the films with the intention of winning over American audiences. This stance changed in November 1916, when the British created the War Office Cinematograph Committee (WOCC), under which the film's official intent was to be known. It was absorbed by the Department of Information (DOI) early in 1917.

== United States ==
Documentary on the official American film cameramen in World War I

The U.S. entered the war in April 1917, which achieved Wellington House's primary objective. The DOI increased its production of war films, but did not know what would play most effectively in the U.S., leading to nearly every British war film being sent to the States thereafter, including The Tanks in Action at the Battle of the Ancre and The Retreat of the Germans at the Battle of Arras, both of which were eventually released as serials. It also turned away from feature-length films because they took longer to produce, leaving greater gaps between releases. The DOI found it better to constantly release films and shorts of varying lengths and topics, including newsreels, to increase market saturation. Newsreels became increasingly popular and a part of the standard war propaganda policy with the DOI and its successor, the Ministry of Information.

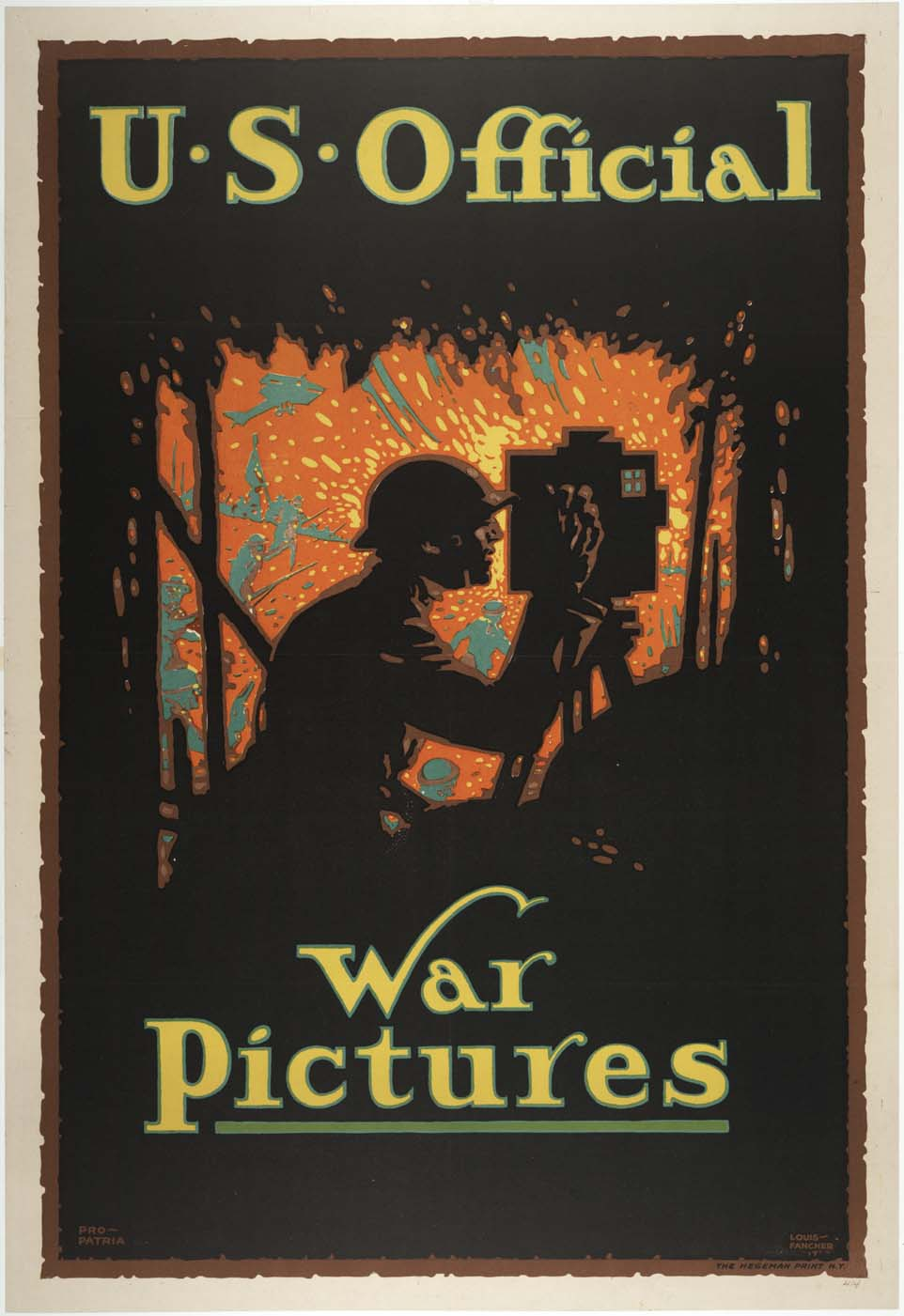
Propaganda poster by Louis D. Fancher

The U.S. developed its own propaganda organization, the Committee on Public Information (CPI), days after the declaration of war. Originally wary of film as a propaganda medium, it created the Division of Films on 25 September 1917 to handle films taken by army Signal Corps cameramen. It did not release commercial films. Urban's Kineto Company of America edited, processed, and printed the CPI's films, including Pershing’s Crusaders, America’s Answer, and Under Four Flags. Similar to Britain, American interest in feature-length films waned in favor of newsreels and shorts. This also proved to be more profitable though even American audiences came to prefer British war films.

Charlie Chaplin produced and starred in multiple pro-US propaganda films. One film, Zepped, which contains the only known scenes of a Zeppelin bombing raid over London, was designed to be used on a morale mission for the troops in Egypt and to defuse the terror inspired by the frequent Zeppelin raids. In 1918, Chaplin made, at his own expense, The Bond, and produced short clips in which he beat up Kaiser Wilhelm with a hammer bearing the inscription "War Bonds".

The 1915 film The German Side of the War was one of the only American films to show the German perspective of the war. At the theater lines stretched around the block; the screenings were received with such enthusiasm that would-be moviegoers resorted to purchasing tickets from scalpers.

The use of film by the U.S. Signal Corps and the Committee on Public Information during World War I features in the documentary "Mobilizing Movies!" (2017).

== Germany ==
Germany was one of the first nations to recognize and effectively mobilize the film industry towards national causes. The German industry expanded during World War I largely due to the isolation that resulted from the government's 1916 ban on most foreign films, prior to which it imported films, especially from Denmark. Building upon a history in which Kaiser Wilhelm II was the biggest movie star of the era, the Chief of Staff of the German army, General Ludendorff, saw film as an effective war weapon and used the fledgling Universum Film Aktiengesellschaft, better known as Ufa, to create pro-German films. By the end of the war, the booming industry, which expanded from 25 to 130 production companies from 1914 to 1918, was consolidated into larger companies, primarily under Ufa. Germany also launched a secret film campaign in the United States. In an effort to maintain U.S. neutrality and spread pro-German sentiments, German officials set up the American Correspondent Film Company. As a front man for this organization, photographer Albert K. Dawson was attached to the German and Austrian army. Dawson was among the most active and daring film correspondents in the Great War.

== France ==
Many resources were redirected to support the fighting, leading to a decline in French film production during the war. Additionally, most of the films shown in France during the war were American. The French war films often depicted the disputed territory, Alsace-Lorraine, which was a major victim of Weimar hostilities. The many depictions of heroic and suffering women and children led to the territory's representation as a beautiful female victim, abused by Germanic Huns, silently crying for national redemption.

== Films ==
- The Little American (1917)
- Heldenkampf in Schnee und Eis (1917)
- The Unbeliever (1918)
- My Four Years in Germany (1918)
- Hearts of the World (1918)
- Shoulder Arms (1918)
