= Campbell Stuart =

Canadian businessman (1885–1972)

Lieutenant-Colonel Sir Campbell Stuart GCMG KBE KStJ
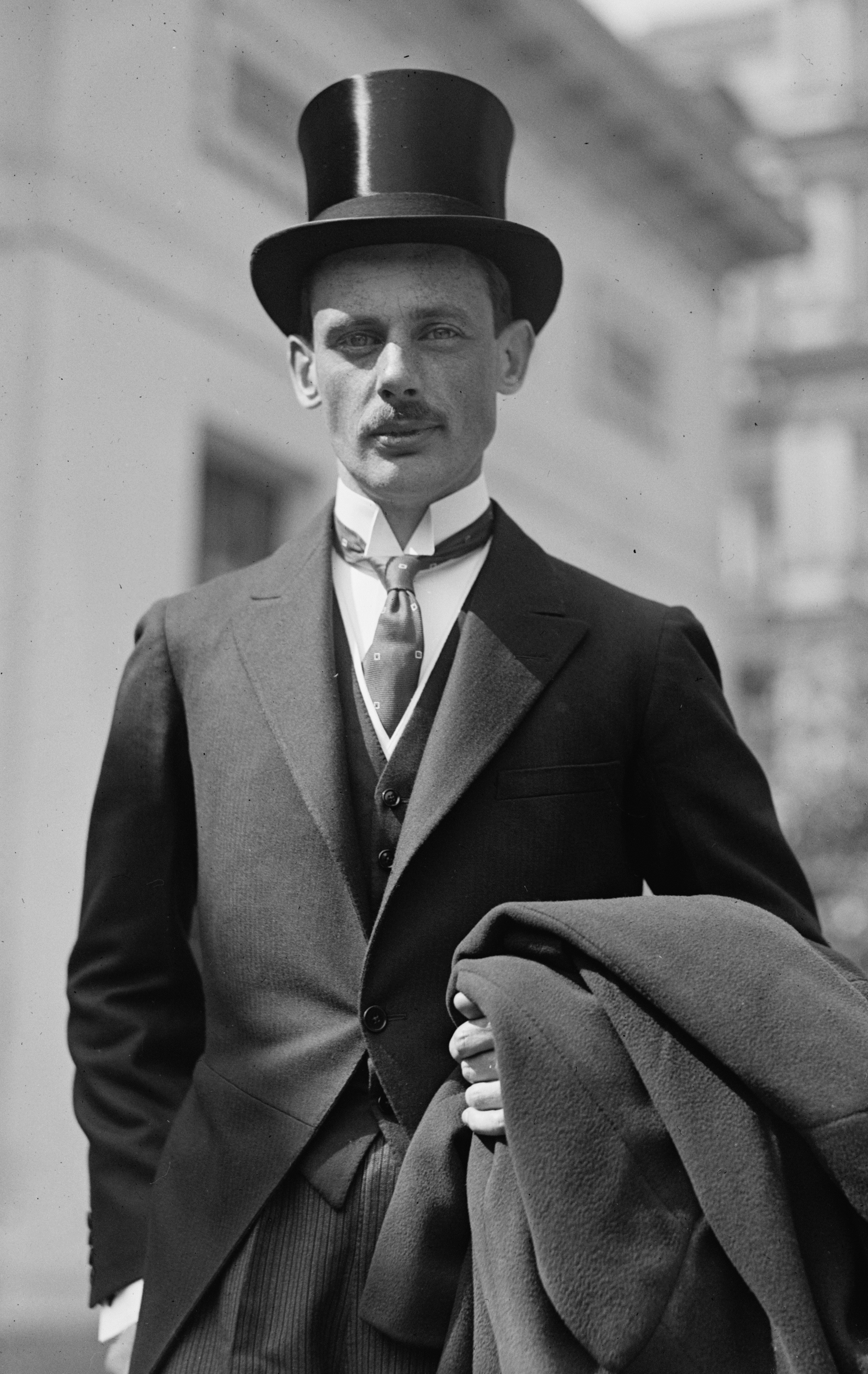
- Stuart in 1923
- Born: 5 July 1885; Montreal, Canada
- Died: 14 September 1972 (aged 87); Highgate, London, United Kingdom
- Occupation: Newspaper Manager
- Employer: The Times

Sir Campbell Arthur Stuart (5 July 1885 – 14 September 1972) was a Canadian newspaper magnate. He ran propaganda operations for the British during both World Wars, and was one of the co-founders of the Special Operations Executive (SOE).

== Early life ==
Campbell Arthur Stuart was born in 1885 in Montreal, Canada to stockbroker Ernest Henry Stuart and Letitia Mary S. Brydges. He was descended from British Empire loyalists who moved to Canada from the United States of America following the American War of Independence.

== First World War ==
In 1915, Stuart raised an Irish-Canadian regiment drawn from both the Protestant and Roman Catholic communities in Quebec. En route to France he arranged for the officers and men of the regiment to march through Ireland as a show of solidarity.

The effect of this effort to build a cross denominational consensus caught the attention of Canadian Prime Minister Sir Robert Borden. Borden arranged for Stuart to travel to the Vatican City to seek an audience with Pope Benedict XV and raise Papal interest in French Canada's war effort. Vatican officials were reportedly astonished at the speed in which he obtained his audience.

After his Vatican mission, Borden dispatched Stuart to Washington D.C. as Assistant Military Attaché. This made Stuart the first Canadian to be officially appointed to the British Diplomatic Service. Lord Northcliffe arrived in the United States and had Stuart transferred to his mission as Military Secretary in New York City. He then moved with Northcliffe to London to work in a propaganda role as Deputy Director of Propaganda in Enemy Countries.

At the end of the First World War, Campbell was a Lieutenant-Colonel and had been Mentioned in Dispatches.

== Inter War Years ==
=== Newspapers ===
Stuart was demobilized in 1920 and Northcliffe offered to make him a managing director of The Times (a role which included supervision of editorial staff and news services). The following year Stuart was also made an managing editor at the Daily Mail.

Northcliffe said of Stuart -

Campbell is the only person I have yet found who understands the harmonising of my newspapers

— Lord Northcliffe

After Northcliffe's death in 1922, Stuart was instrumental in negotiations which saw a controlling interest in The Times moving to Major Astor. Stuart was an active member of The Times board as a director for thirty-seven years until 1960.

=== Canadian Historical Society ===
In 1924, Stuart was a leading participant in the foundation of the Canadian Historical Society in France. He arranged for the society to be launched with a meal at the Palace of Versailles in the Galerie des Batailles. In order to secure use of the palace, Stuart insured the building and contents with Lloyd's of London. The meal was attended by descendants of the English and French families who had been prominent in Canadian history as well as members of the French and Canadian governments. Stuart served on the society's committee until 1958, including 10 years as chairman.

=== Communications Work ===
In 1928, Stuart served as the Canadian representative at the Imperial Wireless Cables Conference. Then in 1933 he was elected chairman of the Imperial Communications Advisory Committee.

=== Other Organisations ===
Further to his other roles Stuart also served on the committees of the following groups -

- Beit Foundation for Scientific Research
- Wolfe Memorial Committee (at Greenwich, London)
- Quebec House Committee (at Westerham)
- Hudson's Bay Record Society
- King George's Jubilee Trust and Fields Foundation

== Second World War ==
With the outbreak of the Second World War, Stuart was appointed Director of Propaganda in Enemy Countries. He recruited to his section Ray Shaw of The Times to be his deputy, Sir Dallas Brooks and Noël Coward before leaving his post in 1940.

== Honours ==
He was appointed Knight Commander of the Order of the British Empire in the 1918 New Year Honours and Knight Grand Cross of the Order of St Michael and St George in 1939. Stuart was the Honorary Vice-President of the Champlain Society from 1964 until his death in 1972.

Coat of arms of Campbell Stuart
Notes Granted 3 April 1922 by Sir Nevile Rodwell Wilkinson, Ulster King of Arms. Crest On a wreath of the colours a demi-lion rampant issuant from a fasces in fess Or and grasping in the dexter paw a thistle slipped Proper. Escutcheon Or a fess chequy Argent and Azure cotised of the third all within a bordure pean. Motto Justitiae Propositique Tenax

== Personal life ==
Stuart never married and enjoyed entertaining with his mother acting as hostess. The Times (15 Sept. 1972) noted -

His tall, lean figure and eager, expressive face, quick to break into smiles, were familiar in Embassies and drawing-rooms in Mayfair and in Montreal, Cape Town and other centres of the old Empire

— The Times, 15 Sept. 1972

He would entertain at his home, 4 The Grove, Highgate, London. It was at his home where he died on 14 September 1972.

In 1946, when a Director of The Times newspaper, he was the executor and beneficiary of the will of Captain Richard James Herbert Shaw, a member of the editorial staff of The Times with whom he shared the same address, 7 Royal Crescent, Bath, Somerset.

Stuart was a member of the Bath and County Club.

== See also ==
- British anti-invasion preparations of World War II#Deception and disinformation
- Special Operations Executive#History
