= Pyruvate phosphate dikinase regulatory protein =

Pyruvate phosphate dikinase regulatory protein may refer to:

- (Pyruvate, phosphate dikinase)-phosphate phosphotransferase, an enzyme
- (Pyruvate, phosphate dikinase) kinase, an enzyme
