= Selenide, water dikinase =

Enzyme

selenide, water dikinase

Identifiers
- EC no.: 2.7.9.3

Databases
- IntEnz: IntEnz view
- BRENDA: BRENDA entry
- ExPASy: NiceZyme view
- KEGG: KEGG entry
- MetaCyc: metabolic pathway
- PRIAM: profile
- PDB structures: RCSB PDB PDBe PDBsum
- Gene Ontology: AmiGO / QuickGO
Search
- PMC: articles
- PubMed: articles
- NCBI: proteins

In enzymology, a selenide, water dikinase (EC 2.7.9.3) is an enzyme that catalyzes the chemical reaction

ATP + selenide + H_{2}O $\rightleftharpoons$ AMP + selenophosphate + phosphate

The 3 substrates of this enzyme are ATP, selenide, and H_{2}O, whereas its 3 products are AMP, selenophosphate, and phosphate.

This enzyme belongs to the family of transferases, to be specific, those transferring phosphorus-containing groups (phosphotransferases) with paired acceptors (dikinases). The systematic name of this enzyme class is ATP:selenide, water phosphotransferase. This enzyme is also called selenophosphate synthetase. This enzyme participates in selenoamino acid metabolism.

== Evolution ==
Vertebrates including humans carry two versions of this enzyme, with one (SEPHS2) being a selenoprotein and the other (SEPHS1) replacing it with a threonine, though still with a vestigial SECIS element. Analysis of animal versions of this enzyme show that the original animal version is a selenoprotein, with SEPHS1 arising later through gene duplication.

Among prokaryotes, most bacteria have a version with cystine instad of selenocystine, suggesting that this may be the ancestral state (which would avoid the chicken-and-egg problem). Some have two versions, one with Sec and the other with Cys. Archaea mostly have the Sec version.
