= Inositol 3-kinase =

Enzyme

Identifiers
- EC no.: 2.7.1.64
- CAS no.: 37278-07-2

Databases
- IntEnz: IntEnz view
- BRENDA: BRENDA entry
- ExPASy: NiceZyme view
- KEGG: KEGG entry
- MetaCyc: metabolic pathway
- PRIAM: profile
- PDB structures: RCSB PDB PDBe PDBsum
- Gene Ontology: AmiGO / QuickGO
Search
- PMC: articles
- PubMed: articles
- NCBI: proteins

Inositol 3-kinase (EC 2.7.1.64) is an enzyme that catalyzes the chemical reaction

ATP +
myo-inositol
ADP +
inositol 3-phosphate

The enzyme, which is found in plants, animals, and microbes converts myo-inositol to inositol 3-phosphate (1D-myo-inositol 3-phosphate) by transferring a phosphate group from the cofactor, adenosine triphosphate (ATP), which is converted to adenosine diphosphate (ADP).

This enzyme is a transferase, specifically one transferring phosphorus-containing groups (phosphotransferases) with an alcohol group as acceptor. The systematic name of this enzyme class is ATP:myo-inositol 1-phosphotransferase. Other names in common use include inositol-1-kinase (phosphorylating), myoinositol kinase, and myo-inositol 1-kinase.
