= Diphosphoinositol-pentakisphosphate kinase =

Identifiers
- EC no.: 2.7.4.24

Databases
- BRENDA: enzyme data
- ExPASy: NiceZyme view
- KEGG: enzyme entry
- MetaCyc: metabolic pathway
- Rhea: reactions
- PDB structures: RCSB PDB PDBe PDBsum
Search
- PMC: articles
- PubMed: articles
- NCBI: proteins

In enzymology, a diphosphoinositol-pentakisphosphate kinase (EC 2.7.4.24) is an enzyme that catalyzes the chemical reaction

ATP + 1D-myo-inositol 5-diphosphate pentakisphosphate $\rightleftharpoons$ ADP + 1D-myo-inositol bisdiphosphate tetrakisphosphate (isomeric configuration unknown)

Thus, the two substrates of this enzyme are ATP and 1D-myo-inositol 5-diphosphate pentakisphosphate, whereas its 3 products are ADP, 1D-myo-inositol bisdiphosphate tetrakisphosphate and (isomeric configuration unknown).

This enzyme belongs to the family of transferases, specifically those transferring phosphorus-containing groups (phosphotransferases) with a phosphate group as acceptor. The systematic name of this enzyme class is ATP:1D-myo-inositol-5-diphosphate-pentakisphosphate phosphotransferase. Other names in common use include PP-IP5 kinase, diphosphoinositol pentakisphosphate kinase, and ATP:5-diphospho-1D-myo-inositol-pentakisphosphate phosphotransferase.
