= Tagatose-6-phosphate kinase =

Enzyme

tagatose-6-phosphate kinase

Identifiers
- EC no.: 2.7.1.144
- CAS no.: 39434-00-9

Databases
- IntEnz: IntEnz view
- BRENDA: BRENDA entry
- ExPASy: NiceZyme view
- KEGG: KEGG entry
- MetaCyc: metabolic pathway
- PRIAM: profile
- PDB structures: RCSB PDB PDBe PDBsum
- Gene Ontology: AmiGO / QuickGO
Search
- PMC: articles
- PubMed: articles
- NCBI: proteins

In enzymology, a tagatose-6-phosphate kinase (EC 2.7.1.144) is an enzyme that catalyzes the chemical reaction

ATP + D-tagatose 6-phosphate $\rightleftharpoons$ ADP + D-tagatose 1,6-bisphosphate

Thus, the two substrates of this enzyme are ATP and D-tagatose 6-phosphate, whereas its two products are ADP and D-tagatose 1,6-bisphosphate.

This enzyme belongs to the phosphofructokinase B (PfkB) or Ribokinase family of sugar kinases, specifically those transferring phosphorus-containing groups (phosphotransferases) with an alcohol group as acceptor. The systematic name of this enzyme class is ATP:D-tagatose-6-phosphate 1-phosphotransferase. The members of the PfkB/RK family are identified by the presence of three conserved sequence motifs and their enzymatic activity generally shows a dependence on the presence of pentavalent ions. Pentavalent ions dependency is a conserved property of adenosine kinase from diverse sources: identification of a novel motif implicated in phosphate and magnesium ion binding and substrate inhibition. This enzyme participates in galactose metabolism.

== Structural studies ==
As of late 2007, five structures have been solved for this class of enzymes, with PDB accession codes 2AWD, 2F02, 2JG1, 2JGV, and 2Q5R.
