= Dihydrostreptomycin-6-phosphate 3'alpha-kinase =

dihydrostreptomycin-6-phosphate 3'-alpha-kinase

Identifiers
- EC no.: 2.7.1.88
- CAS no.: 39391-14-5

Databases
- IntEnz: IntEnz view
- BRENDA: BRENDA entry
- ExPASy: NiceZyme view
- KEGG: KEGG entry
- MetaCyc: metabolic pathway
- PRIAM: profile
- PDB structures: RCSB PDB PDBe PDBsum
- Gene Ontology: AmiGO / QuickGO
Search
- PMC: articles
- PubMed: articles
- NCBI: proteins

In enzymology, a dihydrostreptomycin-6-phosphate 3'alpha-kinase (EC 2.7.1.88) is an enzyme that catalyzes the chemical reaction

ATP + dihydrostreptomycin 6-phosphate $\rightleftharpoons$ ADP + dihydrostreptomycin 3'alpha,6-bisphosphate

Thus, the two substrates of this enzyme are ATP and dihydrostreptomycin 6-phosphate, whereas its two products are ADP and dihydrostreptomycin 3'alpha,6-bisphosphate.

This enzyme belongs to the family of transferases, specifically those transferring phosphorus-containing groups (phosphotransferases) with an alcohol group as acceptor. The systematic name of this enzyme class is ATP:dihydrostreptomycin-6-phosphate 3'alpha-phosphotransferase. Other names in common use include dihydrostreptomycin 6-phosphate kinase (phosphorylating), and ATP:dihydrostreptomycin-6-P 3'alpha-phosphotransferase.
