= Pyruvate, phosphate dikinase =

pyruvate, phosphate dikinase

Identifiers
- EC no.: 2.7.9.1
- CAS no.: 9027-40-1

Databases
- BRENDA: enzyme data
- ExPASy: NiceZyme view
- KEGG: enzyme entry
- MetaCyc: metabolic pathway
- Rhea: reactions
- PDB structures: RCSB PDB PDBe PDBsum
- Gene Ontology: AmiGO / QuickGO
Search
- PMC: articles
- PubMed: articles
- NCBI: proteins

Pyruvate, phosphate dikinase
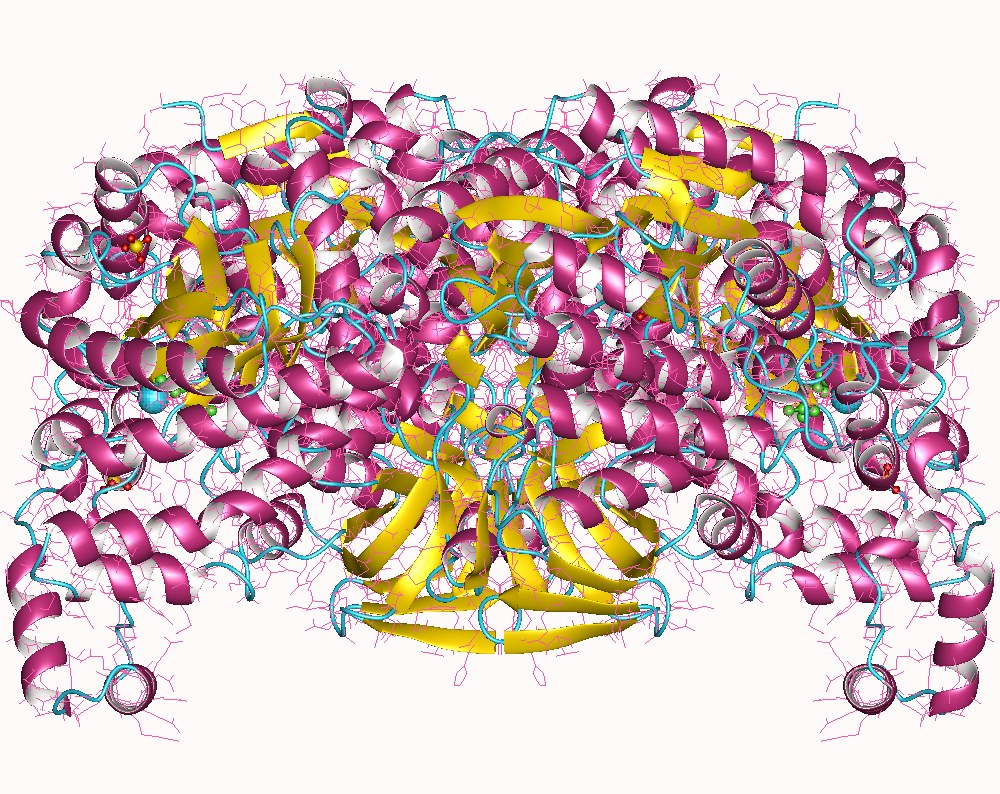
- Pyruvate phosphate dikinase dimer, Clostridium symbiosum (PDB: 1KC7)

Identifiers
- Symbol: PPDK
- InterPro: IPR010121
Available protein structures:
- PDB: IPR010121
- AlphaFold: IPR010121
- See domains below.

The three states of pyruvate, phosphate dikinase (unphosphorylated, monophosphorylated, and diphosphorylated) as it converts pyruvate to phosphoenolpyruvate (PEP). P_{i} = phosphate group. E-His = histidine residue of the enzyme.

Pyruvate, phosphate dikinase, or PPDK (EC 2.7.9.1) is an enzyme in the family of transferases that catalyzes the chemical reaction

ATP + pyruvate + phosphate $\rightleftharpoons$ AMP + phosphoenolpyruvate + diphosphate

This enzyme has been studied primarily in plants, but it has been studied in some bacteria as well. It is a key enzyme in gluconeogenesis and photosynthesis that is responsible for reversing the reaction performed by pyruvate kinase in Embden-Meyerhof-Parnas glycolysis. It should not be confused with pyruvate, water dikinase.

It belongs to the family of transferases, to be specific, those transferring phosphorus-containing groups (phosphotransferases) with paired acceptors (dikinases). This enzyme participates in pyruvate metabolism and carbon fixation.

== Nomenclature ==
The systematic name of this enzyme class is ATP:pyruvate, phosphate phosphotransferase. Other names in common use include pyruvate, orthophosphate dikinase, pyruvate-phosphate dikinase (phosphorylating), pyruvate phosphate dikinase, pyruvate-inorganic phosphate dikinase, pyruvate-phosphate dikinase, pyruvate-phosphate ligase, pyruvic-phosphate dikinase, pyruvic-phosphate ligase, pyruvate, Pi dikinase, and PPDK.

== Reaction mechanism ==
PPDK catalyses the conversion of pyruvate to phosphoenolpyruvate (PEP), consuming 1 molecule of ATP, and producing one molecule of AMP in the process. The mechanism consists of 3 reversible reactions:

1. The enzyme PPDK binds to ATP, to produce AMP and a diphosphorylated PPDK.
2. The diphosphorylated PPDK binds to inorganic phosphate, producing diphosphate and (mono)phosphorylated PPDK.
3. Phosphorylated PPDK binds to pyruvate, producing phosphoenolpyruvate, and regenerating PPDK.

The reaction is similar to the reaction catalysed by pyruvate kinase, which also converts pyruvate to PEP. However, pyruvate kinase catalyses an irreversible reaction, and does not consume ATP. By contrast, PPDK catalyses a reversible reaction, and consumes 1 molecule of ATP for each molecule of pyruvate converted.

Currently, the details of each mechanistic step is unknown

== Structure ==
In its active form, PPDK is a homotetramer with subunits about 95 kDa

There are two different reaction centres about 45 Angstroms apart, in which different substrates bind. The nucleotide (ATP) binding site is on the N-terminus, has 240 amino acids, and a characteristic ATP-grasp. The pyruvate/PEP binding site is on the C-terminus, has 340 amino acids, and an α/β-barrel fold. There is also a central domain, which contains His455, the primary residue responsible for catalysis. His455 is the phosphoryl acceptor or donor residue. The structure of the enzyme suggests that the His455 arm undergoes a swivelling motion to shuttle a phosphoryl group between the two reaction centres. During this swivelling, the central domain rotates at least 92 degrees, and translates 0.5 Angstroms.

Studies of crystal structures of PPDK show that the central domain is located in different proximity to the two other domains depending on the source of the enzyme. In maize, it is closer to the C-terminal, while in Clostridium symbiosum, it is closer to the N-terminal.

Research has shown that the PPDK binding mechanisms are similar to that of D-Ala-D-Ala ligase and pyruvate kinase. In particular, PPDK is very similar to pyruvate kinase, which also catalyses the conversion of pyruvate to phosphoenolpyruvate; however, it does so without a phosphorylated-enzyme intermediate. Though their amino acid sequences are different, residues key to catalysis are preserved in both enzymes. Point-mutagenesis experiments have shown that catalytic residues include Arg561, Arg617, Glu745, Asn768, and Cys831 (numbering relative to the C, symbiosum protein, PDB: 1KBL, 1KC7).

Protein domain infoboxes

Pyruvate phosphate dikinase, N-terminal ATP-grasp

Identifiers
- Symbol: PPDK_N
- Pfam: PF01326
- InterPro: IPR002192
- CATH: 1vbg
- SCOP2: d1vbga3 / SCOPe / SUPFAM
Available protein structures:
- PDB: IPR002192 PF01326 (ECOD; PDBsum)
- AlphaFold: IPR002192; PF01326
- CATH domains 1vbgA01-1vbgA04

PEP-utilizing enzyme, Central motile domain

Identifiers
- Symbol: PEP-utilizers
- Pfam: PF00391
- InterPro: IPR008279
- PROSITE: PS00370
- CATH: 1vbgA05
- SCOP2: d1vbga2 / SCOPe / SUPFAM
Available protein structures:
- PDB: IPR008279 PF00391 (ECOD; PDBsum)
- AlphaFold: IPR008279; PF00391

PEP-utilizing enzyme, C-terminal PEP-binding

Identifiers
- Symbol: PEP-utilizers_C
- Pfam: PF02896
- InterPro: IPR000121
- PROSITE: PS00742
- CATH: 1vbgA06
- SCOP2: d1vbga1 / SCOPe / SUPFAM
Available protein structures:
- PDB: IPR000121 PF02896 (ECOD; PDBsum)
- AlphaFold: IPR000121; PF02896

== Biological function and evolution ==
PPDK is used in the C4 pathway, to improve the efficiency of carbon dioxide fixation. In environments where there is a lot of light, the rate of photosynthesis in plants is limited by the rate of carbon dioxide (CO_{2}) uptake. This can be improved by using a series of chemical reactions to transport CO_{2} from mesophyll cells (which are located on the outside of a leaf) to bundle sheath cells (which are located inside the cells). PPDK converts pyruvate to PEP, which reacts with CO_{2} to produce oxaloacetate. When CO_{2} is released in the bundle sheath cells, pyruvate is regenerated, and the cycle continues.

Though the reaction catalysed by PPDK is reversible, PEP is favoured as the product in biological conditions. This is due to the basic pH in the stroma, where the reaction occurs, as well as high concentrations of adenylate kinase and pyrophosphatase. Because these two enzymes catalyse exergonic reactions involving AMP, and disphosphate, respectively, they drive the PPDK-catalysed reaction forward. Because PPDK consumes ATP, the C4 pathway is unfavourable for plants in environments with little access to light, as they are unable to produce large quantities of ATP.

PPDK is highly abundant in C4 leaves, comprising up to 10% of total protein. Research has shown that the enzyme is about 96% identical in different species of plants. Hybridization experiments revealed that the genetic differences correlate with the extent to which the plants perform the C4 pathway – the uncommon sequences exist in plants which also display C3 characteristics. PPDK is also found in small quantities in C3 plants. Evolutionary history suggests that it once had a role in glycolysis like the similar pyruvate kinase, and eventually evolved into the C4 pathway.

Besides plants, PPDK is also found in the parasitic amoeba Entamoeba histolytica (P37213) and the bacteria Clostridium symbiosum (P22983; as well as other bacteria). In those two organisms PPDK functions similarly to (and sometimes in place of) pyruvate kinase, catalyzing the reaction in the ATP-producing direction as a part of glycolysis. Inhibitors for the Entamoeba PPDK have been proposed as amebicides against this organism.

== Regulation ==
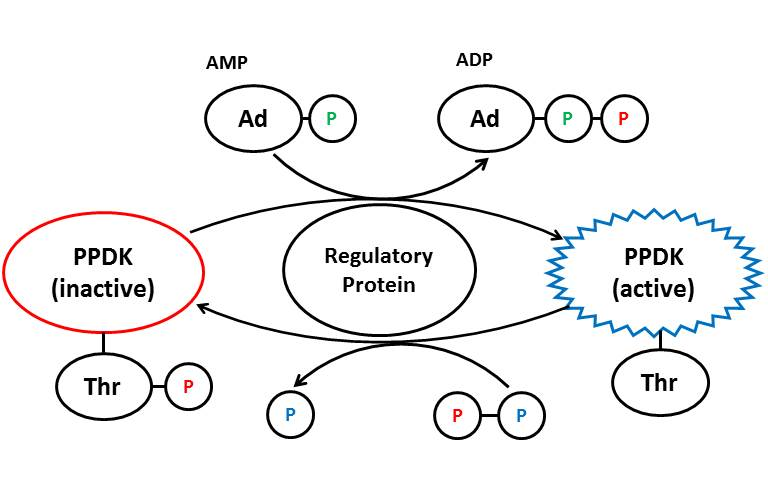
PPDK is inactivated when PPDK Regulatory Protein (PDRP) phosphorylates Thr456. PDRP both activates and inactivates PPDK.

Plant PPDK is regulated by the pyruvate, phosphate dikinase regulatory protein (PDRP). When levels of light are high, PDRP dephosphorylates Thr456 on PPDK using AMP, thus activating the enzyme. PDRP deactivates PPDK by phosphorylating the same threonine residue, using diphosphate. PDRP is a unique regulator because it catalyses both activation and deactivation of PPDK, through two different mechanisms.

Research on maize PPDK suggests that introns, terminator sequences, and perhaps other enhancer sequences, act cooperatively to increase the level of functional and stable mRNA. PPDK cDNA was expressed only slightly in transgenic rice, compared to intact DNA which saw significant expression.

== Structural studies ==
As of early 2018, 14 structures have been solved for this class of enzymes, with PDB accession codes PDB: 1DIK, PDB: 1GGO, PDB: 1H6Z, PDB: 1JDE, PDB: 1KBL, PDB: 1KC7, PDB: 1VBG, PDB: 1VBH, PDB: 2DIK, PDB: 2FM4, PDB: 5JVJ, PDB: 5JVL, PDB: 5JVN, PDB: 5LU4.
