= Aspergillus unguis =

Scientific classification
- Domain: Eukaryota
- Kingdom: Fungi
- Division: Ascomycota
- Class: Eurotiomycetes
- Order: Eurotiales
- Family: Aspergillaceae
- Genus: Aspergillus
- Species: A. unguis

Binomial name
- Aspergillus unguis Weill & L.Gaudin (1935)

Synonyms
- Sterigmatocystis unguis Weill & L.Gaudin (1918); Aspergillus laokiashanensis Y.K.Shih (1936); Aspergillus mellinus Novobr. (1972); Emericella unguis Malloch & Cain (1972)

Species of fungus

Aspergillus unguis is a species of fungus in the genus Aspergillus, and the asexual state (anamorph) of Emericella unguis. Aspergillus unguis is a filamentous soil-borne fungus found on decomposing plant matter and other moist substrates including with building materials and household dust. Aspergillus unguis occurs mainly in tropical and subtropical soils but has also been isolated from various marine and aquatic habitats. The species was first isolated in 1935 by Weill and L. Gaudin. Historically, A. unguis was assigned to the A. nidulans group, a common group of soil-borne fungi due to the resemblance of its ascospores and cleistothecia to those of Emericella nidulans. Aspergillus unguis is distinctive, however, in possessing spicular hyphae. A number of synonyms have been collapsed into this species, including Sterigmatocystis unguis, Aspergillus laokiashanensis and Aspergillus mellinus.

== Growth and morphology ==
Colonies typically reach up to 2 cm (0.8 in) in diameter at 10 days incubation, growing optimally at 30 °C (86 °F). A number of growth media are suitable for the cultivation of this species, including Sabouraud maltose agar, Czapek's agar, and Raulin's agar. The colonies of A. unguis are first white in colour, becoming greenish or chrome green in the centre, and ultimately a dull brown colour similar to chocolate. The dark colour is due to the presence of melanin or melanin like-pigments within the cell wall. This dark brown colouration is unique to the species and has caused some researchers to include it in the dematiaceous fungi, a group of unrelated, darkly coloured moulds that includes some serious opportunistic pathogens of humans. Despite its outward similarity to the dematiaceous fungi, the latter group conventionally excludes members of the order Eurotiales.

The conidiophoress are smooth-walled, non-septate, reaching 45–65 μm in length. The mature sporulating heads are 250–300 μm in diameter, and columnar. The conidiophores terminate in hemispherical vesicles 9–12 μm wide, which become covered by primary and secondary metulae giving rise to phialides. The conidia are spherical in shape, roughly 3 μm in diameter and develop brownish vein-like structures on the spore walls over time. Conidia are borne in columns at the tips of aspergilloid conidiophores. The spicular hyphae of A. unguis are aseptate and become brown in colour, thick-walled and irregularly roughened and tapering with blunt apex. They reach a length of 1000 μm or greater.

Aspergillus unguis has been cultivated on both Czapek yeast extract agar (CYA) plates and Malt Extract Agar Oxoid (MEAOX) plates. The growth morphology of the colonies can be seen in the pictures below.

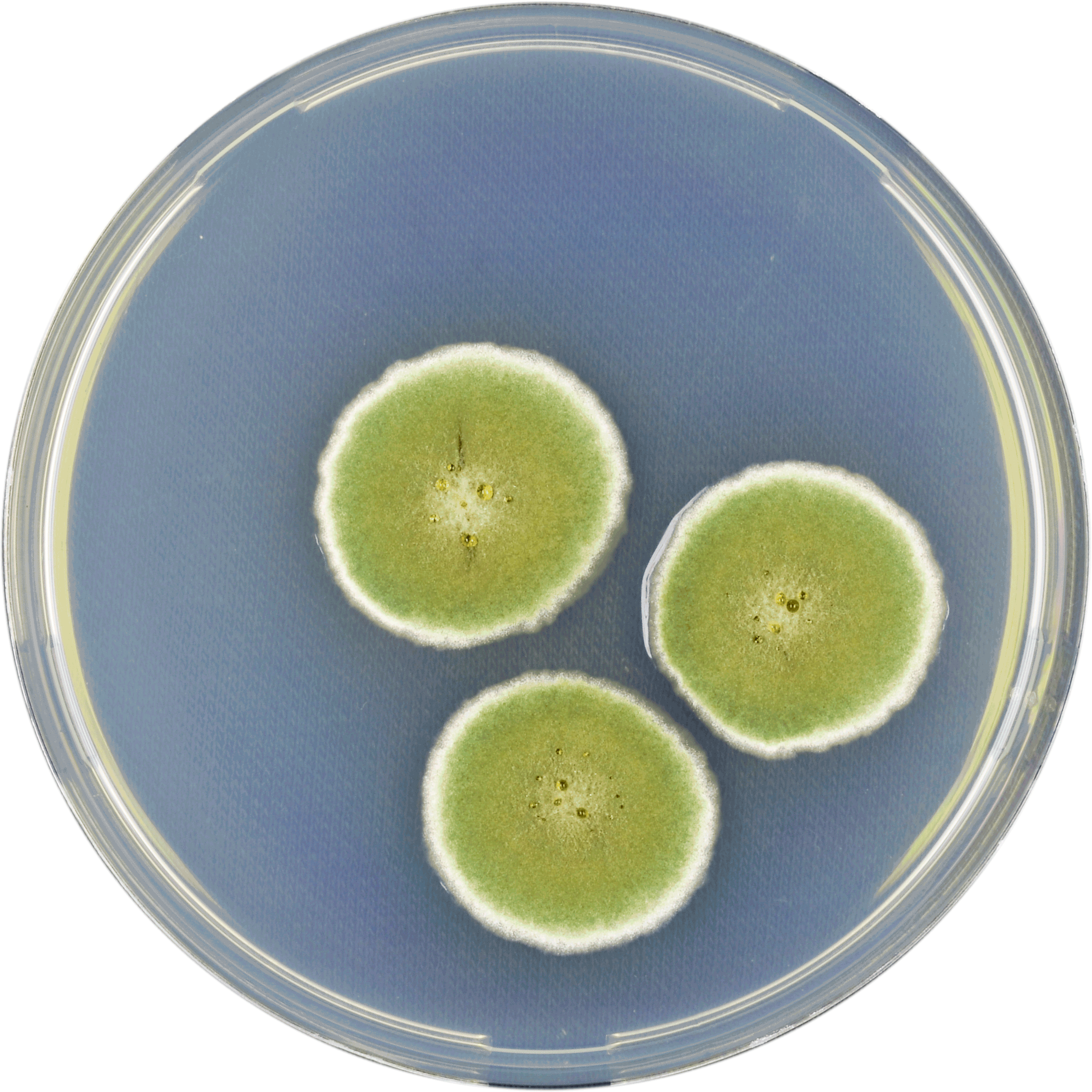
Aspergillus unguis growing on CYA plate

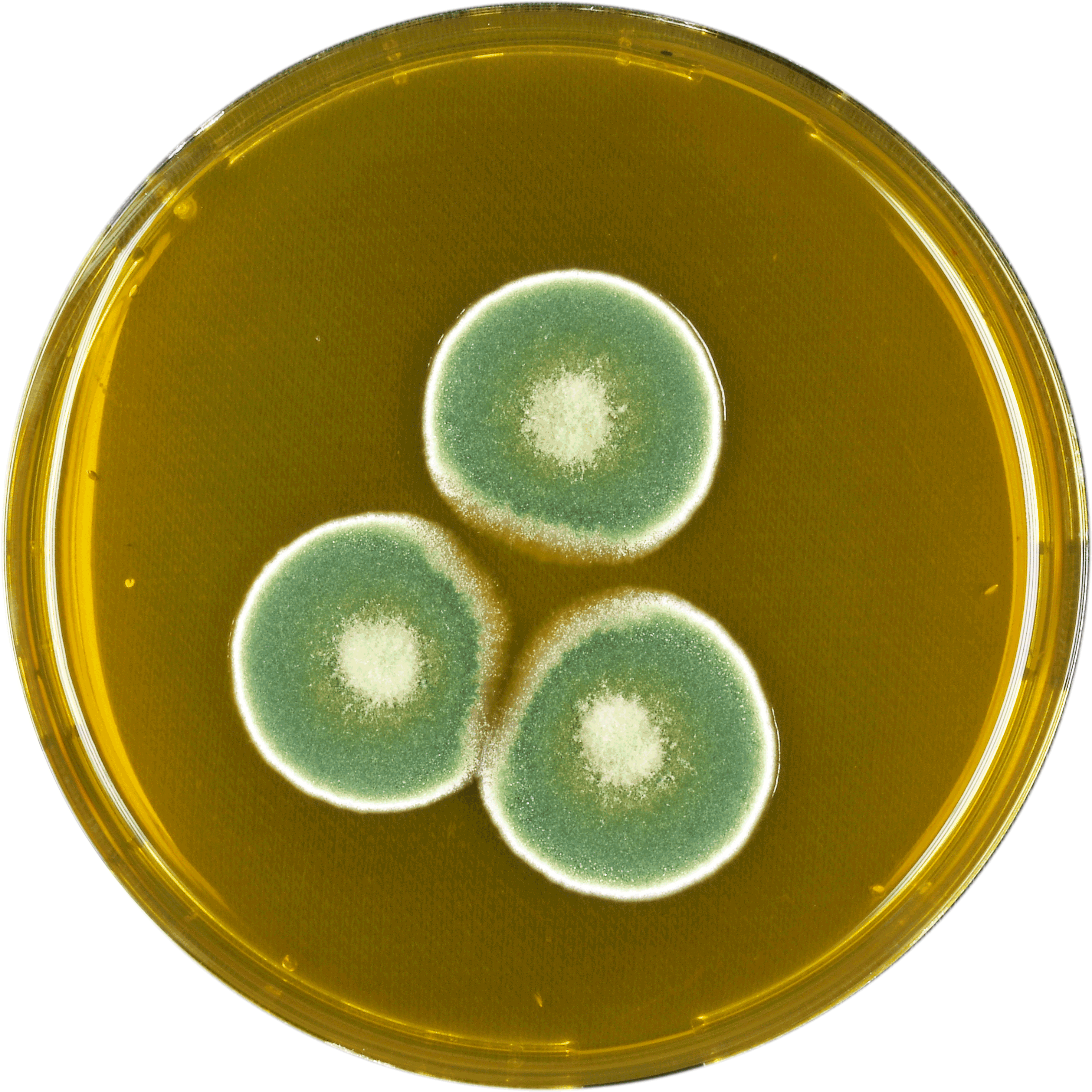
Aspergillus unguis growing on MEAOX plate

== Ecology ==
Aspergillus unguis is a soil-dwelling fungus that prefers high water activity (a_{w}).

=== Human disease ===
Disease of the nails and skin caused by A. unguis has been reported. This species was one of two most common fungi encountered in the homes of asthmatic children in Detroit, Michigan, reported from 72% of homes. It has also been reported as a colonist of water-damaged construction materials in Finland, where it was found to produce the mycotoxin, sterigmatocystin, a potent carcinogen and mutagen.

== Metabolites ==
Production of beta-glucosidases is well known in members of the genus Aspergillus; however, only a few species can produce glucose-tolerant isoforms. Beta-glucosidases produced by A. unguis are characteristically highly glucose-tolerant. For this reason, the fungus has been investigated industrially for use in the hydrolysis of cellulose hydrolysis and biomass conversion (cellulose to glucose to fuel ethanol).

Four bioactive, chlorinated depsidones have been isolated from strains of this species obtained from seaweed collected off the coasts of China and Thailand. These compounds exhibited potent inhibitory effects against methicillin-resistant Staphylococcus aureus (MRSA), brine shrimp larvae (test for compound cytotoxicity and pesticide-ability) and the human lung tumor line A-549. No activity was found against E. coli strain AB1157+; however, some depsidones exhibited selective bioactivity on strain AB3027-. Some compounds introduced DNA damage. One depsidone showed significant anti-proliferatory activity on human cancer cells. Folipastatin, another depsidone, is inhibitory to phospholipase A_{2}, an important enzyme in the lipolysis pathway that also is related to the expression of inflammatory mediators such as arachidonic acid. Exposure of hypertensive rats to this compound produced an anti-inflammatory effect with mild edema at the injection site but without an increase in blood pressure edemas on the hypertensive rats.

Guisinol was isolated from a strain of the teleomorph Emericella unguis derived from a mollusc collected from coastal Venezuela. This compound also inhibits the growth of MRSA in vitro. The metabolite unguinol, produced uniquely by A. unguis, is a growth promoter specific to monogastric animals such as chickens. It also been investigated as a potential herbicide due to its ability to selectively inhibit pyruvate, phosphate dikinase (PPDK), a key enzyme in gluconeogenesis and photosynthesis. Other metabolites produced by the fungus include sterigmatocystin, unguisin A, unguisin B and unguisin C.

== Genome sequencing ==
In 2016, the genome of A. unguis was sequenced as a part of the Aspergillus whole-genome sequencing project - a project dedicated to performing whole-genome sequencing of all members of the genus Aspergillus. The genome assembly size was 26.06 Mbp.
