= Alkylglycerone kinase =

alkylglycerone kinase

Identifiers
- EC no.: 2.7.1.84
- CAS no.: 52227-80-2

Databases
- IntEnz: IntEnz view
- BRENDA: BRENDA entry
- ExPASy: NiceZyme view
- KEGG: KEGG entry
- MetaCyc: metabolic pathway
- PRIAM: profile
- PDB structures: RCSB PDB PDBe PDBsum
- Gene Ontology: AmiGO / QuickGO
Search
- PMC: articles
- PubMed: articles
- NCBI: proteins

In enzymology, an alkylglycerone kinase (EC 2.7.1.84) is an enzyme that catalyzes the chemical reaction

ATP + O-alkylglycerone $\rightleftharpoons$ ADP + O-alkylglycerone phosphate

Thus, the two substrates of this enzyme are ATP and O-alkylglycerone, whereas its two products are ADP and O-alkylglycerone phosphate.

This enzyme belongs to the family of transferases, specifically those transferring phosphorus-containing groups (phosphotransferases) with an alcohol group as acceptor. The systematic name of this enzyme class is ATP:O-alkylglycerone phosphotransferase. Other names in common use include alkyldihydroxyacetone kinase (phosphorylating), and alkyldihydroxyacetone kinase.
