= Hamamelose kinase =

Enzyme

hamamelose kinase

Identifiers
- EC no.: 2.7.1.102
- CAS no.: 74506-53-9

Databases
- IntEnz: IntEnz view
- BRENDA: BRENDA entry
- ExPASy: NiceZyme view
- KEGG: KEGG entry
- MetaCyc: metabolic pathway
- PRIAM: profile
- PDB structures: RCSB PDB PDBe PDBsum
- Gene Ontology: AmiGO / QuickGO
Search
- PMC: articles
- PubMed: articles
- NCBI: proteins

In enzymology, a hamamelose kinase (EC 2.7.1.102) is an enzyme that catalyzes the chemical reaction

ATP + D-hamamelose $\rightleftharpoons$ ADP + D-hamamelose 2'-phosphate

Thus, the two substrates of this enzyme are ATP and D-hamamelose, whereas its two products are ADP and D-hamamelose 2'-phosphate.

This enzyme belongs to the family of transferases, specifically those transferring phosphorus-containing groups (phosphotransferases) with an alcohol group as acceptor. The systematic name of this enzyme class is ATP:D-hamamelose 2'-phosphotransferase. Other names in common use include hamamelose kinase (phosphorylating), hamamelosekinase (ATP: hamamelose 2'-phosphotransferase), and ATP/hamamelose 2'-phosphotransferase.
