= Dikinase =

Dikinases are a category of enzymes that catalyze the chemical reaction

ATP + X + Y $\rightleftharpoons$ AMP + X-P + Y-P.

Dikinases are all phosphotransferases. Their designated EC number is 2.7.9. It is one of the smallest groups of phosphotransferases.

== Function ==
Dikinases take two phosphate groups from ATP and transfer each one to a different acceptor. This results in AMP and two different phosphorylated compounds. In most dikinases, one of the acceptors is water. In at least one dikinase (pyruvate, phosphate dikinase), one of the acceptors is inorganic phosphate, resulting in diphosphate.

For the dikinases that use water as acceptor, it has been shown that the γ-phosphate of ATP (the third, most distant phosphate) is transferred to water, whereas the β-phosphate (the middle phosphate) is transferred to the other acceptor. It has also been shown that the enzyme first phosphorylates itself (autophosphorylation). After transfer of the γ-phosphate to water, the β-phosphate is first transferred to a histidine residue on the enzyme, and later to the final acceptor.

Dikinases are commonly named as follows: first acceptor, second acceptor kinase. Examples include:

- Phosphoglucan, water dikinase,
- Selenide, water dikinase,
- Pyruvate, phosphate dikinase.

Dikinases should not be confused with diphosphotransferases (EC 2.7.6), which are phosphotransferases which act upon pyrophosphate groups.
