= Tagatose kinase =

tagatose kinase

Identifiers
- EC no.: 2.7.1.101
- CAS no.: 39434-00-9

Databases
- IntEnz: IntEnz view
- BRENDA: BRENDA entry
- ExPASy: NiceZyme view
- KEGG: KEGG entry
- MetaCyc: metabolic pathway
- PRIAM: profile
- PDB structures: RCSB PDB PDBe PDBsum
- Gene Ontology: AmiGO / QuickGO
Search
- PMC: articles
- PubMed: articles
- NCBI: proteins

In enzymology, a tagatose kinase (EC 2.7.1.101) is an enzyme that catalyzes the chemical reaction

ATP + D-tagatose $\rightleftharpoons$ ADP + D-tagatose 6-phosphate

Thus, the two substrates of this enzyme are ATP and D-tagatose, whereas its two products are ADP and D-tagatose 6-phosphate.

This enzyme belongs to the family of transferases, specifically those transferring phosphorus-containing groups (phosphotransferases) with an alcohol group as acceptor. The systematic name of this enzyme class is ATP:D-tagatose 6-phosphotransferase. Other names in common use include tagatose 6-phosphate kinase (phosphorylating), D-tagatose 6-phosphate kinase, and tagatose-6-phosphate kinase. This enzyme participates in galactose metabolism.

== Structural studies ==
As of late 2007, only one structure has been solved for this class of enzymes, with the PDB accession code 2FIQ.
