= Pyruvate, water dikinase =

Class of enzymes

pyruvate, water dikinase

Identifiers
- EC no.: 2.7.9.2
- CAS no.: 9013-09-6

Databases
- IntEnz: IntEnz view
- BRENDA: BRENDA entry
- ExPASy: NiceZyme view
- KEGG: KEGG entry
- MetaCyc: metabolic pathway
- PRIAM: profile
- PDB structures: RCSB PDB PDBe PDBsum
- Gene Ontology: AmiGO / QuickGO
Search
- PMC: articles
- PubMed: articles
- NCBI: proteins

Pyruvate, water dikinase (EC 2.7.9.2) is an enzyme that catalyzes the chemical reaction:

pyruvic acid
+ H_{2}O
ATP
AMP
ATP
AMP
phosphoenolpyruvic acid
+ P_{i}

Pyruvic acid is converted to phosphoenolpyruvic acid by action of the cofactor, adenosine triphosphate (ATP), which transfers one unit of phosphate to the enol form of the acid. Adenosine monophosphate (AMP) and inorganic phosphate are byproducts. This reaction catalyzed by pyruvate, water dikinase can run in either direction, but has a strong preference for AMP, phosphate, and phosphoenolpyruvate as substrates and typically produces ATP.

== Nomenclature ==
This enzyme is a transferase, to specifically, one transferring phosphorus-containing groups (phosphotransferases) with paired acceptors (dikinases). The systematic name of this enzyme class is ATP:pyruvate, water phosphotransferase. Other names in common use include phosphoenolpyruvate synthase, pyruvate-water dikinase (phosphorylating), PEP synthetase, PEP synthase, PEPS, phoephoenolpyruvate synthetase, phosphoenolpyruvic synthase, and phosphopyruvate synthetase. This enzyme participates in pyruvate metabolism and the citric acid cycle. It contains manganese.

== Studied organisms ==
According to the BRENDA database, pyruvate, water dikinase has been studied in nine unique bacterial and archaea species under a wide range of names. Many of the studied organisms are thermophilic or hyperthermophilic, meaning they live and function in very high temperatures in their natural environments, and have been found in hot springs, volcanos, and deep sea hydrothermal vents.

One of the most widely studied organisms for pyruvate, water dikninase is Pyrococcus furiosus. Pyrococcus furiosus is a deep sea hyperthermophilic archaea that is commonly found living in extremely hot waters around hydrothermal vents. This species is heterotrophic and anaerobic (grows and metabolizes without the presence of oxygen), and has an optimal growth temperature of 100˚C. The enzymes and proteins in this species are studied and of note because of their thermal stability. Pyrococcus furiosus organisms use the fermentation of carbohydrates and glycolysis to produce energy.

== Structure ==
As of 2023, only one structure has been solved for this class of enzymes, with the PDB accession code 2OLS. The crystalline structure from Neisseria meningitidis was computed through x-ray diffraction techniques at a resolution of 2.40 Å. Pyruvate, water dikinase in Neisseria meningitidis is 794 amino acids in length and has two active sites: at positions 422 and 752.

In Pyrococcus furiosus, the pyruvate, water dikinase enzyme has a subunit molecular mass of 92 kDa, and each subunit contains one calcium and one phosphorus atom. This enzyme has a octomeric structure, meaning that pyruvate, water dikinase in Pyrococcus furiosus is an oligomer protein consisting of eight subunits in its quaternary structure. This eight subunit protein structure might help this enzyme function at high temperatures. This enzyme comes in two protein types, one phosphorylated and one non phosphorylated version. The N terminal amino acid sequences the same in both versions, which shows these two forms are phosphorylated and non phosphorylated versions of pyruvate, water dikinase.

== Reaction pathway and biological function ==
In Pyrococcus furiosus, pyruvate, water dikinase is the enzyme that catalyzes the first step of gluconeogenesis from pyruvate in the modified Embden-Meyerhof pathway (M-EMP) and is an important ATP producing reaction in the metabolism pathway. The modified Embden-Meyerhof pathway is a glycolytic pathway that converts glucose into pyruvate and energy products for the cell. This enzyme participates in catalyzing reactions that are important for both gluconeogenesis and the reverse, glycolysis. For their metabolism, Pyrococcus furiosus uses carbon sources like maltose, cellobiose, laminarin, and starches in this sugar metabolic pathway to produce energy for the organism.

Pyruvate, water dikinase in Pyrococcus furiosus primarily catalyzes the reaction that goes from phosphoenolpyruvate and AMP to pyruvate and ATP, but can also catalyze the reverse reaction. This reaction is thought to be important because it converts AMP into usable ATP energy during this sugar M-EMP metabolism. Two sugar kinase enzymes (glucokinase and phosphofructokinase) were found in the M-EMP pathway in Pyrococcus furiosus that catalyze the reaction that used ADP and produces AMP. In order for the AMP to be usable as ATP in the cell, the pyruvate, water dikinase enzyme catalyzes the phosphate dependent formation of pyruvate reaction pathway to convert AMP to ATP. This enzyme uses phosphoenolpyruvate as the phosphoryl group donor and then forms ATP in the presence of phosphate.

One study determined that pyruvate, water dikinase in Pyrococcus furiosus can act in a futile cycle between phosphoenolpyruvate and pyruvate as substrates/products. These two reactions can run through the metabolic pathways at the same time in opposite directions, which will dissipate energy as heat without other effects. This can remove unwanted energy, as the energy produced from glycolysis is much more than the energy required for growth and cellular repairs. This is possibly a mode of "energy spilling" in Pyrococcus furiosus. This is in part hypothesized because of to the high concentrations of this enzyme (~5% of protein in the cytoplasm) in Pyrococcus furiosus cells.

== Enzyme kinematics ==
The hyperthermostable pyruvate, water dikinase enzyme in Pyrococcus furiosus is encoded by the mlrA gene, which was found to be regulated by at least in part by maltose at a transcription level. Pyruvate, water dikinase catalyzes the reaction that converts phosphoenolpyruvate, AMP, and phosphate to pyruvate, ATP, and water. This enzyme also catalyzes the reverse reaction, but reaction rates and equilibrium constants show that the ATP production reaction direction is highly favorable. Pyruvate, water dikinase in Pyrococcus furiosus is sensitive to oxygen, with no enzyme activity measured in aerobic conditions. The purified pyruvate, water dikinase in Pyrococcus furiosus has a pH optimum between 6.5 and 9, and a temperature optimum around 90˚C. In the PEP formation reaction, pyruvate has an apparent K_{m} of 0.11mM, apparent k_{cat} of 1,573(s^{−1}) and apparent k_{cat}/K_{m} of 1.43 x 10^4 (mM^{−1}• s-^{1}), and ATP has an apparent Km of 0.39mM, apparent kcat of 1,326(s^{−1}) and apparent kcat/Km of 3.40 x 10^3 (mM^{−1} • s^{−1}). In the pyruvate formation reaction, PEP has an apparent K_{m} of 0.40mM, apparent k_{cat} of 12.6(s^{−1}) and apparent k_{cat}/K_{m} of 31.5 (mM^{−1} • s^{−1}), AMP has an apparent K_{m} of 1.00mM, apparent k_{cat} of 8.7(s^{−1}) and apparent k_{cat}/K_{m} of 8.7 (mM^{−1} • s^{−1}), and phosphate has an apparent K_{m} of 38.4mM, apparent k_{cat} of 11.9(s^{−1}) and apparent k_{cat}/K_{m} of 0.315(mM^{−1} • s^{−1}). The equilibrium constant K_{eq} of the reaction is 1.07 at 50˚C, and the change in Gibbs free energy (ΔG˚) is -0.04 kcal/mol at experimental conditions.
