= Nucleoside phosphotransferase =

nucleoside phosphotransferase

Identifiers
- EC no.: 2.7.1.77
- CAS no.: 9055-37-2

Databases
- IntEnz: IntEnz view
- BRENDA: BRENDA entry
- ExPASy: NiceZyme view
- KEGG: KEGG entry
- MetaCyc: metabolic pathway
- PRIAM: profile
- PDB structures: RCSB PDB PDBe PDBsum
- Gene Ontology: AmiGO / QuickGO
Search
- PMC: articles
- PubMed: articles
- NCBI: proteins

In enzymology, a nucleoside phosphotransferase (EC 2.7.1.77) is an enzyme that catalyzes the chemical reaction

a nucleotide + a 2'-deoxynucleoside $\rightleftharpoons$ a nucleoside + a 2'-deoxynucleoside 5'-phosphate

Thus, the two substrates of this enzyme are nucleotide and 2'-deoxynucleoside, whereas its two products are nucleoside and 2'-deoxynucleoside 5'-phosphate.

This enzyme belongs to the family of transferases, specifically those transferring phosphorus-containing groups (phosphotransferases) with an alcohol group as acceptor. The systematic name of this enzyme class is nucleotide:nucleoside 5'-phosphotransferase. Other names in common use include nonspecific nucleoside phosphotransferase, and nucleotide:3'-deoxynucleoside 5'-phosphotransferase.
