= Formate kinase =

Class of enzymes

Identifiers
- EC no.: 2.7.2.6
- CAS no.: 9026-65-7

Databases
- IntEnz: IntEnz view
- BRENDA: BRENDA entry
- ExPASy: NiceZyme view
- KEGG: KEGG entry
- MetaCyc: metabolic pathway
- PRIAM: profile
- PDB structures: RCSB PDB PDBe PDBsum
- Gene Ontology: AmiGO / QuickGO
Search
- PMC: articles
- PubMed: articles
- NCBI: proteins

Formate kinase (EC 2.7.2.6) is an enzyme that catalyzes the chemical reaction

formic acid
ATP
ADP
ATP
ADP
formyl phosphate

The enzyme characterised from the bacterium, Clostridium cylindrosporum, converts formic acid to formyl phosphate by transferring a phosphate group from the cofactor, adenosine triphosphate (ATP), which is converted to adenosine diphosphate (ADP).

This enzyme is a transferases, specifically one transferring phosphorus-containing groups (phosphotransferases) with a carboxy group as acceptor. The systematic name of this enzyme class is ATP:formate phosphotransferase.
