= ADP—thymidine kinase =

Enzyme

ADP-thymidine kinase

Identifiers
- EC no.: 2.7.1.118
- CAS no.: 82114-39-4

Databases
- IntEnz: IntEnz view
- BRENDA: BRENDA entry
- ExPASy: NiceZyme view
- KEGG: KEGG entry
- MetaCyc: metabolic pathway
- PRIAM: profile
- PDB structures: RCSB PDB PDBe PDBsum
- Gene Ontology: AmiGO / QuickGO
Search
- PMC: articles
- PubMed: articles
- NCBI: proteins

ADP—thymidine kinase (EC 2.7.1.118) is an enzyme that catalyzes a chemical reaction that converts thymidine to thymidine phosphate by transferring a phosphate group from the cofactor, adenosine diphosphate (ADP), which is converted to adenosine monophosphate (AMP):

ADP +
thymidine
AMP +
thymidine monophosphate

The enzyme was characterised from cells which had been infected with Herpes simplex virus.

This enzyme is a transferase, specifically one transferring phosphorus-containing groups (phosphotransferases) with an alcohol group as acceptor. The systematic name of this enzyme class is ADP:thymidine 5'-phosphotransferase. Other names in common use include ADP:dThd phosphotransferase, and adenosine diphosphate-thymidine phosphotransferase.

== See also ==
- AMP—thymidine kinase, which carries out the same reaction using AMP as phosphate donor
