= Nucleotide diphosphokinase =

Class of enzymes

nucleotide diphosphokinase

Identifiers
- EC no.: 2.7.6.4
- CAS no.: 53167-92-3

Databases
- IntEnz: IntEnz view
- BRENDA: BRENDA entry
- ExPASy: NiceZyme view
- KEGG: KEGG entry
- MetaCyc: metabolic pathway
- PRIAM: profile
- PDB structures: RCSB PDB PDBe PDBsum
- Gene Ontology: AmiGO / QuickGO
Search
- PMC: articles
- PubMed: articles
- NCBI: proteins

In enzymology, a nucleotide diphosphokinase (EC 2.7.6.4) is an enzyme that catalyzes the chemical reaction

ATP + nucleoside 5'-phosphate $\rightleftharpoons$ AMP + 5'-phosphonucleoside 3'-diphosphate

Thus, the two substrates of this enzyme are ATP and nucleoside 5'-phosphate, whereas its two products are AMP and 5'-phosphonucleoside 3'-diphosphate.

This enzyme belongs to the family of transferases, specifically those transferring two phosphorus-containing groups (diphosphotransferases). The systematic name of this enzyme class is ATP:nucleoside-5'-phosphate diphosphotransferase. Other names in common use include nucleotide pyrophosphokinase, ATP:nucleotide pyrophosphotransferase, ATP nucleotide 3'-pyrophosphokinase, and nucleotide 3'-pyrophosphokinase.
