= 1-phosphatidylinositol-3-phosphate 5-kinase =

Class of enzymes

Identifiers
- EC no.: 2.7.1.150

Databases
- IntEnz: IntEnz view
- BRENDA: BRENDA entry
- ExPASy: NiceZyme view
- KEGG: KEGG entry
- MetaCyc: metabolic pathway
- PRIAM: profile
- PDB structures: RCSB PDB PDBe PDBsum
- Gene Ontology: AmiGO / QuickGO
Search
- PMC: articles
- PubMed: articles
- NCBI: proteins

In enzymology, a 1-phosphatidylinositol-3-phosphate 5-kinase (EC 2.7.1.150) is an enzyme that catalyzes the chemical reaction

ATP + 1-phosphatidyl-1D-myo-inositol 3-phosphate ⇌ ADP + 1-phosphatidyl-1D-myo-inositol 3,5-bisphosphate

Thus, the two substrates of this enzyme are ATP and 1-phosphatidyl-1D-myo-inositol 3-phosphate, whereas its two products are ADP and 1-phosphatidyl-1D-myo-inositol 3,5-bisphosphate.

This enzyme belongs to the family of transferases, specifically those transferring phosphorus-containing groups (phosphotransferases) with an alcohol group as acceptor. The systematic name of this enzyme class is ATP:1-phosphatidyl-1D-myo-inositol-3-phosphate 5-phosphotransferase. Other names in common use include type III PIP kinase, and phosphatidylinositol 3-phosphate 5-kinase. This enzyme participates in phosphatidylinositol signaling system and regulation of actin cytoskeleton.
