= Selenophosphate synthetase 2 =

Enzyme found in humans

SEPHS2

Identifiers
- Aliases: SEPHS2, SPS2, SPS2b, selenophosphate synthetase 2
- External IDs: OMIM: 606218; MGI: 108388; GeneCards: SEPHS2
Enzyme activity
EC #	BRENDA	ExPASy	KEGG	MetaCyc
2.7.9.3	↗	↗	↗	↗

Gene location (Human)
Chr.	Chromosome 16 (human)
Band	16p11.2	Start	30,443,631 bp
Band	16p11.2	End	30,445,874 bp

Gene location (Mouse)
Chr.	Chromosome 7 (mouse)
Band	7 F3|7 69.43 cM	Start	126,871,051 bp
Band	7 F3|7 69.43 cM	End	126,873,227 bp
RNA expression pattern
Bgee	Human / Mouse (ortholog); Top expressed in: jejunal mucosa; kidney tubule; right lobe of liver; renal medulla; duodenum; human kidney; mucosa of colon; glomerulus; mucosa of sigmoid colon; secondary oocyte / Top expressed in: left lobe of liver; spermatocyte; right kidney; granulocyte; spermatid; renal corpuscle; Paneth cell; jejunum; human kidney; crypt of lieberkuhn of small intestine; More reference expression data
BioGPS	n/a
Gene ontology
Molecular function	transferase activity; nucleotide binding; ATP binding; kinase activity; selenide, water dikinase activity
Cellular component	cytosol; cellular component; cytoplasm
Biological process	phosphorylation; selenium compound metabolic process; selenocysteine biosynthetic process; selenocysteine metabolic process; tRNA seleno-modification
Sources:Amigo / QuickGO
Orthologs
Databases	NCBI: entry; OMA: entry
Species	Human	Mouse
Entrez	22928	20768
Ensembl	ENSG00000179918	ENSMUSG00000049091
UniProt	Q99611	P97364
RefSeq (mRNA)	NM_012248	NM_009266
RefSeq (protein)	NP_036380	NP_033292
Location (UCSC)	Chr 16: 30.44 – 30.45 Mb	Chr 7: 126.87 – 126.87 Mb
PubMed search
- Wikidata
View/Edit Human	View/Edit Mouse

Selenophosphate synthetase 2, also called Selenide, water dikinase 2, is an enzyme that in humans is encoded by the SEPHS2 gene. SEPHS2 is a selenoprotein that functions to produce selenophosphate which is needed in selenoprotein synthesis. It has a paralog, SEPHS1, which may also fulfill this role, but some more recent studies have cast doubt on SEPHS1's role in selenoprotein synthesis.

== Function ==
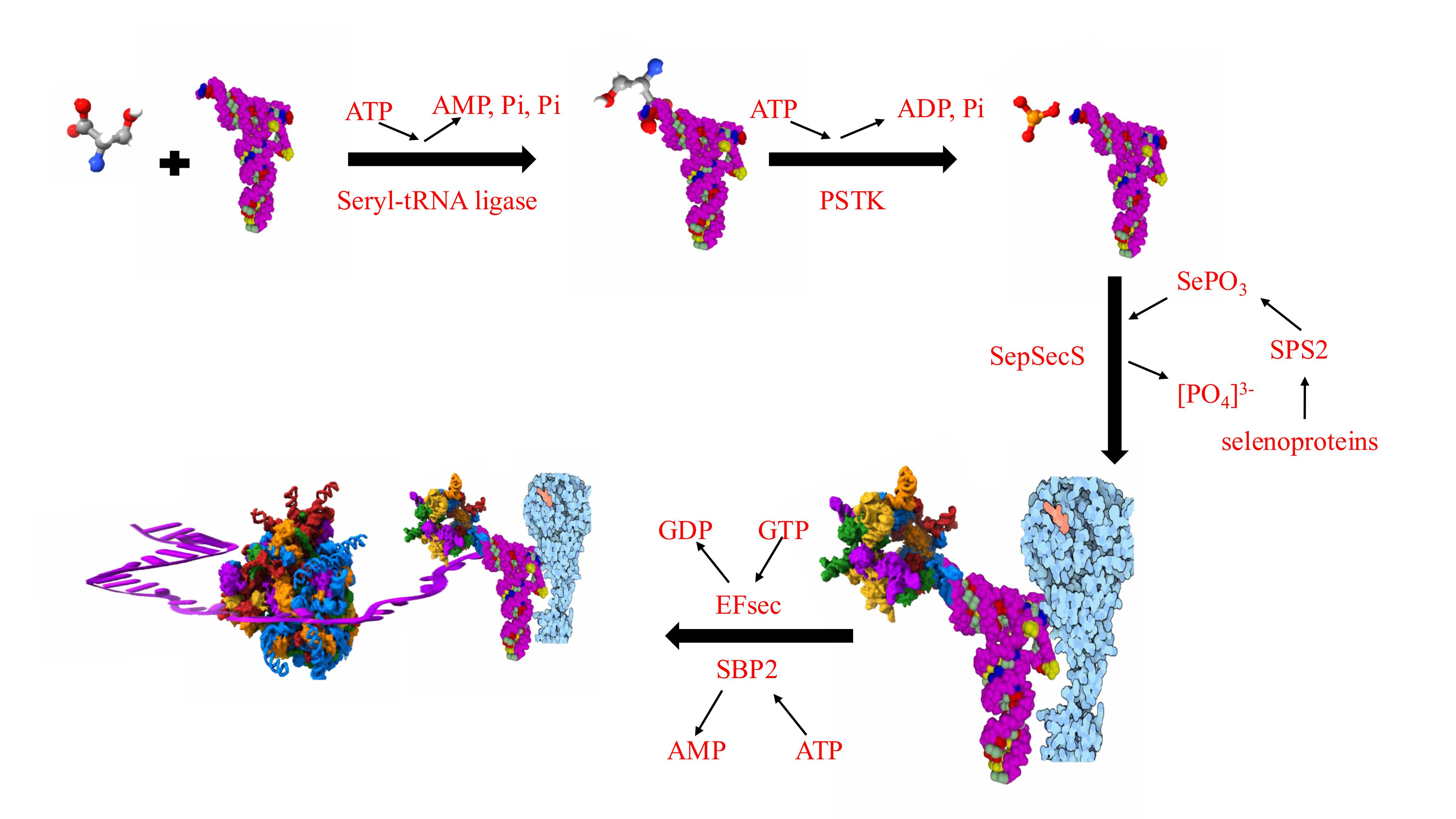
Selenocysteine synthesis pathway

Selenoproteins are a rare type of protein which incorporate the non-standard amino acid selenocysteine, which contains the element selenium. In eukaryotes and archaea, selenocysteine is produced from (tRNA-bound) serine through a two step process, where it is first phosphorylated by L-seryl-tRNA(Sec) kinase (EC 2.7.1.164), and then converted to selenocysteine by the enzyme SepSecS (EC 2.9.1.2). This second reaction requires selenophosphate, which is produced by selenide, water dikinases (EC 2.7.9.3), and in particular SEPHS2, which catalyzes the reaction:

ATP + selenide + H_{2}O = AMP + selenophosphate + phosphate

It is predicted to form a protein complex with SEPHS1, SepSecS, and TRNAU1AP. SEPHS2 has not yet been associated with any human diseases, but knock-out of the Sephs2 gene is lethal in mice during embryonic development.
