= Glutamate 1-kinase =

Enzyme

glutamate 1-kinase

Identifiers
- EC no.: 2.7.2.13
- CAS no.: 80700-24-9

Databases
- IntEnz: IntEnz view
- BRENDA: BRENDA entry
- ExPASy: NiceZyme view
- KEGG: KEGG entry
- MetaCyc: metabolic pathway
- PRIAM: profile
- PDB structures: RCSB PDB PDBe PDBsum
- Gene Ontology: AmiGO / QuickGO
Search
- PMC: articles
- PubMed: articles
- NCBI: proteins

In enzymology, a glutamate 1-kinase (EC 2.7.2.13) is an enzyme that catalyzes the chemical reaction

ATP + L-glutamate $\rightleftharpoons$ ADP + alpha-L-glutamyl phosphate

Thus, the two substrates of this enzyme are ATP and L-glutamate, whereas its two products are ADP and alpha-L-glutamyl phosphate.

This enzyme belongs to the family of transferases, specifically those transferring phosphorus-containing groups (phosphotransferases) with a carboxy group as acceptor. The systematic name of this enzyme class is ATP:L-glutamate 1-phosphotransferase.
