= PPDK =

PPDK may refer to:

- Pyruvate, phosphate dikinase, an enzyme
- Democratic Party of Kosovo
