= Guisinol =

Names
- IUPAC name [5-[(E)-but-2-en-2-yl]-3-hydroxy-2-methylphenyl] 2-[(E)-but-2-en-2-yl]-3-chloro-4,6-dihydroxy-5-methylbenzoate

Identifiers
CAS Number	221684-08-8
3D model (JSmol)	Interactive image
ChEBI	CHEBI:201987
ChemSpider	8844977
PubChem CID	10669625
- InChI: InChI=1S/C23H25ClO5/c1-7-11(3)15-9-16(25)13(5)17(10-15)29-23(28)19-18(12(4)8-2)20(24)22(27)14(6)21(19)26/h7-10,25-27H,1-6H3/b11-7+,12-8+ Key: AEQBAXLIEJZXPN-MKICQXMISA-N
- SMILES: C/C=C(\C)/C1=CC(=C(C(=C1)OC(=O)C2=C(C(=C(C(=C2O)C)O)Cl)/C(=C/C)/C)C)O

Properties
Chemical formula	C_{23}H_{25}ClO_{5}
Molar mass	416.90 g·mol^{−1}
- Except where otherwise noted, data are given for materials in their standard state (at 25 °C [77 °F], 100 kPa). Infobox references

Guisinol is an antibacterial depside with the molecular formula C_{23}H_{25}ClO_{5} that has been isolated from the fungus Aspergillus unguis.
