= Wicklowia aquatica =

Scientific classification
- Domain: Eukaryota
- Kingdom: Fungi
- Division: Ascomycota
- Class: Dothideomycetes
- Order: Pleosporales
- Family: Wicklowiaceae
- Genus: Wicklowia
- Species: W. aquatica

Binomial name
- Wicklowia aquatica Raja, A.Ferrer & Shearer (2010)

Species of fungus

Wicklowia aquatica is a freshwater fungus species in the genus Wicklowia that is found in Florida and Costa Rica. Wicklowia aquatica produces the depsidone compound folipastatin.
