= Folipastatin =

Names
- IUPAC name 1,7-bis[(Z)-but-2-en-2-yl]-3,9-dihydroxy-4,10-dimethylbenzo[b][1,4]benzodioxepin-6-one
- Other names E323392EAO

Identifiers
CAS Number	139959-71-0
3D model (JSmol)	Interactive image
ChEBI	CHEBI:202891
ChemSpider	4943834
PubChem CID	6439424
UNII	E323392EAO
- InChI: InChI=1S/C23H24O5/c1-7-11(3)15-9-17(24)13(5)20-19(15)23(26)28-21-14(6)18(25)10-16(12(4)8-2)22(21)27-20/h7-10,24-25H,1-6H3/b11-7-,12-8- Key: JJMKBGPTPXPMBH-OXAWKVHCSA-N
- SMILES: C/C=C(/C)\C1=CC(=C(C2=C1C(=O)OC3=C(O2)C(=CC(=C3C)O)/C(=C\C)/C)C)O

Properties
Chemical formula	C_{23}H_{24}O_{5}
Molar mass	380.440 g·mol^{−1}
- Except where otherwise noted, data are given for materials in their standard state (at 25 °C [77 °F], 100 kPa). Infobox references

Folipastatin is a depsidone phospholipase A2 inhibitor which is produced by the fungi Aspergillus unguis and Wicklowia aquatica. Folipastatin has the molecular formula C_{23}H_{24}O_{5}.
