= Selenophosphate synthetase 1 =

Protein-coding gene in the species Homo sapiens

SEPHS1
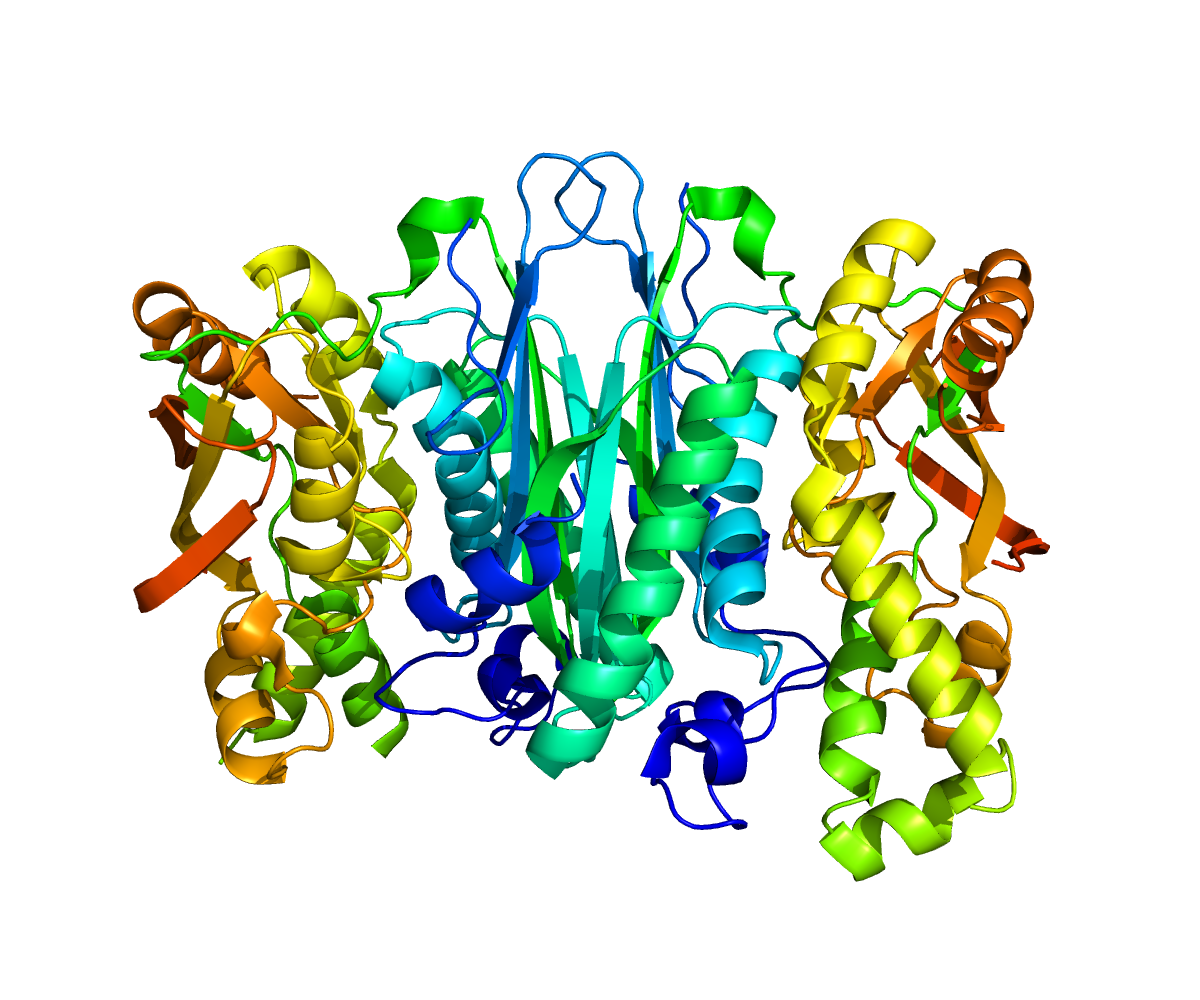

Identifiers
- Aliases: SEPHS1, SELD, SPS, SPS1, Selenophosphate synthetase 1
- External IDs: OMIM: 600902; MGI: 1923580; GeneCards: SEPHS1
Available structures
| PDB | Ortholog search: PDBe RCSB |
| PDB | List of PDB id codes 3FD5, 3FD6 |
Enzyme activity
| EC # | BRENDA | ExPASy | KEGG | MetaCyc |
|---|---|---|---|---|
| 2.7.9.3 | ↗ | ↗ | ↗ | ↗ |

Gene location (Human)
| Chr. | Chromosome 10 (human) |
| Band | 10p13 | Start | 13,317,428 bp |
| Band | 10p13 | End | 13,348,298 bp |

Gene location (Mouse)
| Chr. | Chromosome 2 (mouse) |
| Band | 2|2 A1 | Start | 4,881,564 bp |
| Band | 2|2 A1 | End | 4,910,557 bp |
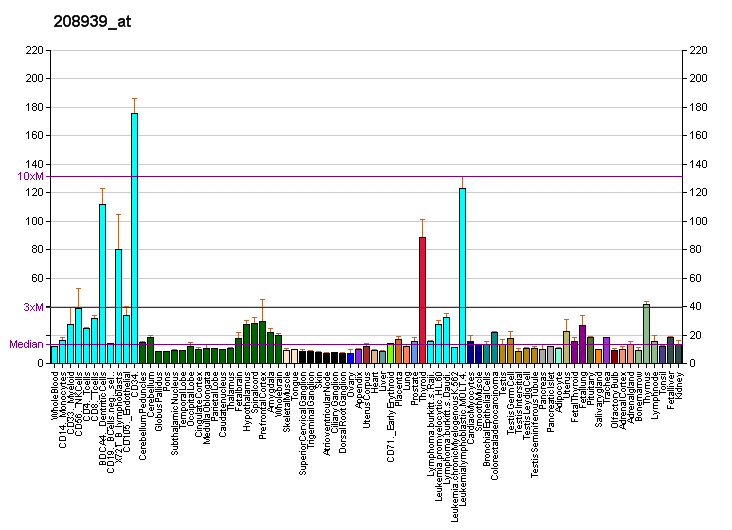

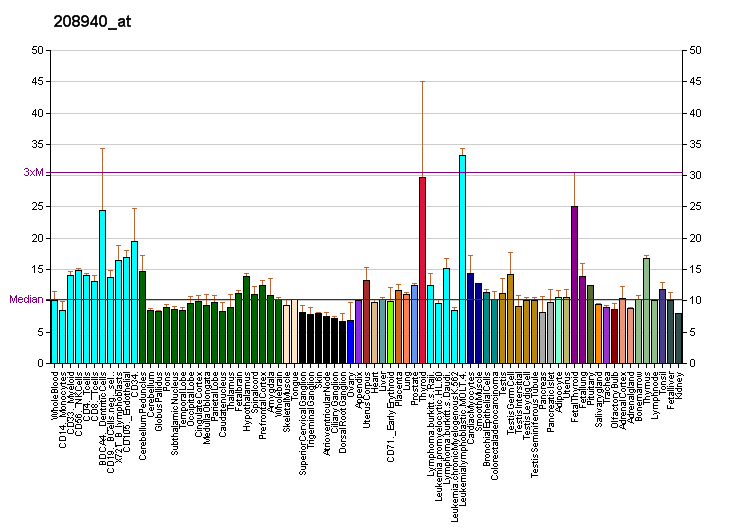

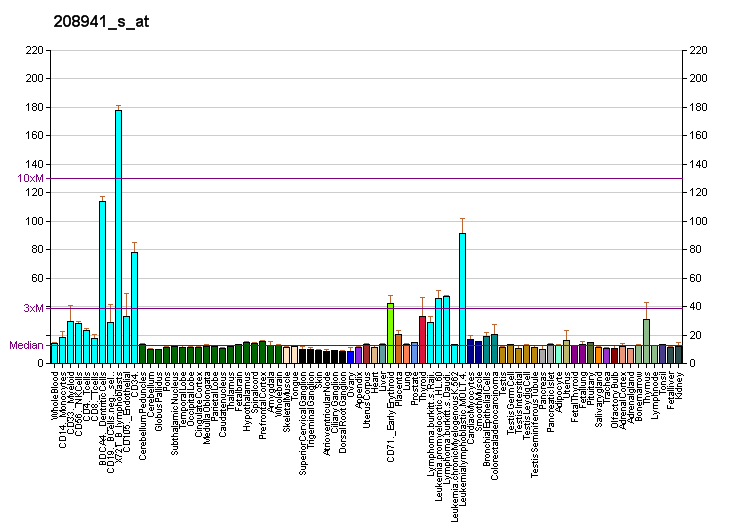
RNA expression pattern
| Bgee | Human / Mouse (ortholog); Top expressed in: ventricular zone; ganglionic eminence; islet of Langerhans; buccal mucosa cell; oocyte; olfactory zone of nasal mucosa; secondary oocyte; rectum; internal globus pallidus; right lobe of liver / Top expressed in: genital tubercle; tail of embryo; ventricular zone; maxillary prominence; mandibular prominence; condyle; ganglionic eminence; abdominal wall; primitive streak; internal carotid artery; More reference expression data |
| BioGPS | More reference expression data |
Gene ontology
| Molecular function | transferase activity; nucleotide binding; selenide, water dikinase activity; GTP binding; protein binding; ATP binding; protein homodimerization activity; identical protein binding; protein heterodimerization activity; kinase activity |
| Cellular component | cytoplasm; plasma membrane; nuclear membrane; membrane; nucleus |
| Biological process | phosphorylation; selenocysteine biosynthetic process; selenium compound metabolic process; tRNA seleno-modification |
Sources:Amigo / QuickGO
Orthologs
| Databases | NCBI: entry; OMA: entry |
| Species | Human | Mouse |
| Entrez | 22929 | 109079 |
| Ensembl | ENSG00000086475 | ENSMUSG00000026662 |
| UniProt | P49903; Q5T5U7 | Q8BH69 |
| RefSeq (mRNA) | NM_001195602; NM_001195604; NM_012247; NM_001375769; NM_001375770 | NM_175400 |
| RefSeq (protein) | NP_001182531; NP_001182533; NP_036379; NP_001362698 | NP_780609; NP_001349636; NP_001349637; NP_001349638; NP_001349639 |
| Location (UCSC) | Chr 10: 13.32 – 13.35 Mb | Chr 2: 4.88 – 4.91 Mb |
| PubMed search |
- Wikidata
| View/Edit Human | View/Edit Mouse |

Selenide, water dikinase 1 is an enzyme that in humans is encoded by the SEPHS1 gene.

This protein functions as an enzyme that synthesizes selenophosphate from selenide and ATP. Selenophosphate is the selenium donor used to synthesize selenocysteine, which is co-translationally incorporated into selenoproteins at in-frame UGA codons.

== See also ==
- Selenophosphate synthetase 2
