= Diphosphotransferase =

Class of enzymes

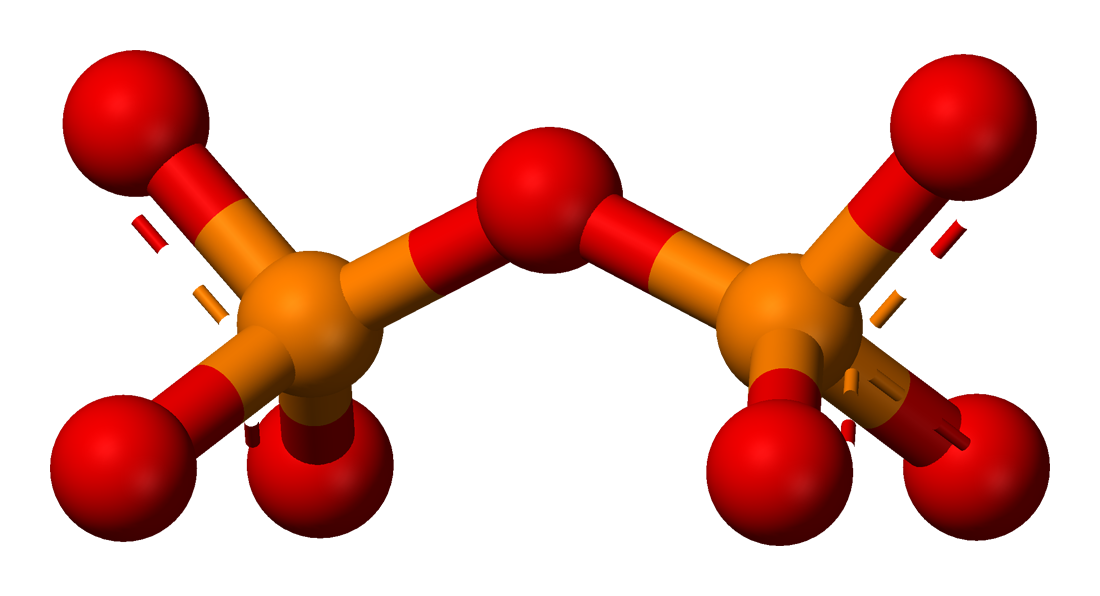
Ball-and-stick model of the pyrophosphate anion, P_{2}O_{7}^{4−}

Diphosphotransferase are phosphotransferase enzymes which act upon pyrophosphate groups.

They are classified under EC number 2.7.6.
