= Selenophosphate =

Class of chemical compounds

A selenophosphate is a chemical compound containing phosphate anions substituted with selenium. Over 7000 compounds are known with a bond between selenium and phosphorus. Compared to phosphorus-sulfur compounds selenophosphates are less thermally stable, and more easily destroyed by water. However they are more stable than tellurophosphates which have an even weaker phosphorus-tellurium bond. Selenophosphates have an oxidation number for phosphorus of +5. But in many there are bonds between phosphorus atoms, reducing the oxidation state to +4, Some may be termed selenophosphites.

Different structural anions include hexaselenohypodiphosphate [P_{2}Se_{6}]^{4−} and [P_{6}Se_{12}]^{4−} with decalin structure and [P_{4}Se_{2}]^{2−} with dicyclobutane structure.

Selenophosphates are coloured, often orange. They are semiconductors.

The first selenodiphosphate was discovered in 1973 by H. Hahn.

Selenophosphate compounds may have some or all of the selenium replaced by sulfur.

== Formation ==
Selenophosphates can be produced by melting phosphorus selenide with metal selenides.

== Molecular biology ==
Selenocysteine is produced in many organisms from a selenophosphate. In humans and other eucaryotes, this is facilitated by the enzyme selenophosphate synthetase 1. Selenium is connected to phosphorus using a reaction with selenide and adenosine triphosphate

== List ==
235 entries

formula	name	mw	crystal system	space group	unit cell Å	volume	density	comments	references
[(py_{2}Li)]_{4}[P_{2}Se_{6}]·2py								water stable	
(NH_{4})_{4}(P_{2}Se_{6})(H_{2}O)_{2}			triclinic	P1̅	a=7.3306 b=7.3761 c=9.5501 α =70.405° β =74.109° γ =60.681° Z=1	420.37	2.544		
[pyH]_{4}[P_{2}Se_{6}]·H_{2}O								water stable	
(NBu_{4})_{2}P_{2}Se_{8}	bis(Tetrabutylammonium) 3,6-diselenoxo-1,2,4,5-tetraselena-3,6-diphosphacyclohexane 3,6-diselenide acetonitrile solvate		monoclinic	P2_{1}/c	a 9.6284 b 16.9553 c 16.0899 β 96.875°			chair config	
(NBu_{4})_{3}P_{9}Se_{14}								orange-red	
	bis(1-Butyl-3-methylimidazolium) 3,6-diselenoxo-1,2,4,5-tetraselena-3,6-diphosphacyclohexane 3,6-diselenide		monoclinic	P2_{1}/n	a =7.6642 b =10.9948 c =17.0380 β =91.211°			chair config	
	bis(tetrakis(Acetonitrile-N)-lithium) 3,6-diselenoxo-1,2,4,5-tetraselena-3,6-diphosphacyclohexane 3,6-diselenide		orthorhombic	Pbam	a 20.0535(6)Å b 12.1200(5)Å c 15.0831			cradle config	
	bis((Tetrapyridine)-lithium) 3,6-diselenoxo-1,2,4,5-tetraselena-3,6-diphosphacyclohexane 3,6-diselenide		triclinic	P1̅	a 10.1582 b 10.7716 c 12.750 α 95.271° β 94.847° γ 114.219°			cradle config	
Na_{2}P_{4}Se_{2}								red-brown; P_{4} bicyclo structure	
Na_{3}PSe_{4}			cubic	I4̅3m	a=7.3094 Z=2		3.53	Na ion conductor 1 mS cm^{−1}	
Na_{4}P_{2}Se_{6}			orthorhombic	Cmca	a = 11.836 b = 13.311 c = 8.061 Z = 4	1270.0	3.283		
Na_{4}(P_{2}Se_{6})(H_{2}O)_{6}			monoclinic	P2_{1}/c	a 26.0636 b 7.2350 c 20.7197 β 113.387° Z=8	3586.13	2.726		
Mg_{2}P_{2}Se_{6}				R3	a = 6.404 c = 20.194 Z=3				
KPSe_{6}			orthorhombic	Pca2_{1}	a = 11.49 b = 6.791 c = 11.29 Z = 4			orange; NLO χ^{(2)}≈142.8 pm V^{−1}; band gap 2.1 eV	
K_{4}Sc_{2}(PSe_{4})_{2}(P_{2}Se_{6})			monoclinic	C2/c	a=22.668Å b=6.8147Å c=19.828 β=113.91°				
K_{2}P_{2}Se_{6}			trigonal	P3_{1}21	a = 7.2728, c = 18.872 Z = 3			at 298 K; SHG 50× AgGaSe_{2}	
K_{2}P_{2}Se_{6}			trigonal	P3_{1}21	a = 14.4916 c = 18.7999 Z = 12			at 173 K	
K_{3}PSe_{4}·2Se_{6}			cubic	Fd3̅	a = 16.415			at 193 K	
K_{4}(P_{2}Se_{6})(H_{2}O)_{4}			orthorhombic	Cmca	a =11.921 b =12.46 c =11.752 Z=4	1745.6	2.908		
K_{6}P_{8}Se_{18}		1903.66	monoclinic	P2_{1}/n	a=9.746 b=8.332 c=23.054 β=90.54° Z=2	1872.1	3.377	orange	
Ca_{2}P_{2}Se_{6}			monoclinic	P2_{1}/n	a = 9.664 b = 7.519 c = 6.859 β = 92.02°				
K_{4}Sc_{2}(PSe_{4})_{2}(P_{2}Se_{6})		737.82	monoclinic	C2/c	a=22.668 b=6.815 c=19.828 β =113.91° Z=8	2800.2	3.500	orange-yellow; turns red in air; band gap 2.25 eV	
KTiPSe_{5}									
K_{4}Ti_{2}(P_{2}Se_{9})_{2}(P_{2}Se_{7})								black	
Cr_{2}P_{2}Se_{6}									
LiCrP_{2}Se_{6}									
MnPSe_{3}			trigonal	R3̅				band gap 2.5 eV	
K_{2}MnP_{2}Se_{6}			monoclinic	P2_{1}/n	a=6.5349 b=12.696 c=7.589 β=102.67° Z=2	614.3			
FePSe_{3}									
Fe_{2}P_{2}Se_{6}			trigonal	R3̅				band gap 1.3 eV	
K_{2}FeP_{2}Se_{6}			monoclinic	P2_{1}/n	a=6.421 b=12.720 c=7.535 β=102.58 Z=2	600.7		red	
CuP_{2}Se								2D semiconductor; metallises under pressure	
m-Cu_{4}P_{2}Se_{6}			monoclinic	P2_{1}/c	a 6.370 b 11.780 c 20.013 β 90.03°				
Cu_{3}PSe_{4}			orthorhombic	Pmn2_{1}	a=7.700 b=6.677 c=6.385	328.3			
t-Cu_{4}P_{2}Se_{6}			triclinic	P1̅	a 7.104 b 11.889 c 12.759 α 74.35° β 79.63° γ 80.85°				
Cu_{4}P_{3}Se_{4}			triclinic	P1̅	a 6.440 b 7.085 c 10.616 α 73.11° β 74.86° γ 77.00°				
Cu_{4}P_{4}Se_{3}			monoclinic	P2_{1}/c	a 16.446 b 6.515 c 17.339 β 119.08°				
CuP_{2}Se			orthorhombic	Pbca	a 5.608 b 6.496 c 16.570				
CuAl[P_{2}Se_{6}]			trigonal	R3̅	a = 6.2795 c = 19.9713 Z =3				
K_{2}Cu_{2}P_{4}Se_{10}		1118.78	monoclinic	P2_{1}/n	a=10.627 b=7.767 c=11.966 β=109.125° Z=2	933.2	3.981	red	
K_{3}Cu_{3}P_{3}Se_{9}			monoclinic	P2_{1}/c	a = 8.741 b = 10.774, c = 20.033, β = 92.96°				
[Cu_{12}(P_{2}Se_{6}){Se_{2}P(OEt)_{2}}_{8}]	Et=Ethyl; diethyl diselenophosphate hexaselenodiphosphate(IV)								
[Cu_{12}(P_{2}Se_{6}){Se_{2}P(OiPr)_{2}}_{8}]	iPr=isopropyl								
CuCr[P_{2}Se_{6}]			monoclinic	C2/m	a=6.193 b=10.724 c=6.909 β=107.2° Z=2	690.2	4.9	melt 730 °C; dark red	
Zn_{2}P_{2}Se_{6}				R3	a = 6.290 c = 19.93 Z=3				
K_{2}ZnP_{2}Se_{6}			monoclinic	P2_{1}/c	a = 12.537 b = 7.274 c = 14.164 β = 109.63° Z = 4	1216		yellow	
LiGaP_{2}Se_{6}			trigonal	P3̅1c	a = 6.2993 c = 13.308			red; melt 458 °C; band gap 2.01 eV; water and air stable	
K_{4}GeP_{4}Se_{12}			orthorhombic	Pca2_{1}	a=13.9465 b=7.2435 c=24.0511				
K_{4}Ge_{4-x}P_{x}Se_{12}			monoclinic	P2_{1}/c	a = 6.7388 b = 13.489 c = 6.3904 β = 91.025°				
K_{7}As_{3}(P_{2}Se_{6})_{4}			monoclinic	P2_{1}/c	a=25.0706 b=9.5948 c=59.6227 β=93.384°			melt 388 °C	
K_{6}As_{2}(P_{2}Se_{6})_{3}			monoclinic	P2_{1}/c	a 8.0898 b 23.3142 c 12.1919 β 124.809°			melt 410 °C; orange; band gap 2.2 eV	
RbPSe_{6}			orthorhombic	Pca2_{1}	a = 11.776 b = 6.858 c = 11.460 Z = 4			NLO χ^{(2)}≈150 pm V^{−1}	
Rb_{2}P_{2}Se_{6}			trigonal	P3_{1}21	a = 7.2982 c = 19.002 and Z = 3			100 K	
Rb_{4}P_{2}Se_{9}			monoclinic	C2/c	a = 9.725 b = 10.468 c = 19.155 β = 93.627° Z = 4	1946.1	3.804		
Rb_{4}P_{6}Se_{12}			orthorhombic	Pca2_{1}	a =16.409 b =10.64 c =15.105			bicyclic with >PP< bridge and -SePSe_{2}PSe_{2}Se- ring	
Rb_{10}P_{4}Se_{25}									
Rb_{4}(P_{2}Se_{6})(H_{2}O)_{4}			orthorhombic	Pnnm	a 9.834 b 12.456 c 7.585 Z=2	929.1	3.395		
RbTiPSe_{5}									
Rb_{4}Ti_{2}(P_{2}Se_{9})_{2}(P_{2}Se_{7})			orthorhombic	Fdd2	a=35.55 b=37.315 c=6.574 Z=4	8772	3.956	black	
Rb_{2}MnP_{2}Se_{6}									
Rb_{2}ZnP_{2}Se_{6}			triclinic	P1̅	a = 7.494 b = 7.601 c = 12.729 α = 96.57° β = 105.52° γ = 110.54° Z = 2	636.6			
Rb_{4}GeP_{4}Se_{12}			orthorhombic	Pca2_{1}	a=14.1881 b=7.3566 c=24.2914				
Rb_{6}Ge_{2}P_{2}Se_{14}			triclinic	P1̅	a = 7.2463 b = 9.707 c = 11.987 α = 79.516° β = 89.524° γ = 68.281°			band gap 2.2 eV	
Sr_{2}P_{2}Se_{6}			monoclinic	P2_{1}/n	a = 9.844 b = 7.788 c = 6.963 β = 91.50° Z=2				
NaYP_{2}Se_{6}		647.6	triclinic	P1̅	a=6.9456 b=7.4085 c=9.5306 α=88.819° β=87.748° γ=89.580° Z=2			yellow	follow up refs
KYP_{2}Se_{6}			orthorhombic	P2_{1}2_{1}2_{1}	a = 6.7366 b = 7.4286 c = 21.603 Z = 4				
[(Cp′′_{2}Zr)_{2}(μ,η^{1:1:1:1}-P_{2}Se_{4})]	Cp′′ = C_{5}H_{3}tBu_{2}	1269.41	monoclinic	P2_{1}/n	a=15.2831 b=9.91947 c=18.6250 β=102.835° Z=2	2753	1.531	dark purple	
KZrPSe_{6}			orthorhombic	Pmc2_{1}	a=3.7079 b=15.074 c=18.491				
RbZrPSe_{6}									
KNb_{2}PSe_{10}			monoclinic	Pc	a=7.2931 b=15.612 c=13.557 β=106.64°			resistivity 4.5 Ω·cm	
RbNb_{2}PSe_{10}			monoclinic	Pc	a=7.381 b=7.8359 c=13.564 β=106.75°				
K_{3}RuP_{5}Se_{10}			monoclinic	P2_{1}/m	a 11.2099 b 7.2868 c 12.3474 β 93.958°				
PdPSe								semiconductor	
K_{2}PdP_{2}Se_{6}									
Rb_{2}PdP_{2}Se_{6}									
Ag_{4}P_{2}Se_{6}		1013.69	orthorhombic	P2_{1}2_{1}2_{1}	a=6.5760 b=11.5819 c=14.137 Z=4	1076.8	5.966	melt 642 °C; dark red	
AgAl[P_{2}Se_{6}]			monoclinic	C2/m	a=6.348 b=10.989 c=7.028 β=107.2° Z=2			melt 588 °C; yellow	
K_{2}Ag_{2}P_{2}Se_{6}			monoclinic	P2_{1}/c	a=8.528 b=11.251 c=20.975 β=93.24° Z=4	2009		orange	
AgCrP_{2}Se_{6}			monoclinic	C2/m	a=6.305 b=10.917; c=6.991 β=107.7° Z=2			melt 720 °C; dark red	
AgCrP_{2}Se_{6}				P3_{1}12	a=6.3257 c=20.0198			layered; antiferromagnetic <42K; band gap 1.240 eV	
AgGa[P_{2}Se_{6}]			orthorhombic	Pbca	α=12.169 b=22.484 c=7.473 Z=4	2044.7		melt 450 °C; orange	
AgGa[P_{2}Se_{6}]			trigonal	P3̅1/c	a=6.375 c=13.320 Z=2	468.81	5.05	dark red	
AgScP_{2}Se_{6}		688.54	trigonal	P3̅1/c	a=6.463 c=13.249 Z=2	482.93	4.735	orange or brown	
CdPSe_{3}									
K_{2}CdP_{2}Se_{6}			monoclinic	P2_{1}/n				dark yellow	
Rb_{2}CdP_{2}Se_{6}		819.05	monoclinic	P2_{1}/n	a=6.640 b=12.729 c=7.778 β=98.24° Z=2	650.5	4.180	dark yellow; air stable	
Rb_{8}Cd_{4}(Se_{2})(PSe_{4})_{4}									
InPSe_{3}									
In_{2}(P_{3}Se_{9})			monoclinic	P2_{1}/n					
LiInP_{2}Se_{6}		657.46	trigonal	P3̅1/c	a=6.397 c=13.350 Z=2	473.15	4.615	band gap 2.06 eV	
(Ph_{4}P)[In(P_{2}Se_{6})]			monoclinic	C2/c	a = 23.127 b = 6.564 c = 19.083 β = 97.42° Z = 4	2873		@23 °C yellow	
KInP_{2}Se_{6}			monoclinic	P2_{1}/n	a=7.511 b=6.4861 c=22.789 β=98.91° Z=4	1096.9			
K_{5}In_{3}(μ^{3}-Se)(P_{2}Se_{6})_{3}			triclinic	P1̅	a 7.6603 b 13.1854 c 18.378 α 87.04° β 88.659° γ 82.025°				
K_{4}In_{4}(μ-Se)_{2}(P_{2}Se_{6})_{3}			monoclinic	P2_{1}/c	a 19.707 b 7.712 c 13.229 α 90° β 106.42°				
K_{4}In_{2}(PSe_{5})_{2}(P_{2}Se_{6})			monoclinic	Cc	a=11.1564 b=22.8771 c=12.6525 β=109.039° Z=4			brick-red; air stable	
K_{4}In_{4}(μ-Se)(P_{2}S_{2.36}Se_{3.64})_{3}			triclinic	P1̅	a 7.7709 b 13.0007 c 18.9382 α 105.382° β 92.632° γ 91.91°				
CuInP_{2}Se_{6}			trigonal	P3̅1/c	a=6.392 c=13.338 Z=2	472.0	5.0	melt 642 °C; dark red; phase transitions at 5.4 and 14.1 GPa; metallised at 25.1 GPa	
AgInP_{2}Se_{6}			trigonal	P3̅1/c	a=6.483 c=13.330 Z=2	485.2	5.2	semiconductor; melt 673 °C; dark red; band gap 1.79 eV	
SnP_{2}Se_{6}				R3	a = 6.3213 c = 19.962			band gap 1.36–1.41 eV	
Sn_{2}P_{2}Se_{6}									
Na_{11.1}Sn_{2.1}P_{0.9}Se_{12}			tetragonal	I4_{1}/acd	a=14.2446 c=28.473 Z=8	5777.4	3.403	Na^{+} ion conductivity 3.0 mS/cm	
Rb_{3}Sn(PSe_{5})(P_{2}Se_{6})			monoclinic	P2_{1}/a	a=14.013 b=7.3436 c=21.983 β=106.61° Z=4			black	
K_{10}Sn_{3}(P_{2}Se_{6})_{4}			trigonal	R3̅	a = 24.1184 c = 7.6482			@100K; band gap 1.82 eV	
Rb_{4}Sn_{5}P_{4}Se_{20}		2638.41	trigonal	P3̅m1	a=7.6163 c=18.6898 Z=1	938.91	4.64	black	
Rb_{4}Sn_{2}Ag_{4}(P_{2}Se_{6})_{2}			monoclinic	P2_{1}/n	a=11.189 b=7.688 c=21.850 β=94.31° Z=2	1874.2	4.639	black	
Rb_{5}[Sn(PSe_{5})_{3}]			triclinic	P1̅	a 11.745 b 19.23 c 7.278 α 99.97° β 107.03° γ 87.16°				
Sb_{4}(P_{2}Se_{6})_{3}			monoclinic	P2_{1}/n	a = 20.777 b = 7.4935 c = 9.4949 β = 91.25°				
KSbP_{2}Se_{6}		696.55							
β-KSbP_{2}Se_{6}		696.55	monoclinic	P2_{1}	a=6.8925 b=7.8523 c=10.166 β=91.487 Z=2	550.4	4.203	dark red	
AgSbP_{2}Se_{6}								hygroscopic	
α-CsPSe_{6}			monoclinic	P2_{1}/n	a = 6.877 b = 12.713 c = 11.242 β = 92.735° Z = 4			orange	
β-CsPSe_{6}		637.64	tetragonal	P4̅2_{1}c	a = 12.526 c = 12.781 Z = 8	2005.3	4.224	red orange; metastable; SHG χ^{(2)} ~30 pm/V	
Cs_{2}P_{2}Se_{8}			orthorhombic	Ccce	a = 14.982 b = 24.579 c = 13.065			band gap 2.44 ± 0.2 eV; P_{2}Se_{4} ring; third harmonic generator coefficient 2.4 ± 0.1 × 10^{5} pm^{2}/V^{2}	
Cs_{3}PSe_{4}			orthorhombic	Pnma	a = 10.0146 b = 11.990 c = 9.9286 Z = 4	1192.2	4.154		
Cs_{4}P_{2}Se_{9}									
Cs_{4}P_{2}Se_{10}			triclinic	P1̅	a=7.359 b=7.455 c=10.142 α=85.938°, β=88.055° γ=85.609°			[P_{2}Se_{10}]^{4−}	
Cs_{4}[P_{6}Se_{12}]		1664.98	monoclinic	P2_{1}/n	a =10.836 b =10.5437 c =12.273 β =98.661°	1386.3	3.989	orange; melt 697; NLO	
Cs_{5}[P_{5}Se_{12}]		1766.92	tetragonal	P4̅	a =13.968 c =7.546 Z=2	1472.2	3.986	orange; NLO; band gap 2.17 eV	
Cs_{10}P_{8}Se_{20}			orthorhombic	Pnnm	a = 26.5456 b = 8.0254 c = 11.9031 Z = 2	2535.8	4.133	(PSe_{2})_{3}Se rings and P_{2}Se_{6}	
Cs_{4}(P_{2}Se_{6})(H_{2}O)_{4}			orthorhombic	Pnnm	a=10.0514 b=12.6867 c=7.8403 Z=2	999.8	3.775		
K_{0.6}Cs_{0.4}PSe_{6}			orthorhombic	Pca2_{1}	a=11.830 b=6.908 c=11.516 Z=4	941.1	4.085	orange; band gap 2.1 eV; SHG χ^{(2)} ~150 pm/V	
KCsP_{2}Se_{8}			orthorhombic	Ccce	a = 14.782 b = 23.954 c = 13.044			band gap 2.36 ± 0.2 eV	
Cs_{2}MnP_{2}Se_{6}			monoclinic	P2_{1}/n	6.4761 b=13.006 c=7.974 β=93.09° Z=2	670.6			
Cs_{2}FeP_{2}Se_{6}									
Cs_{2}Cu_{2}P_{2}Se_{6}			monoclinic	P2_{1}/c	a=9.958 b=13.067 c=10.720 β=102.46° Z=4	1363		dark green	
Cs_{2}ZnP_{2}Se_{6}			triclinic	P1̅	a = 7.6543 b = 7.7006 c = 12.737 α = 97.007° β = 104.335° γ = 109.241° Z = 2	669.5		yellow; band gap 2.67 eV	
Cs_{4}GeP_{4}Se_{12}			orthorhombic	Pca2_{1}	a=14.3268 b=7.6202 c=24.6301				
Cs_{6}As_{2}(P_{2}Se_{6})_{3}			monoclinic	P2_{1}/c	a=19.5759 b=7.9206 c=13.0553 β=101.914°			orange band gap 2.1 eV	
Cs_{5}As(P_{2}Se_{6})_{2}			tetragonal	P4_{2}/m	a=13.826 c=7.5173			melt 416 °C; red; band gap 2.0 eV	
RbCsP_{2}Se_{8}			orthorhombic	Ccce				band gap 2.41 ± 0.2 eV	
Cs_{2}YP_{2}Se_{7}	?	1938.78	monoclinic	P2_{1}/n	a=10.0921 b=7.1780 c=20.2636 β=97.895°	1454	4.428	yellow; band gap 2.74 eV	
CsZrPSe_{6}								band gap 2.0 eV	
CsNb_{2}PSe_{10}			monoclinic	Pc	a=14.6257 b=7.8097 c=13.5533 β=98.557°				
Cs_{4}Pd(PSe_{4})_{2}			monoclinic	P2_{1}/c	a = 7.491 b = 13.340 c = 10.030 β = 92.21° Z = 2			red	
Cs_{10}Pd(PSe_{4})_{4}			tetragonal	P4̅2c	a = 13.949 c = 11.527 Z = 4			red	
Cs_{2}PdP_{2}Se_{6}			tetragonal	P4_{2}/mnm	a = 8.5337 c = 10.5595 Z = 4			black	
Cs_{2}Ag_{2}P_{2}Se_{6}			monoclinic	P2_{1}/n	a=6.807 b=12.517 c=8.462 β=95.75° Z=2	717.3		yellow	
Cs_{2}CdP_{2}Se_{6}			monoclinic	P2_{1}/n				yellow	
Cs_{5}In(P_{2}Se_{6})_{2}			tetragonal	P4_{2}/m	a = 13.886 c = 7.597 Z = 2	1464.9		@23 °C; dark orange	
Cs_{3}In(In_{4}Se_{7})(P_{2}Se_{6})			monoclinic	Cm	a=13.717 b=8.0568 c=13.171 β=94.882° Z=2	1450.3	4.720	yellow; air stable; band gap 2.45; birefringence 0.26 @1064; melt 700 °C	
Cs_{4}Sn(P_{2}Se_{6})_{2}		1721.73	trigonal	R3̅	a=7.808 c=37.905 Z=3	2001.4	4.285	black	
α-Cs_{2}SnP_{2}Se_{6}		920.2	monoclinic	P2_{1}/c	a=10.230 b =12.990 c=10.949 β=94.529°	1450.5	4.2126	orange	
Cs_{2}SnP_{2}Se_{6}			monoclinic	P2_{1}/c	a = 10.1160 b = 12.7867 c = 11.0828 β = 94.463°			@100K	
Cs_{4}(Sn_{3}Se_{8})[Sn(P_{2}Se_{6})]_{2}		2828.17	tyrigonal	P3̅m1	a=7.695 c=18.797 Z=1	964.0	4.872	black; 2D	
Cs_{6}[Sn_{2}Se_{4}(PSe_{5})_{2}]			triclinic	P1̅	a 9.899 b 12.416 c 7.497 α 91.62° β 110.19° γ 79.94°				
CuSbP_{2}Se_{6}				C2/m					
AgSbP_{2}Se_{6}				C2/m					
Cs_{8}Sb_{4}(P_{2}Se_{6})_{5}									
Ba_{2}P_{2}Se_{6}			monoclinic	P2_{1}/n	a = 10.355 b = 7.862 c = 7.046 β = 90.83° Z=2				
Ba_{3}(PSe_{4})_{2}			monoclinic	P2_{1}/a	a = 12.282 b = 6.906 c = 18.061 β = 90.23° Z = 4				
Ba_{3}PO_{4}PSe_{4}			triclinic	P1	a=6.779 b=7.108 c=12.727 α=82.45 β=78.88 γ=81.34 Z=2			orange	
KBaPSe_{4}			orthorhombic	Pnma	a=11.972 b=6.973 c=10.388 Z=4			pale orange	
KLaP_{2}Se_{6}		713.71	monoclinic	P2_{1}/c	a=12.425 b=7.8047 c=11.9279 β=109.612°	1089.6	4.351	yellow	
K_{2}La(P_{2}Se_{6})_{1/2}(PSe_{4})			monoclinic	P2_{1}/n	a = 9.4269 b = 7.2054 c = 21.0276 β = 97.484° Z = 4				
K_{3}La(PSe_{4})_{2}			monoclinic	P2_{1}/c	a = 9.5782 b = 17.6623 c = 9.9869 β = 90.120° Z = 4				
K_{3}LaP_{2}Se_{8}									
K_{4}La_{0.67}(PSe_{4})_{2}			orthorhombic	Ibam	a = 19.0962 b = 9.1408 c = 10.2588 Z = 4				
K_{6}LaP_{4}Se_{16}									
K_{8.5}La_{1+1/3}(PSe_{4})_{4}			orthorhombic	Ccca	a = 18.2133 b = 38.0914 c = 10.2665 Z = 8				
Cs_{4}La_{2}(PSe_{4})_{2}(P_{2}Se_{6})			monoclinic	P2_{1}/n	a=10.2483 b=7.2560 c=20.4606 β=98.775 Z=4	1503.68	4.503	orange	
Ce_{4}(P_{2}Se_{6})_{3}		722.06	monoclinic	P2_{1}/c	a = 6.8057 b = 22.969 c = 11.7226 β = 124.096° Z = 6		4.741	orange	
NaCeP_{2}Se_{6}			monoclinic	P2_{1}/c	a = 12.1422 b = 7.6982 c = 11.7399 β = 111.545° Z=4			yellow	
KCeP_{2}Se_{6}			monoclinic	P2_{1}/c					
Cu_{0.4}Ce_{1.2}P_{2}Se_{6}			monoclinic	P2_{1}/c	a = 12.040 b = 7.6418 c = 11.700 β = 111.269° Z = 4			yellow	
Rb_{2}CeP_{2}Se_{7}			monoclinic	P2_{1}/n				red; air sensitive	
Rb_{3}CeP_{2}Se_{8}		1090.13	monoclinic	P2_{1}/c	a = 9.6013 b = 18.0604 c = 10.0931 β = 90.619° Z = 4	1750.07	4.137	orange; air sensitive	
Rb_{9}Ce(PSe_{4})_{4}			monoclinic	C2/c	a=21.446 b=10.575 c=18.784 β =115.94° Z=4	3831	3.980	orange; air and water destroyed; soluble in 18-crown-6 + dmf; band gap 2.26 eV	
AgCeP_{2}Se_{6}			monoclinic	P2_{1}/c	a = 9.971 b = 7.482 c = 11.757 β = 145.630° Z=2			orange	
CsCe[P_{2}Se_{6}]			monoclinic	P2_{1}/c	a = 12.9786 b = 7.7624 c = 11.9843 β = 106.589° Z = 4				
Cs_{4}Ce_{2}(PSe_{4})_{2}(P_{2}Se_{6})			monoclinic	P2_{1}/n	a=10.3127 b=7.2453 c=20.396 β=98.740 Z=4	1491.8	4.544	red	
KPrP_{2}Se_{6}			monoclinic	P2_{1}/c					
Cs_{2}PrP_{2}Se_{7}			monoclinic	P2_{1}/n	a=10.2118 b=7.2423 c=20.3741 β =98.624° Z=4				
Cs_{4}Pr_{2}(PSe_{4})_{2}(P_{2}Se_{6})			monoclinic	P2_{1}/n	a=10.2002 b=7.2380 c=20.3498 β=98.633	1485.38	4.567	orange	
Cs_{4}Nd_{2}(PSe_{4})_{2}(P_{2}Se_{6})			monoclinic	P2_{1}/n	a=10.1820 b=7.2343 c=20.3179 β=98.537 Z=4	1480.03	4.599	orange	
Eu_{2}P_{2}Se_{6}			monoclinic	P2_{1}/n	a = 9.779 b = 7.793 c = 6.957 β = 91.29° Z=2				
LiEuPSe_{4}			orthorhombic	Ama2	a = 10.5592 b = 10.415 c = 6.4924 Z = 4			red; air unstable	
Na_{8}Eu_{2}(Si_{2}Se_{6})_{2}			monoclinic	C2/m	a=7.090 b=12.228 c=7.950 β=107.427° Z = 1	657.6			
KEuPSe_{4}			monoclinic	P2_{1}/m	a = 6.8469 b = 6.9521 c = 9.0436 β = 107.677° Z = 2			red; air unstable	
KEuPSe_{4}			orthorhombic	Pnma	a = 17.516 b = 7.0126 c = 6.9015 Z = 4				
K_{4}Eu(PSe_{4})_{2}			orthorhombic	Ibam	a = 19.020 b = 9.131 c = 10.198 Z = 4				
Cs_{3}GdP_{2}Se_{8}			monoclinic	P2_{1}/c					
NaSmP_{2}Se_{6}		709.94	triclinic	P1̅	a 6.8368 b 7.5312 c 9.557 α 90.799° β 91.910° γ 90.351° Z=2			red	
Na_{9}Sm(Ge_{2}Se_{6})_{2}			monoclinic	C2/m	a = 7.916 b = 12.244 c = 7.105 β = 106.99° Z = 1	658.6			
KSmP_{2}Se_{6}		725.15	monoclinic	P2_{1}	a=6.7888 b=7.6185 c=10.1962 β=91.508 Z=2	527.17	4.568	red	
CsSmP_{2}Se_{6}			orthorhombic	P2_{1}2_{1}2_{1}	a = 6.8867 b = 7.5448 c = 22.152 Z = 4				
Cs_{4}Sm_{2}(PSe_{4})_{2}(P_{2}Se_{6})			monoclinic	P2_{1}/n	a=10.1521 b=7.2127 c=20.262 β=98.417 Z=4	1467.7	4.665	red	
NaGdP_{2}Se_{6}		715.94	triclinic	P1̅	a 6.8464 b 7.4916 c 9.5372 α 90.813° β 92.026° γ 90.241° Z=2			yellow	
KGdP_{2}Se_{6}			monoclinic	P2_{1}	a=6.7802 b=7.5809 c=10.1967 β=91.638 Z=2	523.97	4.640	yellow	
Rb_{2}GdP_{2}Se_{7}		1037.73	monoclinic	P2_{1}/n	a = 10.137 b = 7.212 c = 20.299 β = 98.23° Z = 4	1468.8	4.692	orange; air sensitive	
Cs_{4}Gd_{2}(PSe_{4})_{2}(P_{2}Se_{6})			monoclinic	P2_{1}/n	a=10.1203 b=7.2039 c=20.2528 β=98.1990 Z=4	1461.45	2.716	orange; birefringence 0.155@546 nm	
NaTbP_{2}Se_{6}		717.61	triclinic	P1̅	a=6.8854 b=7.4580 c=9.5196 α=89.068° β=87.899° γ=89.974° Z=2			yellow	
KTbP_{2}Se_{6}			monoclinic	P2_{1}	a=6.7609 b=7.5570 c=10.2158 β=91.732 Z=2	521.71	4.671	yellow	
KTbP_{2}Se_{6}			orthorhombic					red over 9.2 GPa	
Cs_{4}Tb_{2}(PSe_{4})_{2}(P_{2}Se_{6})			monoclinic	P2_{1}/n	a=10.1060 b=7,1861 c=20.2354 β=98.082° Z=4	1454.95	4.745	orange	
NaDyP_{2}Se_{6}		721.19	triclinic	P1̅	a 6.9114 b 7.4258 c 9.5256 α 88.914° β 87.829° γ 89.695° Z=2			yellow	
CsEr[P_{2}Se_{6}]			monoclinic	P2_{1}/c	a = 7.5381 b = 12.8192 c = 12.7647 β = 106.898° Z = 4				
AgErP_{2}Se_{6}		810.83	trigonal	P3̅1/c	a=6.578 c=13.410 Z=2	502.6	5.358	dark brown	
AgTmP_{2}Se_{6}		812.50	trigonal	P3̅1/c	a=6.567 c=13.422 Z=2	501.27	5.383	dark brown	
K_{3}AuP_{2}Se_{8}			monoclinic	Cc	a = 7.122 b = 12.527 c = 18.666 β = 96.06° Z = 4				
Rb_{3}AuP_{2}Se_{8}			monoclinic	Cc					
Cs_{3}AuP_{2}Se_{8}			monoclinic	Cc					
K_{2}Au_{2}P_{2}Se_{6}			monoclinic	C2/m	a = 12.289 b = 7.210 c = 8.107 β = 115.13° Z = 2			black	
Rb_{2}Au_{2}P_{2}Se_{6}			monoclinic	C2/m					
Rb_{2}Au_{2}P_{2}Se_{6}			monoclinic	P2_{1}/n	a=11.961 b=10.069 c=32.137 β=91.37° Z=12	3869	4.653	@-120 °C black	
Hg_{2}P_{2}Se_{6}								band gap 2 eV	
K_{2}HgP_{2}Se_{6}			monoclinic	P2_{1}/c	a=13.031 b=7.308 c=14.167 β=110.63° Z=4	1262.6	4.285	dark yellow	
Rb_{2}HgP_{2}Se_{6}			monoclinic	P2_{1}/c				drak yellow	
Rb_{8}Hg_{4}(Se_{2})(PSe_{4})_{4}				P4_{2}/n	a=17.654 c=7.226				
Tl_{4}P_{2}Se_{6}			trigonal	R3	a=6.3808 c= 20.014			melt 963 K	
TlInP_{2}Se_{6}			triclinic	P1̅	a=6.4488 b=7.5420 c=12.166 α=100.72° β=93.63° γ=113.32°			melt 875K	
TlSbP_{2}Se_{6}			monoclinic	P2_{1}	a = 6.843 b = 7.841 c = 9.985 β = 90.77° Z = 2			melt 720K; band gap 1.75 eV	
Pb_{2}P_{2}Se_{6}			monoclinic	Pn	a = 9.742 b = 7.662 c = 6.898 β=91.44° Z=2	514.73	6.13	melt 812 °C;band gap 1.88 eV; photoconductor	
Na_{1.5}Pb_{0.75}PSe_{4}			cubic	I43d	a=14.3479 Z=16			band gap 2 eV	
RbPbPSe_{4}								red water stable	
Rb_{4}Pb(PSe_{4})_{2}			orthorhombic	Ibam	a = 19.134 b = 9.369 c = 10.488 Z = 4			orange water unstable	
CsPbPSe_{4}			orthorhombic	Pnma	a = 18.607 b = 7.096 c = 6.612 Z = 4			red water stable	
Cs_{4}Pb(PSe_{4})_{2}								orange water unstable	
Bi_{4}(P_{2}Se_{6})_{3}			monoclinic	P2_{1}/n	a = 20.869 b = 7.4745 c = 9.5923 β = 91.73°				
β-Bi_{4}(P_{2}Se_{6})_{3}			triclinic	P1̅	a = 12.2303 b = 6.7640 c = 17.866 α = 90.493° β = 94.133° γ = 91.163°			black	
KBiP_{2}Se_{6}		783.78	monoclinic	P2_{1}	a 6.9183 b 7.663 c 10.239 β 91.508° Z=2	542.6	4.797		
CuBiP_{2}Se_{6}				R3̅	a = 6.553 c = 39.76			lamellar; p-type semiconductor; work function 5.26 eV	
AgBiP_{2}Se_{6}				R3̅	a = 6.652 c = 39.61			lamellar	
Cs_{5}BiP_{4}Se_{12}			orthorhombic	Pmc2_{1}	a = 7.5357 b = 13.7783 c = 28.0807 Z = 4			band gap 1.85 eV; melt 590 °C	
α-TlBiP_{2}Se_{6}			monoclinic	P2_{l}/c	a =12.539 b =7.499 c =12.248 β =113.731°			chains; band gap 1.23,1eV	
β-TlBiP_{2}Se_{6}			monoclinic	P2_{l}/c	a =12.25 b =7.5518 c =22.834 β =97.65°			melt 544 °C; layers; band gap 1.27 eV	
K_{2}ThP_{3}Se_{9}			triclinic	P1̅	a = 10.4582 b = 16.5384 c = 10.2245 α = 107.637 β = 91.652 γ = 90.343° Z = 2				
β-K_{2}ThP_{3}Se_{9}			monoclinic	P2_{1}/n	a = 10.2697 b = 7.7765 c = 20.472 β = 92.877° Z = 4			yellow	
Rb_{2}ThP_{3}Se_{9}			triclinic	P1̅	a = 10.5369 b = 16.6914, c = 10.2864 α = 107.614° β = 92.059° γ = 90.409° Z = 2				
Rb_{7}Th_{2}P_{6}Se_{21}			triclinic	P1̅	a = 11.531 b = 12.359 c = 16.161 α = 87.289° β = 75.903° γ = 88.041° Z = 2			red; band gap 2.0 eV	
Cs_{4}Th_{4}P_{4}Se_{26}			orthorhombic	Pbca	a = 12.0130 b = 14.5747 c = 27.134 Z = 8			orange; (P_{2}Se_{9})^{6-} anion	
Cs_{4}Th_{2}P_{5}Se_{17}			monoclinic	P2_{l}/c	a = 10.238 b = 32.182 c = 10.749 β = 95.832° Z = 4				
K_{2}UP_{3}Se_{9}			triclinic	P1̅	a = 10.407( b = 16.491 c = 10.143 α= 107.51° β = 91.74° γ = 90.28° Z = 4			black	
Rb_{4}U_{2}P_{5}Se_{17}			triclinic	P1̅	a =10.0824 b = 10.6905 c = 15.7845 α = 84.678 β = 76.125 γ = 85.874°			@100K	
Rb_{4}U_{4}P_{4}Se_{26}		3470.84	orthorhombic	Pbca	a=11.9779 b=14.4874 c=27.1377 Z=4	4709.17	4.895	U^{5+}	
Cs_{2}U_{2}(P_{2}Se_{9})(Se_{2})_{2}			orthorhombic	Pbca	a 11.769 b 14.389 c 26.537			black	

== Extra reading ==
- Wang, Fengmei; Shifa, Tofik A.; Yu, Peng; He, Peng; Liu, Yang; Wang, Feng; Wang, Zhenxing; Zhan, Xueying; Lou, Xiaoding; Xia, Fan; He, Jun (September 2018). "New Frontiers on van der Waals Layered Metal Phosphorous Trichalcogenides". Advanced Functional Materials. 28 (37) 1802151. Bibcode:2018AdvFM..2802151W. doi:10.1002/adfm.201802151. hdl:10278/3742841. ISSN 1616-301X. S2CID 105564142.
- Samal, Rutuparna; Sanyal, Gopal; Chakraborty, Brahmananda; Rout, Chandra Sekhar (2021). "Two-dimensional transition metal phosphorous trichalcogenides (MPX 3 ): a review on emerging trends, current state and future perspectives". Journal of Materials Chemistry A. 9 (5): 2560–2591. doi:10.1039/D0TA09752G. ISSN 2050-7488. S2CID 233958469.
- Susner, Michael A.; Chyasnavichyus, Marius; McGuire, Michael A.; Ganesh, Panchapakesan; Maksymovych, Petro (October 2017). "Metal Thio- and Selenophosphates as Multifunctional van der Waals Layered Materials". Advanced Materials. 29 (38) 1602852. Bibcode:2017AdM....2902852S. doi:10.1002/adma.201602852. ISSN 0935-9648. OSTI 1842642. PMID 28833546. S2CID 31497995.
- Chen, Zi-Xia; Liu, Wenlong; Guo, Sheng-Ping (January 2023). "A review of structures and physical properties of rare earth chalcophosphates". Coordination Chemistry Reviews. 474 214870. doi:10.1016/j.ccr.2022.214870. S2CID 252869394.
- Li, Zhuang; Yao, Jiyong; Wu, Yicheng (4 November 2020). "Chalcophosphates: A Treasure House of Infrared Nonlinear Optical Materials". Crystal Growth & Design. 20 (11): 7550–7564. Bibcode:2020CrGrD..20.7550L. doi:10.1021/acs.cgd.0c01234. S2CID 226340520.
