= (Pyruvate, phosphate dikinase)-phosphate phosphotransferase =

Class of enzymes

Identifiers
- EC no.: 2.7.4.27

Databases
- BRENDA: enzyme data
- ExPASy: NiceZyme view
- KEGG: enzyme entry
- MetaCyc: metabolic pathway
- Rhea: reactions
- PDB structures: RCSB PDB PDBe PDBsum
Search
- PMC: articles
- PubMed: articles
- NCBI: proteins

(Pyruvate, phosphate dikinase)-phosphate phosphotransferase (EC 2.7.4.27, PPDK regulatory protein, pyruvate, phosphate dikinase regulatory protein, bifunctional dikinase regulatory protein, PDRP1 (gene)) is an enzyme with systematic name (pyruvate, phosphate dikinase) phosphate:phosphate phosphotransferase. This enzyme catalyses the following chemical reaction

[pyruvate, phosphate dikinase] phosphate + phosphate $\rightleftharpoons$ [pyruvate, phosphate dikinase] + diphosphate

The enzyme from the plants maize and arabidopsis is bifunctional and also catalyses the phosphorylation of pyruvate (EC 2.7.11.32).
