= (Pyruvate, phosphate dikinase) kinase =

Class of enzymes

Identifiers
- EC no.: 2.7.11.32

Databases
- IntEnz: IntEnz view
- BRENDA: BRENDA entry
- ExPASy: NiceZyme view
- KEGG: KEGG entry
- MetaCyc: metabolic pathway
- PRIAM: profile
- PDB structures: RCSB PDB PDBe PDBsum
Search
- PMC: articles
- PubMed: articles
- NCBI: proteins

(Pyruvate, phosphate dikinase) kinase (EC 2.7.11.32, PPDK regulatory protein, pyruvate, phosphate dikinase regulatory protein, bifunctional dikinase regulatory protein) is an enzyme with systematic name ADP:(pyruvate, phosphate dikinase) phosphotransferase. This enzyme catalyses the following chemical reaction

ADP + [pyruvate, phosphate dikinase] $\rightleftharpoons$ AMP + [pyruvate, phosphate dikinase] phosphate

This enzyme is isolated from the plants Zea mays (maize) and arabidopsis.
