= Phosphotransferase =

Class of enzymes that catalyze phosphorylation

In biochemistry, phosphotransferases are enzymes that catalyze phosphorylations (addition of inorganic phosphate, abbreviated P, to some substrate).

A^{−}P + B ⇌ B^{−}P + A

Two kinds of phosphotransferases are kinases where ATP donates P and phosphorylases where inorganic phosphate is the P donor.

== Classification ==
The transferase family of enzymes: EC number 2.7 Phosphotransferases are generally classified according to the acceptor molecule.

- EC 2.7.1 Phosphotransferases with an alcohol group as acceptor
- EC 2.7.2 Phosphotransferases with a carboxy group as acceptor
- EC 2.7.3 Phosphotransferases with a nitrogenous group as acceptor
- EC 2.7.4 Phosphotransferases with a phosphate group as acceptor
- EC 2.7.9 Phosphotransferases with paired acceptors. In these reactions, a single triphosphate-nucleotide transfers two phosphates to two different acceptor molecules, resulting in a monophosphate-nucleotide and two phosphorylated products.

== Phosphotransferase system ==
The phosphotransferase system (PTS) is a complex group translocation system present in many bacteria. The PTS transports sugars (such as glucose, mannose, and mannitol) into the cell. The first step of this reaction is phosphorylation of the substrate via phosphotransferase during transport. In the case of glucose, the product of this phosphorylation is glucose-6-phosphate (Glc-6P). Due to the negative charge of the phosphate, this Glc-6P can no longer freely leave the cell. This is the first reaction of glycolysis, which degrades the sugar to pyruvate.

== See also ==
- Kinase
- Phosphorylase
- Diphosphotransferase
