= MRI contrast agent =

Types of contrast agents used for magnetic resonance imaging

Real-time MRI of a child swallowing pineapple juice whose naturally high content in paramagnetic manganese allows it to be used as an MRI contrast agent

MRI contrast agents are contrast agents used to improve the visibility of internal body structures in magnetic resonance imaging (MRI). The most commonly used compounds for contrast enhancement are gadolinium-based contrast agents (GBCAs). Such MRI contrast agents shorten the relaxation times of nuclei within body tissues following oral or intravenous administration.

== Theory of operation ==
In MRI scanners, sections of the body are exposed to a strong magnetic field causing primarily the ^{1}H hydrogen nuclei ("spins") of water in tissues to be polarized in the direction of the magnetic field. An intense radiofrequency pulse is applied that tips the magnetization generated by the hydrogen nuclei in the direction of the receiver coil where the spin polarization can be detected. Random molecular rotational oscillations matching the resonance frequency of the nuclear spins provide the "relaxation" mechanisms that bring the net magnetization back to its equilibrium position in alignment with the applied magnetic field. The magnitude of the spin polarization detected by the receiver is used to form the MR image but decays with a characteristic time constant known as the T1 relaxation time. Water protons in different tissues have different T1 values, which is one of the main sources of contrast in MR images. A contrast agent usually shortens, but in some instances increases, the value of T1 of nearby water protons thereby altering the contrast in the image.

Most clinically used MRI contrast agents work by shortening the T1 relaxation time of protons inside tissues via interactions with the nearby contrast agent. Thermally driven motion of the strongly paramagnetic metal ions in the contrast agent generate the oscillating magnetic fields that provide the relaxation mechanisms that enhance the rate of decay of the induced polarization. The systematic sampling of this polarization over the spatial region of the tissue being examined forms the basis for construction of the image.

MRI contrast agents may be administered by injection into the blood stream or orally, depending on the subject of interest. Oral administration is well suited to gastrointestinal tract scans, while intravascular administration proves more useful for most other scans.

MRI contrast agents can be classified by their:

- Chemical composition
- Administration route
- Magnetic properties
- Biodistribution and applications:
  - Extracellular fluid agents (intravenous contrast agents)
  - Blood pool agents (intravascular contrast agents)
  - Organ specific agents (gastrointestinal contrast agents and hepatobiliary contrast agents)
  - Active targeting/cell labeling agents (tumor-specific agents)
  - Responsive (smart or bioactivated) agents
  - pH-sensitive agents

== Gadolinium(III) ==
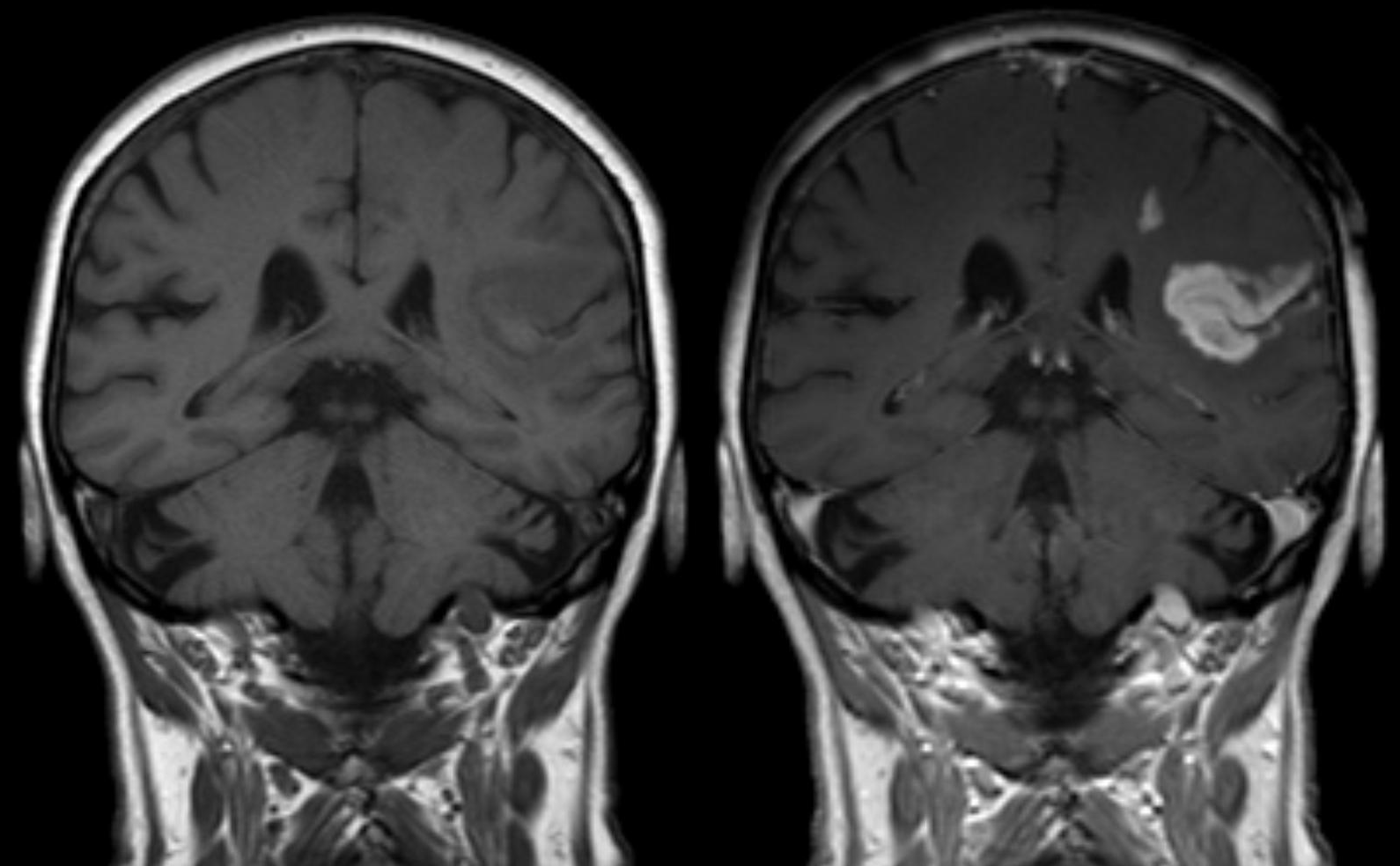
Effect of contrast agent on images: Defect of the blood–brain barrier after stroke shown in MRI. T_{1}-weighted images, left image without, right image with contrast medium administration.

Gadolinium(III) containing MRI contrast agents (often termed simply "gado" or "gad") are the most commonly used for enhancement of vessels in MR angiography or for brain tumor enhancement associated with the degradation of the blood–brain barrier (BBB). Over 450 million doses have been administered worldwide from 1988 to 2017. For large vessels such as the aorta and its branches, the dose can be as low as 0.1 mmol/kg of body mass, or half that if gadopiclenol or gadoquatrane are used. Higher concentrations are often used for finer vasculature. At much higher concentration, there is more T2 shortening effect of gadolinium, causing gadolinium brightness to be less than surrounding body tissues. However at such concentration, it will cause greater toxicity to bodily tissues.

Gd^{3+} chelates are hydrophilic and do not readily cross the intact blood–brain barrier. Thus, they are useful in enhancing lesions and tumors where the blood–brain barrier is compromised and the Gd(III) leaks out. (Note: "Disruption of the BBB tight junctions is thought to be an early or initiating event in new MS lesion formation. T1-w MRI in combination with low molecular weight gadolinium-based contrast agents (GBCA) is most typically used to characterize BBB compromise in MS. MRI GBCAs do not readily cross cellular membranes, are avid extracellular space markers, and are thought to enter the brain from the blood by diffusive transport between endothelial cells (ie, via intercellular pathways). Although it is widely believed that the MRI GBCAs do not cross the BBB under homeostatic conditions, there is substantial evidence that they do, albeit with very small volume transfer rate constants." — Bagnato, Gauthier, Laule, et al. (2020)) In the rest of the body, the Gd^{3+} initially remains in the circulation but then distributes into the interstitial space or is eliminated by the kidneys.

The first gadolinium-based contrast agent (GBCA), gadopentetate dimeglumine (Magnevist), was approved nearly simultaneously by the EMA and by the FDA in the late 1980's. (standard dose)): However, beginning in 2017, the EMA restricted several older linear gadolinium contrast agents that had previously been approved for human use in the EU.

=== Extracellular fluid agents ===
- Macrocyclic
  - ionic
    - gadoterate (Dotarem, Clariscan): EMA, FDA (SD: 0.1 mmol/kg)
  - non-ionic
    - gadobutrol (Gadovist [EU] / Gadavist [US]): EMA, FDA (SD: 0.1 mmol/kg)
    - gadoteridol (ProHance): EMA, FDA (SD: 0.1 mmol/kg)
    - gadopiclenol (Elucirem, Vueway): EMA, FDA (SD: 0.05 mmol/kg)
    - gadoquatrane (Ambelvist): FDA (SD: 0.01 mmol/kg)
- Linear (suspended by EMA)
  - ionic
    - gadopentetate (Magnevist, EU: Magnegita, Gado-MRT ratiopharm): FDA (SD: 0.1 mmol/kg)
    - gadobenate (MultiHance): FDA, EMA (liver) (SD: 0.1 mmol/kg)
    - gadopentetic acid dimeglumine (Magnetol)
    - gadoxetate (Eovist, EU: Primovist): FDA (SD: 0.025 mmol/kg)
  - non-ionic
    - gadoversetamide (OptiMARK): FDA (SD: 0.1 mmol/kg)
    - gadodiamide (Omniscan): FDA (SD: 0.1 mmol/kg)

=== Blood pool agents ===
- Albumin-binding gadolinium complexes
  - gadofosveset (Ablavar, formerly Vasovist): FDA (SD: 0.1 mmol/kg)
  - gadocoletic acid
- Polymeric gadolinium complexes
  - gadomelitol
  - gadomer 17

=== Hepatobiliary (liver) agents ===
- gadoxetic acid (Primovist [EU] / Eovist [US]) is used as a hepatobiliary agent as 50% is taken up and excreted by the liver and 50% by the kidneys.

=== Safety ===
The use of Gd^{3+} chelates in persons with acute or chronic kidney disease can cause nephrogenic systemic fibrosis (NSF), a rare but severe systemic disease resembling scleromyxedema and to some extent scleroderma. It may occur months after contrast injection. Patients with severely deteriorated kidney function are more at risk for NSF, with dialysis patients being more at risk than patients with mild chronic kidney disease. NSF can be caused by linear and macrocyclic gadolinium-containing MRI contrast agents, although macrocyclic ionic compounds have been found the least likely to release the Gd^{3+}.

While NSF is a severe form of disease, gadolinium deposition disease (GDD) is a mild variant with pain (e.g. headache), fatigue, and / or gadolinium depositions.

As a free solubilized aqueous ion, gadolinium(III) is highly toxic, but the chelated compounds are relatively safe for individuals without kidney disease. Free Gd^{3+} has a median lethal dose of 0.34 mmol/kg (IV, mouse) or 100–200 mg/kg, but the LD50 is increased by a factor of 31 times when Gd^{3+} is chelated.

The spectrum of adverse drug reactions is greater with gadolinium-based contrast agents than with iodinated contrast agents (radiocontrast agents).

Gadolinium has been found to remain in the brain, heart muscle, kidney, liver, and other organs after one or more injections of a linear or macrocyclic gadolinium-based contrast agents, even after a prolonged period of time. The amount differs with the presence of kidney injury at the moment of injection, the molecular geometry of the ligand, and the dose administered.

In vitro studies have found gadolinium-based contrast agents to be neurotoxic, and a study found signal intensity in the dentate nucleus of MRI (indicative of gadolinium deposition) to be correlated with lower verbal fluency. Confusion is often reported as a possible clinical symptom. The FDA has asked doctors to limit the use of gadolinium contrast agents to examinations where necessary information is obtained only through its use. Intrathecal injections of doses higher than 1 mmol are associated with severe neurological complications and can lead to death. The glymphatic system could be the main access of GBCA to the brain in intravenous injection.

Continuing evidence of the retention of gadolinium in brain and other tissues following exposure to gadolinium containing contrast media, led to a safety review by the Committee for Medicinal Products for Human Use (CHMP) which led the EMA to restrict or suspend authorization for the intravenous use of most brands of linear gadolinium-based media, in which Gd^{3+} has a lower binding affinity, in 2017.

In the United States, the research has led the FDA to revise its class warnings for gadolinium-based contrast media. It is advised that the use of gadolinium-based media should be based on careful consideration of the retention characteristics of the contrast, with extra care being taken in patients requiring multiple lifetime doses, pregnant, and paediatric patients, and patients with inflammatory conditions. They also advise minimizing repeated GBCA imaging studies when possible, particularly closely spaced MRI studies, but not avoiding or deferring necessary GBCA MRI scans.

In December 2017, the FDA announced that it was requiring these warnings to be included on all GBCAs. The FDA also called for increased patient education and requiring gadolinium contrast vendors to conduct additional animal and clinical studies to assess the safety of these agents.

The French health authority recommends to use the lowest possible dose of a GBCA and only when essential diagnostic information cannot be obtained without it.

The World Health Organization issued a restriction on use of several gadolinium contrast agents in November 2009 stating that "High-risk gadolinium-containing contrast agents (Optimark, Omniscan, Magnevist, Magnegita, and Gado-MRT ratiopharm) are contraindicated in patients with severe kidney problems, in patients who are scheduled for or have recently received a liver transplant, and in newborn babies up to four weeks of age."

In magnetic resonance imaging in pregnancy, gadolinium contrast agents in the first trimester is associated with a slightly increased risk of a childhood diagnosis of several forms of rheumatism, inflammatory disorders, or infiltrative skin conditions, according to a retrospective study including 397 infants prenatally exposed to gadolinium contrast. In the second and third trimester, gadolinium contrast is associated with a slightly increased risk of stillbirth or neonatal death, by the same study.

Guidelines from the Canadian Association of Radiologists are that dialysis patients should receive gadolinium agents only where essential and that they should receive dialysis after the exam. If a contrast-enhanced MRI must be performed on a dialysis patient, it is recommended that certain high-risk contrast agents be avoided but not that a lower dose be considered. The American College of Radiology recommends that contrast-enhanced MRI examinations be performed as closely before dialysis as possible as a precautionary measure, although this has not been proven to reduce the likelihood of developing NSF. The FDA recommends that potential for gadolinium retention be considered when choosing the type of GBCA used in patients requiring multiple lifetime doses, pregnant women, children, and patients with inflammatory conditions.

Anaphylactoid reactions are rare, occurring in about 0.03–0.1%.

== Iron oxide: superparamagnetic ==
Two types of iron oxide contrast agents exist: superparamagnetic iron oxide (SPIO) and ultrasmall superparamagnetic iron oxide (USPIO). These contrast agents consist of suspended colloids of iron oxide nanoparticles and when injected during imaging reduce the T_{2} signals of absorbing tissues. SPIO and USPIO contrast agents have been used successfully in some instances for liver lesion evaluation.

- Feridex I.V. (also known as Endorem and ferumoxides). This product was discontinued by AMAG Pharma in November 2008.
- Resovist (also known as Cliavist). This was approved for the European market in 2001, but production was abandoned in 2009.
- Sinerem (also known as Combidex). Guerbet withdrew the marketing authorization application for this product in 2007.
- Lumirem (also known as Gastromark). Gastromark was approved by the FDA in 1996 and was discontinued by its manufacturer in 2012.
- Clariscan (also known as PEG-fero, Feruglose, and NC100150). This iron based contrast agent was never commercially launched and its development was discontinued in early 2000s due to safety concerns. In 2017 GE Healthcare launched a macrocyclic extracellular gadolinium based contrast agent containing gadoteric acid as gadoterate meglumine under the trade name Clariscan.

== Iron platinum: superparamagnetic ==
Superparamagnetic iron–platinum particles (SIPPs) have been reported and had significantly better T_{2} relaxivities compared with the more common iron oxide nanoparticles. SIPPs were also encapsulated with phospholipids to create multifunctional SIPP stealth immunomicelles that specifically targeted human prostate cancer cells. These are, however, investigational agents which have not yet been tried in humans. In a recent study, multifunctional SIPP micelles were synthesized and conjugated to a monoclonal antibody against prostate-specific membrane antigen. The complex specifically targeted human prostate cancer cells in vitro, and these results suggest that SIPPs may have a role in the future as tumor-specific contrast agents.

== Manganese ==
Manganese(II) chelates such as Mn-DPDP (mangafodipir) enhance the T_{1} signal. The chelate dissociates in vivo into manganese and DPDP; the manganese is excreted in bile, while DPDP is eliminated via kidney filtration. Mangafodipir has been used in human neuroimaging clinical trials, including for neurodegenerative diseases such as multiple sclerosis. Manganese(II) ions are often used as a contrast agent in animal studies, often called MEMRI (manganese-enhanced MRI). Because Mn^{2+} ions can enter cells through calcium transport channels, it has been used for functional brain imaging.

The first patient dose of the new manganese-based contrast agent Mangaciclanol was announced in April 2026.

Manganese(III) chelates with porphyrins and phthalocyanines have also been studied.

Unlike the other well-studied iron oxide-based nanoparticles, research on Mn-based nanoparticles is at a relatively early stage.

== Oral administration ==
A wide variety of oral contrast agents can enhance images of the gastrointestinal tract. They include gadolinium and manganese chelates, or iron salts for T_{1} signal enhancement. SPIO, barium sulfate, air and clay have been used to lower T_{2} signal. Natural products with high manganese concentration such as blueberry and green tea can also be used for T_{1} increasing contrast enhancement.

Perflubron, a type of perfluorocarbon, has been used as a gastrointestinal MRI contrast agent for pediatric imaging. This contrast agent works by reducing the number of hydrogen ions in a body cavity, thus causing it to appear dark in the images.

== Protein-based MRI contrast agents ==
Newer research suggests the possibility of protein based contrast agents, based on the abilities of some amino acids to bind with gadolinium.

== See also ==
- Lanthanide probes
