= MRV =

MRV can refer to:

- Magnetic resonance venography, a variation of magnetic resonance angiography
- Magnetic resonance velocimetry, an experimental method to obtain velocity fields in fluid mechanics
- Mammalian orthoreovirus
- Medium reconnaissance vehicle, an Australian M113 armored personnel carrier variant
- Merovingian Music, a record label
- The IATA code for Mineralnye Vody Airport
- Mini-rotary viscometer
- Monitoring, reporting and verification, a concept in the REDD+ climate change mitigation framework
- MRV Communications, an American company
- MRV Engenharia, a Brazilian homebuilder company
- Multiple reentry vehicle
- Roll Flight MR V, a German powered parachute design
