= SH 1040 =

SH 1040 or SH-1040 may refer to the following:

- Gestaclone, a developmental code name for a steroidal progestin
- List of highways numbered 1040, a list of routes or highways that are numbered 1040
