= Streptomyces pseudogriseolus =

Scientific classification
- Domain: Bacteria
- Kingdom: Bacillati
- Phylum: Actinomycetota
- Class: Actinomycetes
- Order: Streptomycetales
- Family: Streptomycetaceae
- Genus: Streptomyces
- Species: S. pseudogriseolus

Binomial name
- Streptomyces pseudogriseolus Okami and Umezawa 1955

Type strain
- ATCC 12770, ATCC 23949, BCRC 12132, CBS 933.68, CCRC 12132, CGMCC 4.1800, DSM 40026, ETH 24342, ETH 28345, IFO 12902, ISP 5026, JCM 4071, JCM 4663, KCC S-0071, KCCS-0071, KCCS-0152, LMG 20252, NBRC 12902, NCIB 9411, NCIB 9814, NCIM 2618, NCIMB 9411, NCIMB 9814, NIHJ 224, NIHJ H-16c, NRRL B-3288, NRRL-ISP 5026, Okami H-16C, OkamiH-16c, PSA 212, RIA 1106, VKM Ac-1859, VTT E-011968

Species of bacterium

Streptomyces pseudogriseolus is a bacterium species from the genus of Streptomyces which has been isolated from soil. Streptomyces pseudogriseolus produces xanthomycin, deseryladenomycin and physostigmine.

== See also ==
- List of Streptomyces species
