= Gadofosveset =

Chemical compound

Gadofosveset trisodium

Clinical data
- Trade names: Vasovist, Ablavar
- Routes of administration: Intravenous
- ATC code: V08CA11 (WHO)

Legal status
- Legal status: US: ℞-only

Identifiers
- IUPAC name: Trisodium 2-{[(2R)-2-[bis(2-oxido-2-oxoethyl)amino]-3-[(4,4-diphenylcyclohexyl)oxy-oxidophosphoryl]oxypropyl]-[2-[bis(2-oxido-2-oxoethyl)amino]ethyl]amino}acetate
- CAS Number: 211570-55-7 193901-90-5 (anhydrous)
- PubChem CID: 158440
- DrugBank: DB06705
- ChemSpider: 139381
- UNII: XM33Q67UVH
- KEGG: D08005

Chemical and physical data
- Formula: C_{33}H_{40}GdN_{3}Na_{3}O_{15}P
- Molar mass: 975.88 g·mol^{−1}
- 3D model (JSmol): Interactive image
- SMILES: [Gd+3].[Na+].[Na+].[Na+].[O-]C(=O)CN(CC([O-])=O)CCN(CC([O-])=O)C[C@@H](N(CC([O-])=O)CC([O-])=O)COP([O-])(=O)OC3CCC(c1ccccc1)(c2ccccc2)CC3.O
- InChI: InChI=1S/C33H44N3O14P.Gd.3Na.H2O/c37-28(38)18-34(15-16-35(19-29(39)40)20-30(41)42)17-26(36(21-31(43)44)22-32(45)46)23-49-51(47,48)50-27-11-13-33(14-12-27,24-7-3-1-4-8-24)25-9-5-2-6-10-25;;;;;/h1-10,26-27H,11-23H2,(H,37,38)(H,39,40)(H,41,42)(H,43,44)(H,45,46)(H,47,48);;;;;1H2/q;+3;3*+1;/p-6/t26-;;;;;/m1...../s1; Key:PIZALBORPSCYJU-QSQMUHTISA-H

Gadofosveset (trade names Vasovist, Ablavar) is a gadolinium-based MRI contrast agent. It was used as the trisodium salt monohydrate form. It acts as a blood pool agent by binding to human serum albumin. The manufacturer (Lantheus Medical) discontinued production in 2017 due to poor sales.

Gadofosveset consists of a gadolinium cation bound to the chelating agent fosveset. It facilitates high-resolution magnetic resonance angiography. Ferumoxytol (trade names Feraheme, Rienso), an intravenous iron-replacement therapy, has been shown to potentially be superior to gadofosveset as a blood pool agent for MR venography in pediatric patients.
