= Blood pool agent =

Class of magnetic resonance angiography contrast agents

Blood pool agents (BPAs) are a class of magnetic resonance angiography contrast agents. Blood pool agents (also known as intravascular contrast agents) are differentiated from other contrast agents due to their high molecular weight and higher relaxivities. Their large size prevents diffusion through the vascular epithelium and leakage into the interstitial space, and because of this they stay in the vascular system for a longer time period. Most contrast agents, leave the vascular system within a few minutes, however blood pool agents remain in the circulation for up to an hour, extending the window available for imaging. Longer image acquisition times allow better signal-to-noise ratio and improved image resolution.

== Roles of blood pool agents ==
Due to their extended time in the circulatory system, blood pool agents can be used for delayed steady-state imaging, and additionally these results can be combined with first pass arterial imaging.

== Classes of blood pool agents ==
=== Albumin-binding gadolinium complexes ===
This class of BPAs is based on the noncovalent binding of low molecular weight Gd^{3+}-based complexes to human serum albumin. The first commercial agent to be approved in this class is gadofosveset trisodium (also known as Vasovist or Ablavar, and previously known as MS-325). Many clinical and case studies documenting the use of this BPA have been published, and its efficacy in enhancing blood vessels visibility has been demonstrated. The manufacturer (Lantheus Medical) discontinued production in 2017 though, due to poor sales.

Gadocoletic acid (Bracco SpA), also known as B-22956 and B22956/1, is a Gd-DTPA derivative that is currently in development, but has not yet been approved for clinical use.

Gadobenic acid (MultiHance) is sometimes categorized as a BPA; however, as it only binds weakly to albumin and because hepatobiliary uptake of this compound occurs, this contrast agent should not be classified as a BPA.

=== Polymeric gadolinium complexes ===
Polymeric Gd^{3+} chelates are large in size, which prevents leakage into the interstitial space, and provides long imaging windows. Several polymeric gadolinium-based BPAs are currently in development but have not yet been approved for clinical use: Gadomelitol (Guerbet, France), also known as Vistarem and P792 Gadomer-17 (Schering AG, Berlin, Germany) also known as Gd-DTPA-17, SH L 643 A.
