= Gadoteric acid =

Chemical compound

Clinical data
- Trade names: Artirem, Dotarem, Clariscan, others
- Other names: DOTA-Gd, Gadoterate meglumine (USAN US)
- AHFS/Drugs.com: International Drug Names
- License data: US DailyMed: Gadoterate meglumine
- Routes of administration: Intravenous
- ATC code: V08CA02 (WHO)

Legal status
- Legal status: CA: ℞-only; UK: POM (Prescription only); US: ℞-only; EU: Rx-only; In general: ℞ (Prescription only)

Identifiers
- IUPAC name: gadolinium(3+) 2-[4,7,10-tris(carboxymethyl)-1,4,7,10-tetraazacyclododecan-1-yl]acetate
- CAS Number: 72573-82-1
- PubChem CID: 158536
- DrugBank: DB09132
- ChemSpider: 139460
- UNII: QVF9Y6955W
- KEGG: D08007
- ChEBI: CHEBI:73732
- ChEMBL: ChEMBL3833326
- CompTox Dashboard (EPA): DTXSID801027873 DTXSID001003675, DTXSID801027873

Chemical and physical data
- Formula: C_{16}H_{25}GdN_{4}O_{8}
- Molar mass: 558.65 g·mol^{−1}
- 3D model (JSmol): Interactive image
- SMILES: [Gd+3].OC(=O)CN1CCN(CC([O-])=O)CCN(CC([O-])=O)CCN(CC([O-])=O)CC1
- InChI: InChI=1S/C16H28N4O8.Gd/c21-13(22)9-17-1-2-18(10-14(23)24)5-6-20(12-16(27)28)8-7-19(4-3-17)11-15(25)26;/h1-12H2,(H,21,22)(H,23,24)(H,25,26)(H,27,28);/q;+3/p-3; Key:GFSTXYOTEVLASN-UHFFFAOYSA-K

Gadoteric acid, sold under the brand name Dotarem among others, is a macrocycle-structured gadolinium-based MRI contrast agent (GBCA). It consists of the organic acid DOTA as a chelating agent, and gadolinium (Gd^{3+}), and is used in form of the meglumine salt (gadoterate meglumine). The paramagnetic property of gadoteric acid reduces the T1 relaxation time (and to some extent the T2 and T2* relaxation times) in MRI, which is the source of its clinical utility. Because it has magnetic properties, gadoteric acid develops a magnetic moment when put under a magnetic field, which increases the signal intensity (brightness) of tissues during MRI imaging.

== Medical uses ==
It is widely used in the United States for Breast MRI imaging for women who have or are suspected to have breast cancer. It is also used for imaging of blood vessels and inflamed or diseased tissue where the blood vessels become 'leaky'. It is often used when viewing intracranial lesions with abnormal vascularity or abnormalities in the blood–brain barrier. Gadoteric acid is used for MRI imaging of the brain, spine, and associated tissues for adult and pediatric (2 years of age or older) patients. The meglumine salt it takes the form of crosses the blood brain barrier of tissue with abnormal vasculature, highlighting the affected area with MRI. Gadoterate does cross the intact blood-brain barrier, so it might affect or enhance normal brain tissue in imaging. Dotarem is administered through an intravenous bolus injection, either manually or through a power injection. Dotarem can stay in the body for years.

== Adverse effects ==
It is retained in the brain at a measurable level after an injection at standard dose (0.1 mmol/kg). In vitro studies found it neurotoxic, less so than linears agents.

Drugs with gadolinium-based contrasting agents can cause nephrogenic systemic fibrosis (NSF, or gadolinium-induced fibrosis) for those with impaired elimination of the drug. Those most at risk for NSF include patients with chronic or severe kidney disease and acute kidney injury.

The rate of side effects are uncommon (0.1 to 1.0%), including nausea, headache, injection site reactions, hypertension, hypotension, dizziness, feeling hot, and somnolence.

== Pharmacology ==
A 2020 study found Clariscan was retained more in the cerebrum, cerebellum, kidney and liver of rats than those injected with Dotarem.

== History ==
The drug, under the brand name Dotarem, was brought to market by Guerbet. It was launched on French market in 1989 and was FDA-approved in United States in March 2013. As of 2013, gadoteric acid was approved in around 70 countries. Dotarem is the seventh FDA-approved GBCA for use in central nervous system MRI.

In 2019, GE Healthcare launched gadoteric acid medication (as gadoterate meglumine) under the brand name Clariscan.
