= Gadobutrol =

Chemical compound

Clinical data
- Trade names: Gadovist, others
- AHFS/Drugs.com: Micromedex Detailed Consumer Information
- Routes of administration: Intravenous therapy
- ATC code: V08CA09 (WHO)

Legal status
- Legal status: CA: ℞-only; UK: POM (Prescription only); US: ℞-only; In general: ℞ (Prescription only)

Identifiers
- IUPAC name: {10-[(1RS,2SR)-2,3-dihydroxy-1-(hydroxymethyl)propyl]-1,4,7,10-tetrazacyclododecane-1,4,7-triacetato}gadolinium(III)
- CAS Number: 770691-21-9
- PubChem CID: 72057
- DrugBank: DB06703
- ChemSpider: 28536137
- UNII: 1BJ477IO2L
- KEGG: D07420
- ChEBI: CHEBI:68841

Chemical and physical data
- Formula: C_{18}H_{31}GdN_{4}O_{9}
- Molar mass: 604.72 g·mol^{−1}
- 3D model (JSmol): Interactive image
- SMILES: C1CN(CCN(CCN(CCN1CC(=O)[O-])CC(=O)[O-])[C@@H](CO)[C@H](CO)O)CC(=O)[O-].[Gd+3]
- InChI: InChI=1S/C18H34N4O9.Gd/c23-12-14(15(25)13-24)22-7-5-20(10-17(28)29)3-1-19(9-16(26)27)2-4-21(6-8-22)11-18(30)31;/h14-15,23-25H,1-13H2,(H,26,27)(H,28,29)(H,30,31);/q;+3/p-3/t14-,15-;/m0./s1; Key:ZPDFIIGFYAHNSK-YYLIZZNMSA-K

Gadobutrol (INN; Gd-DO3A-butrol), sold under the brand name Gadovist among others, is a gadolinium-based MRI contrast agent (GBCA). It received marketing approval in Canada and the United States. As of 2007, it was the only GBCA approved at 1.0 molar concentrations.

== Medical uses ==
Gadobutrol is a medicinal product used in diagnostic magnetic resonance imaging (MRI) in adults and children. It provides contrast enhancement during cranial, spinal, breast, or other investigations. In the central nervous system, gadobutrol works by highlighting any areas with disrupted blood brain barrier (BBB) and/or abnormal vascularity. In breast tissue, gadobutrol exposes the presence and extent of malignant breast disease. Similarly, gadobutrol is also used in contrast-enhanced magnetic resonance angiography (CE-MRA) for the diagnosis of stroke, detection of tumor perfusion, and presence of focal cerebral ischemia.

Gadobutrol should be administered intravenously by medical professionals only. Sterile techniques must always be used when preparing and administering the injection. When compared to other GBCAs, gadobutrol is available in a more concentrated form (1 mmol/mL) to alleviate a high volume of administration. The recommended dose is 0.1 mL/kg body weight.

== Adverse effects ==
The safety of gadobutrol was assessed throughout clinical trials and post-marketing, for multiple applications, in diverse populations and at multiple doses.

The most severe reaction to gadobutrol is nephrogenic system fibrosis (NSF) among patients with impaired elimination of the drug. The risk is highest among patients with chronic, impaired kidney function and those with acute kidney injury. NSF may result in death or severe impairment of the skin, muscle, and internal organs.

Patients who have experienced a previous adverse reaction to another contrast agent, have bronchial asthma, and/or allergic disorders have an increased risk of a hypersensitivity reaction to gadobutrol. Hypersensitivity reactions can include anaphylactoid and anaphylactic reactions ranging from mild to severe. These reactions are uncommon, however, monitoring of the patient for signs and symptoms during and after administration of gadobutrol is necessary.

Other, more mild adverse reactions have been observed in a small fraction of patients after administration. These reactions can include but are not limited to the following:

- Headache
- Nausea and/or vomiting
- Injection site reactions (cold feeling, warmth, pain, or burning)
- Dysgeusia (unpleasant taste in mouth)
- Feeling hot
- Dizziness
- Rash
- Erythema (reddening of the skin)
- Dyspnea (difficulty breathing)
- Paresthesia (burning feeling)

== Use in specific populations ==
=== Pregnancy ===
The US Food and Drug Administration (FDA) has labeled gadobutrol as pregnancy category C. Sufficient studies of gadobutrol in pregnant human females have not been conducted. However, other GBCAs have been shown to cross the placenta in humans and result in fetal exposure, but do not show adverse effects to the fetus.

Animal studies have been conducted in which pregnant rats and rabbits were exposed to 12 and 8 times the human equivalent dose based on body surface area respectively. These exposures often resulted in retardation of the embryo development and embryo death. Embryo retardation did not occur in monkeys administered up to 8 times the recommended human dose but did result in embryo death. The animals were administered multiple doses repeatedly over days, therefore, their exposure levels were much higher than those experienced in humans.

Gadobutrol should only be administered in pregnant females if the potential benefit outweighs the risk to the fetus.

=== Breast-feeding ===
It is unknown the amount of gadobutrol transferred to milk in humans. Limited data exists on the excretion of other GBCAs in human breast milk, but suggest a transfer rate of 0.01% to 0.04% of the administered material to breast milk. Non-clinical data for gadrobutrol suggests that less than 0.01% is excreted into breast milk upon intravenous administration of the recommended dose. Further data suggests that absorption via the GI tract is very poor (approximately 5%). For the highest level of safety, breastfeeding should be discontinued for 24 hours upon administration of gadobutrol and any milk properly disposed of.

=== Pediatrics ===
The safety, efficacy, and pharmacokinetics have been well established in children ages 2–17 years. It was found that no adjustment of the recommended 0.1 mL/kg body weight dose was necessary.

The safety and efficacy data for children under the age of 2 years is limited but has demonstrated that use of the 0.1 mL/kg body weight dose may be used in this population. However, it is recommended that the lowest possible dose be utilized and that a period of at least 7 days in between doses be allowed for elimination of the agent from the body.

=== Geriatrics ===
Clinical data has shown that there is no difference in the safety or efficacy of gadobutrol in subjects of 65 years and older when compared with those under the age of 65 years. There are no required special precautions and/or dose adjustment for those without renal impairment.

=== Renally impaired population ===
It is recommended that renal impairment be assessed for all patients prior to administration of gadobutrol. It is not necessary to adjust the dose in these populations, however, gadobutrol will need to be removed from the body using hemodialysis.

== Interactions ==
There are no known drug interactions with gadobutrol. However, it should not be mixed with other drugs.

== Mechanism of action ==
Gadobutrol is a paramagnetic macrocyclic contrast agent administered intravenously for use in magnetic resonance imaging. The contrast-enhancing effect is a result of the neutral complex of gadolinium and dihydroxy-hydroxymethylpropyl-tetrazacyclododecane-triacetic acid (butrol), which works to decrease differences in longitudinal relaxation times (T1) and differences in spin-spin or transverse relaxation times (T2). These relaxation times, coupled with differences in proton density, are responsible for the variation in intensity of radio frequency signals which contribute to an MRI's tissue visualization capabilities. Greater signal enhancement, and therefore, greater tissue visualization, is achieved with increased shortening of T1 and T2.

== History ==
=== Commercialization ===
Gadobutrol was first approved in Switzerland in 1998 for use in contrast-enhanced MRI scans of the brain and spinal cord. Since then, it has been approved and marketed in 65 other countries including all European Union countries, the United States, Canada, Mexico, Australia, New Zealand, China, South Korea, Russia, and Brazil, for a multitude of uses. Gadobutrol was first approved for use in MRIs of the central nervous system in the United States in 2011. It is currently manufactured by Bayer Healthcare Pharmaceuticals Inc. and marketed under the brand name Gadavist. In 2015, Gadavist was approved by the FDA as the first contrast agent safe for use in children under the age of 2 years old. Most recently, in early 2016, Gadavist was approved in the United States for use in contrast-enhanced magnetic resonance angiography.

=== Research and clinical trials ===
Gadavist was approved in the United States in 2011 after presenting findings from 43 clinical studies that had primarily taken place in Asia and the European Union, in addition to one phase 2 and two phase 3 clinical trials conducted in the United States. The multi-center, randomized, double-blind phase 3 clinical trials (one completed without the active comparator arm) enrolled 402 patients referred for a contrast-enhanced MRI of the CNS, both male and female, over the age of 18. Each patient received a single dose of gadobutrol (0.1 mmol/kg body weight) via intravenous injection, followed by a single dose of gadoteridol (ProHance) at the approved dose (0.1 mmol/kg body weight) via intravenous injection, or vice versa. The study evaluated safety and efficacy of gadobutrol. From these phase 3 clinical trials, the following conclusions were made:

- Combined gadobutrol-enhanced plus unenhanced images compared to unenhanced images are:
  - Superior in diagnostic performance
  - Superior for the lesion visualization variables contrast enhancement, border delineation and internal morphology
  - Non-inferior for the number of lesions detected
- Gadobutrol was shown to be non-inferior to ProHance with respect to the visualization variables contrast enhancement, border delineation and internal morphology, as well as number of lesions detected
- Gadobutrol showed higher sensitivity than ProHance for the determination of lesion malignancy
- Gadobutrol-enhanced images were consistently favored over ProHance-enhanced images by all 3 blinded readers

Prior to approval for use in children under the age of 2 years old in 2015, a phase 1 clinical trial was conducted. Pediatric patients, scheduled for a routine contrast-enhanced MRI examination of any body region, both male and female, under the age of 2 years old could be enrolled in the study. The open-label, multi-center, pharmacokinetic and safety test studied the way gadobutrol was taken into, moved around, and was eliminated from the body of the infants. The study also evaluated safety, tolerability and efficacy of the standard dose of gadobutrol, 0.1 mmol/kg (0.1 mL/kg) of body weight. The clinical trial was sponsored by Bayer Healthcare Pharmaceuticals Inc.

Prior to approval for use in magnetic resonance angiography (MRA) in early 2006, a phase 3 clinical trial was conducted. Patients referred for a routine MRA, both male and female, over the age of 18 years old could be enrolled in the study. The open-label, multi-center, blinded reading safety and efficacy study compared diagnostic results of gadobutrol enhanced MRA images with no-contrast MRA images. Patients received a single intravenous injection of 0.1 mmol/kg gadobutrol prior to scanning. The MRA image results were then blindly read by qualified personnel. The clinical trial was sponsored by Bayer Healthcare Pharmaceuticals Inc.

=== Regulatory ===
The only US patent for gadobutrol is US5980864A, granted in November 1999, to Schering AG. The patent is for the process using 1,4,7,10-tetraazacyclododecane butyltriols to produce the gadolinium (III) complex of 10-(1-hydroxymethyl-2,3-dihydroxypropyl)-1,4,7-triscarboxymethyl-1,4,7,10-tetraazacyclododecane (gadobutrol). The patent defends the use of this metal complex as a superior diagnostic medium. In 2006, Bayer Healthcare Pharmaceuticals Inc. absorbed Schering AG, and in November 2007, the patent was transferred to Bayer Schering Pharma. After FDA approval in 2011, the patent was granted an extension of 1,470 days and the trade name Gadavist became associated with the patent. In February 2016, the patent was granted a second term extension, but expired in November 2016.

=== Packaging and purchasing ===
Gadobutrol contrast media is a clear, colorless-to-pale yellow solution of 1 mmol/mL formulation, available in single dose vials (2 mL, 7.5 mL, 10mL, and 15 mL), single dose pre-filled injections (7.5 mL, 10 mL, 15 mL), and pharmacy bulk packages (30 mL and 65 mL) containing multiple vials. Gadobutrol is currently marketed in the United States under the name Gadavist, and in most other countries under the name Gadovist or Gadovist 1.0.

In 2016 Bayer-UK published prices for the product.

=== Names ===
Gadobutrol is sold under the brand names Gadovist, Gadavist, and Pixxoscan. In India, it is sold under the brand name Viv-butrol.
