= Guerbet =

- Traded as: CAC Small
- ISIN: FR0000032526
- Founded: 1926

Guerbet (Euronext Paris: GBT ) is a France-based manufacturer of contrast agents used in medical imaging. The company was founded in 1926 by André Guerbet, the son of Marcel Guerbet who in 1901 discovered Lipiodol – the first iodinated X-ray contrast agent.

In 2017 Guerbet’s revenues were €807.1 million. It employs over 2,700 people worldwide and has manufacturing facilities in over 20 countries including France, Ireland, Canada, Macedonia, the United States and Brazil. The company’s headquarters is located in Villepinte, Seine-Saint-Denis.

In July 2015, Guerbet announced the takeover of a portion of Mallinckrodt's contrast media and application systems divisions. The acquisition was completed in November 2015.

In 2022, the United States Food and Drug Administration (FDA) approved Guerbet Group's Elucirem (Gadopiclenol), an MRI contrast agent. The product is produced at Guerbet's factory in Raleigh, North Carolina and at three of its French factories.

In 2025, the United States Food and Drug Administration cited Guerbet subsidiary Liebel-Flarsheim Company LLC for violations at its production facility in Raleigh, North Carolina, where imaging products including MRI contrast agents gadopiclenol and gadoteric acid and radiography contrast agents ioversol and iotalamic acid are manufactured. The FDA warning letter stated that there were "significant violations of Current Good Manufacturing Practice (CGMP) regulations," notifying the company that its "drug products are adulterated" and the "firm released the above batches with OOS endotoxin failures for U.S. distribution." Among findings from an FDA inspection were clean rooms and drug manufacturing systems that were in a "state of disrepair", as well as rusty equipment and "excessive caulking and tape" to patch air gaps. The company later stated that it was working with its business partners and regulators including the FDA to mitigate these issues, with a re-inspection planned for 2026. The fallout from these violations contributed to the company's 2025 operating loss of over US$100 million, and Guerbet projected that there would be "significant negative financial impact" due to destroying contaminated inventory, decreased production capacity, and compliance-related costs.
