= Phase contrast magnetic resonance imaging =

Magnetic resonance imaging to determine flow velocities

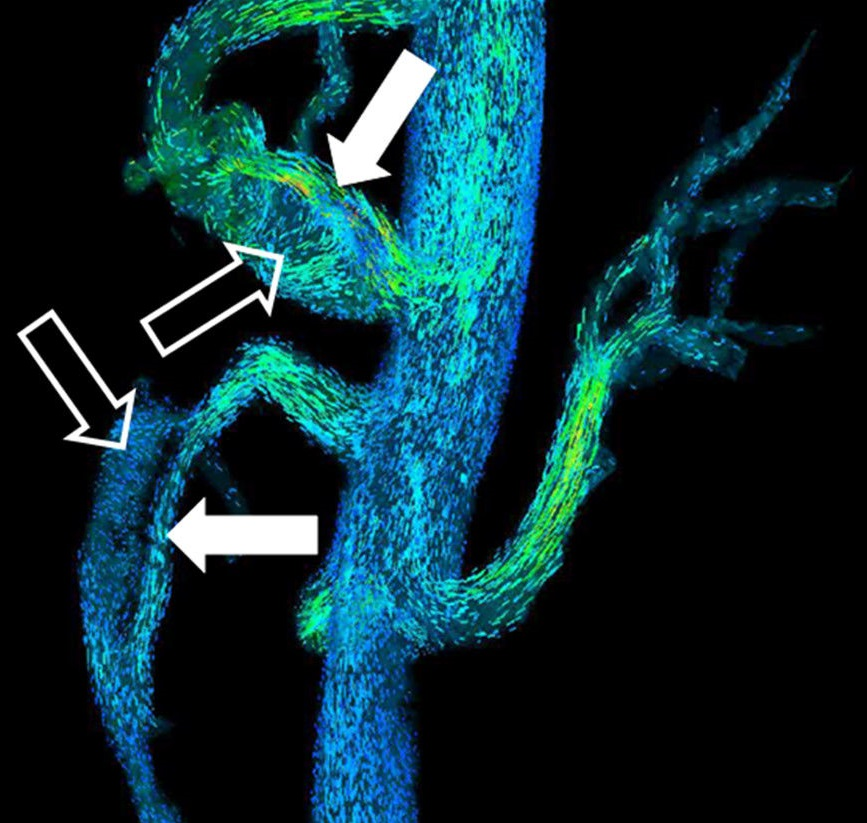
- Vastly undersampled Isotropic Projection Reconstruction (VIPR) of a phase contrast (PC) MRI sequence of a 56-year-old male with dissections of the celiac artery (upper) and the superior mesenteric artery (lower). Laminar flow is present in the true lumen (closed arrow) and helical flow is present in the false lumen (open arrow).
- Purpose: method of magnetic resonance angiograph

Phase contrast magnetic resonance imaging (PC-MRI) is a specific type of magnetic resonance imaging used primarily to determine flow velocities. PC-MRI can be considered a method of Magnetic Resonance Velocimetry. It also provides a method of magnetic resonance angiography. Since modern PC-MRI is typically time-resolved, it provides a means of 4D imaging (three spatial dimensions plus time).

== How it Works ==
Atoms with an odd number of protons or neutrons have a randomly aligned angular spin momentum. When placed in a strong magnetic field, some of these spins align with the axis of the external field, which causes a net 'longitudinal' magnetization. These spins precess about the axis of the external field at a frequency proportional to the strength of that field. Then, energy is added to the system through a Radio frequency (RF) pulse to 'excite' the spins, changing the axis that the spins precess about. These spins can then be observed by receiver coils (Radiofrequency coils) using Faraday's law of induction. Different tissues respond to the added energy in different ways, and imaging parameters can be adjusted to highlight desired tissues.

All of these spins have a phase that is dependent on the atom's velocity. Phase shift $(\phi)$ of a spin is a function of the gradient field $\mathbf{G}(t)$:

$$\phi = \gamma \int_0^t B_0 + \mathbf{G}(\tau) \cdot \mathbf{r}(\tau) d\tau$$

where $\gamma$ is the Gyromagnetic ratio and $\mathbf{r}$ is defined as:

$$\mathbf{r} (\tau) = \mathbf r_0  + \mathbf v_r \tau + \frac{1}{2}  \mathbf a_r \tau^2 + \ldots$$,

$\mathbf r_0$ is the initial position of the spin, $\mathbf v_r$ is the spin velocity, and $\mathbf a_r$ is the spin acceleration.

If we only consider static spins and spins in the x-direction, we can rewrite equation for phase shift as:

$$\phi = \gamma x_0 \int_0^t G_x(\tau) d \tau + \gamma v_x \int_0^t G_x (\tau) \tau d \tau + \gamma \frac{a_x}{2} \int_0^t G_x ( \tau ) \tau^2 d \tau + \ldots$$

We then assume that acceleration and higher order terms are negligible to simplify the expression for phase to:

$$\phi = \gamma (x_0 M_0 + v_x M_1)$$

where $M_0$ is the zeroth moment of the x-gradient and $M_1$ is the first moment of the x gradient.

If we take two different acquisitions with applied magnetic gradients that are the opposite of each other (bipolar gradients), we can add the results of the two acquisitions together to calculate a change in phase that is dependent on gradient:

$$\Delta \phi = v (\gamma \Delta M_1)$$

where $\Delta M_1 = 2 M_1$.

The phase shift is measured and converted to a velocity according to the following equation:

$$v = \frac{v_{enc}}{\pi} \Delta \phi$$

where $v_{enc}$ is the maximum velocity that can be recorded and $\Delta \phi$ is the recorded phase shift.

The choice of $v_{enc}$ defines range of velocities visible, known as the 'dynamic range'. A choice of $v_{enc}$ below the maximum velocity in the slice will induce aliasing in the image where a velocity just greater than $v_{enc}$ will be incorrectly calculated as moving in the opposite direction. However, there is a direct trade-off between the maximum velocity that can be encoded and the signal-to-noise ratio of the velocity measurements. This can be described by:

$$SNR_v = \frac{\pi}{\sqrt{2}} \frac{v}{v_{enc}} SNR$$

where $SNR$ is the signal-to-noise ratio of the image (which depends on the magnetic field of the scanner, the voxel volume, and the acquisition time of the scan).

For an example, setting a 'low' $v_{enc}$ (below the maximum velocity expected in the scan) will allow for better visualization of slower velocities (better SNR), but any higher velocities will alias to an incorrect value. Setting a 'high' $v_{enc}$ (above the maximum velocity expected in the scan) will allow for the proper velocity quantification, but the larger dynamic range will obscure the smaller velocity features as well as decrease SNR. Therefore, the setting of $v_{enc}$ will be application dependent and care must be exercised in the selection. In order to further allow for proper velocity quantification, especially in clinical applications where the velocity dynamic range of flow is high (e.g. blood flow velocities in vessels across the thoracoabdominal cavity), a dual-echo PC-MRI (DEPC) method with dual velocity encoding in the same repetition time has been developed. The DEPC method does not only allow for proper velocity quantification, but also reduces the total acquisition time (especially when applied to 4D flow imaging) compared to a single-echo single-$v_{enc}$ PC-MRI acquisition carried out at two separate $v_{enc}$ values.

To allow for more flexibility in selecting $v_{enc}$, instantaneous phase (phase unwrapping) can be used to increase both dynamic range and SNR.

=== Encoding Methods ===
When each dimension of velocity is calculated based on acquisitions from oppositely applied gradients, this is known as a six-point method. However, more efficient methods are also used. Two are described here:

==== Simple Four-point Method ====
Four sets of encoding gradients are used. The first is a reference and applies a negative moment in $x$,$y$, and $z$. The next applies a positive moment in $x$, and a negative moment in $y$ and $z$. The third applies a positive moment in $y$, and a negative moment in $x$ and $z$. And the last applies a positive moment in $z$, and a negative moment in $x$ and $y$. Then, the velocities can be solved based on the phase information from the corresponding phase encodes as follows:

$$\hat{v}_x = \frac{ \phi_x - \phi_0}{\gamma \Delta M_1}$$
$$\hat{v}_y = \frac{ \phi_y - \phi_0}{\gamma \Delta M_1}$$
$$\hat{v}_z = \frac{ \phi_z - \phi_0}{\gamma \Delta M_1}$$

==== Balanced Four-Point Method ====
The balanced four-point method also includes four sets of encoding gradients. The first is the same as in the simple four-point method with negative gradients applied in all directions. The second has a negative moment in $x$, and a positive moment in $y$ and $z$. The third has a negative moment in $y$, and a positive moment in $x$ and $z$. The last has a negative moment in $z$ and a positive moment in $x$ and $y$. This gives us the following system of equations:

$$\phi_2 - \phi_1 = \phi_x + \phi_y$$
$$\phi_3 - \phi_1 = \phi_x + \phi_z$$
$$\phi_4 - \phi_1 = \phi_y + \phi_z$$

Then, the velocities can be calculated:

$$\hat{v}_x = \frac{ - \phi_1 + \phi_2 + \phi_3 - \phi_4}{2 \gamma \Delta M_1}$$
$$\hat{v}_y = \frac{ - \phi_1 + \phi_2 - \phi_3 + \phi_4}{2 \gamma \Delta M_1}$$
$$\hat{v}_z = \frac{ - \phi_1 - \phi_2 + \phi_3 + \phi_4}{2 \gamma \Delta M_1}$$

=== Retrospective Cardiac and Respiratory Gating ===
For medical imaging, in order to get highly resolved scans in 3D space and time without motion artifacts from the heart or lungs, retrospective cardiac gating and respiratory compensation are employed. Beginning with cardiac gating, the patient's ECG signal is recorded throughout the imaging process. Similarly, the patient's respiratory patterns can be tracked throughout the scan. After the scan, the continuously collected data in k-space (temporary image space) can be assigned accordingly to match-up with the timing of the heart beat and lung motion of the patient. This means that these scans are cardiac-averaged so the measured blood velocities are an average over multiple cardiac cycles.

== Applications ==
Phase contrast MRI is one of the main techniques for magnetic resonance angiography (MRA). This is used to generate images of arteries (and less commonly veins) in order to evaluate them for stenosis (abnormal narrowing), occlusions, aneurysms (vessel wall dilatations, at risk of rupture) or other abnormalities. MRA is often used to evaluate the arteries of the neck and brain, the thoracic and abdominal aorta, the renal arteries, and the legs (the latter exam is often referred to as a "run-off").

== Limitations ==
In particular, a few limitations of PC-MRI are of importance for the measured velocities:

- Partial volume effects (when a voxel contains the boundary between static and moving materials) can overestimate phase leading to inaccurate velocities at the interface between materials or tissues.
- Intravoxel phase dispersion (when velocities within a pixel are heterogeneous or in areas of turbulent flow) can produce a resultant phase that does not resolve the flow features accurately.
- Assuming that acceleration and higher orders of motion are negligible can be inaccurate depending on the flow field.
- Displacement artifacts (also known as misregistration and oblique flow artifacts) occur when there is a time difference between the phase and frequency encoding. These artifacts are highest when the flow direction is within the slice plane (most prominent in the heart and aorta for biological flows)

== Vastly undersampled Isotropic Projection Reconstruction (VIPR) ==
A Vastly undersampled Isotropic Projection Reconstruction (VIPR) is a radially acquired MRI sequence which results in high-resolution MRA with significantly reduced scan times, and without the need for breath-holding.
