= Gadodiamide =

Chemical compound

Clinical data
- Trade names: Omniscan
- Other names: 2-[bis[2-(carboxylatomethyl-(methylcarbamoylmethyl)amino)ethyl]amino]acetate; gadolinium(+3) cation
- AHFS/Drugs.com: Micromedex Detailed Consumer Information
- License data: US DailyMed: Gadodiamide
- Routes of administration: Intravenous
- ATC code: V08CA03 (WHO)

Legal status
- Legal status: CA: ℞-only; US: ℞-only; EU: Rx-only

Pharmacokinetic data
- Protein binding: negligible
- Metabolism: not metabolized
- Elimination half-life: 77.8 minutes
- Excretion: Kidney

Identifiers
- IUPAC name: gadolinium(III) 5,8-bis(carboxylatomethyl)-2-[2-(methylamino)-2-oxoethyl]-10-oxo-2,5,8,11-tetraazadodecane-1-carboxylate hydrate
- CAS Number: 131410-48-5 122795-43-1 (hydrate)
- PubChem CID: 153921
- DrugBank: DB00225
- ChemSpider: 135661
- UNII: 84F6U3J2R6
- KEGG: D01645
- ChEBI: CHEBI:37333
- ChEMBL: ChEMBL1200346
- CompTox Dashboard (EPA): DTXSID9048647

Chemical and physical data
- Formula: C_{16}H_{28}GdN_{5}O_{9}
- Molar mass: 591.68 g·mol^{−1}
- 3D model (JSmol): Interactive image
- SMILES: [Gd+3].[O-]C(=O)CN(CC(=O)NC)CCN(CCN(CC([O-])=O)CC(=O)NC)CC([O-])=O
- InChI: InChI=1S/C16H29N5O8.Gd/c1-17-12(22)7-20(10-15(26)27)5-3-19(9-14(24)25)4-6-21(11-16(28)29)8-13(23)18-2;/h3-11H2,1-2H3,(H,17,22)(H,18,23)(H,24,25)(H,26,27)(H,28,29);/q;+3/p-3; Key:HZHFFEYYPYZMNU-UHFFFAOYSA-K

Gadodiamide, sold under the brand name Omniscan, is a gadolinium-based MRI contrast agent (GBCA), used in magnetic resonance imaging (MRI) procedures to assist in the visualization of blood vessels.

== Medical uses ==
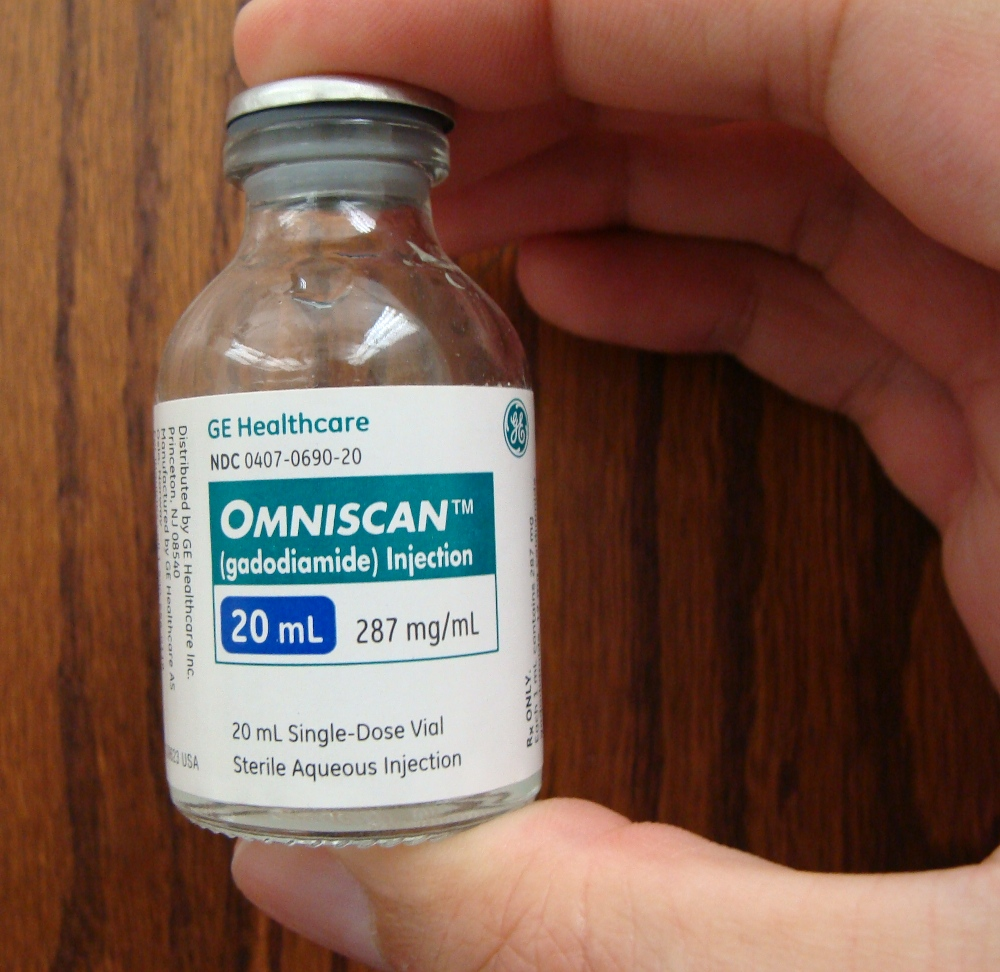
A bottle of Omniscan contrast agent.

Gadodiamide is a contrast medium used for cranial and spinal magnetic resonance imaging (MRI) and for general MRI of the body after intravenous administration. It provides contrast enhancement and facilitates visualisation of abnormal structures or lesions in various parts of the body including the central nervous system (CNS). It crosses intact the blood brain barrier.

== Adverse effects ==
Gadodiamide is one of the main GBCA associated with nephrogenic systemic fibrosis (NSF), a toxic reaction occurring in some people with kidney problems. No cases have been seen in people with normal kidney function.

A 2015 study found gadolinium deposited in the brain tissue of people who had received gadodiamide. Other studies using post-mortem mass spectrometry found most of the deposit remained at least 2 years after an injection and deposit also in individuals with no kidney issues.

In vitro studies found it to be neurotoxic.

An Italian task force recommended that breastfeeding mothers precautionally avoid any contrast agent, such as gadodiamide, that has been associated with nephrogenic systemic fibrosis.

Like other gadolinium-based contrast agents (GBCAs), gadodiamide may cause a range of adverse reactions. The most common include mild symptoms such as nausea, headache, or injection site discomfort. However, rare but serious reactions have been reported.

=== Hypersensitivity and anaphylaxis ===
Gadodiamide can cause severe allergic or hypersensitivity reactions, including anaphylaxis—a potentially life-threatening condition requiring immediate medical attention and treatment with epinephrine (adrenaline). Post-marketing surveillance and case studies have documented such events in patients who received gadodiamide.

Data from the U.S. FDA Adverse Event Reporting System (FAERS) also list anaphylaxis and other hypersensitivity reactions among the reported adverse effects associated with gadodiamide.

Patients with a known history of allergic reactions to contrast media or other drugs should inform their healthcare provider before undergoing imaging studies with gadodiamide. In high-risk individuals, premedication and pre-screening protocols may be considered to mitigate the risk of severe reactions.

== Usage ==
Gadodiamide was suspended along with gadopentetic acid (Magnevist) by the European Medicines Agency in 2017.
