= Gataparsen =

Clinical data
- Other names: LY2181308

Legal status
- Legal status: Investigational

Identifiers
- IUPAC name: all-P-ambo-2'-O-(2-methoxyethyl)-5-methyl-P-thiouridylyl-(3'→5')-2'-O-(2-methoxyethyl)-P-thioguanylyl-(3'→5')-2'-O-(2-methoxyethyl)-5-methyl-P-thiouridylyl-(3'→5')-2'-O-(2-methoxyethyl)-P-thioguanylyl-(3'→5')-2'-deoxy-5-methyl-P-thiocytidylyl-(3'→5')-P-thiothymidylyl-(3'→5')-2'-deoxy-P-thioadenylyl-(3'→5')-P-thiothymidylyl-(3'→5')-P- thiothymidylyl-(3'→5')-2'-deoxy-5-methyl-P-thiocytidylyl-(3'→5')-P-thiothymidylyl-(3'→5')-2'-deoxy-P-thioguanylyl-(3'→5')-P-thiothymidylyl-(3'→5')-2'-deoxy-P-thioguanylyl-(3'→5')-2'-O-(2-methoxyethyl)-P-thioadenylyl-(3'→5')-2'-O-(2-methoxyethyl)-P-thioadenylyl-(3'→5')-2'-O-(2-methoxyethyl)-5-methyl-P-thiouridylyl-(3'→5')-2'-O-(2-methoxyethyl)-5-methyluridine
- CAS Number: 1065019-70-6
- ChemSpider: 34981131
- UNII: 895O8QKF18

Chemical and physical data
- Formula: C_{204}H_{278}N_{59}O_{111}P_{17}S_{17}
- Molar mass: 6404.34 g·mol^{−1}
- SMILES: COCCO[C@H]1[C@@H](O[C@@H]([C@H]1OP(=S)(O)OC[C@@H]1[C@H]([C@H]([C@@H](O1)N1C=NC=2C(=O)NC(N)=NC12)OCCOC)OP(=S)(O)OC[C@@H]1[C@H]([C@H]([C@@H](O1)N1C(=O)NC(=O)C(=C1)C)OCCOC)OP(=S)(O)OC[C@@H]1[C@H]([C@H]([C@@H](O1)N1C=NC=2C(=O)NC(N)=NC12)OCCOC)OP(=S)(O)OC[C@@H]1[C@H](C[C@@H](O1)N1C(=O)N=C(N)C(=C1)C)OP(=S)(O)OC[C@@H]1[C@H](C[C@@H](O1)N1C(=O)NC(=O)C(C)=C1)OP(=S)(O)OC[C@@H]1[C@H](C[C@@H](O1)N1C=NC=2C(N)=NC=NC12)OP(=S)(O)OC[C@@H]1[C@H](C[C@@H](O1)N1C(=O)NC(=O)C(C)=C1)OP(=S)(O)OC[C@@H]1[C@H](C[C@@H](O1)N1C(=O)NC(=O)C(C)=C1)OP(=S)(O)OC[C@@H]1[C@H](C[C@@H](O1)N1C(=O)N=C(N)C(=C1)C)OP(=S)(O)OC[C@@H]1[C@H](C[C@@H](O1)N1C(=O)NC(=O)C(C)=C1)OP(=S)(O)OC[C@@H]1[C@H](C[C@@H](O1)N1C=NC=2C(=O)NC(N)=NC12)OP(=S)(O)OC[C@@H]1[C@H](C[C@@H](O1)N1C(=O)NC(=O)C(C)=C1)OP(=S)(O)OC[C@@H]1[C@H](C[C@@H](O1)N1C=NC=2C(=O)NC(N)=NC12)OP(=S)(O)OC[C@@H]1[C@H]([C@H]([C@@H](O1)N1C=NC=2C(N)=NC=NC12)OCCOC)OP(=S)(O)OC[C@@H]1[C@H]([C@H]([C@@H](O1)N1C=NC=2C(N)=NC=NC12)OCCOC)OP(=S)(O)OC[C@@H]1[C@H]([C@H]([C@@H](O1)N1C(=O)NC(=O)C(=C1)C)OCCOC)OP(=S)(O)OC[C@@H]1[C@H]([C@H]([C@@H](O1)N1C(=O)NC(=O)C(=C1)C)OCCOC)O)CO)N1C(=O)NC(=O)C(=C1)C
- InChI: InChI=1S/C204H278N59O111P17S17/c1-85-46-246(194(279)227-157(85)205)124-36-96(358-375(290,392)324-59-109-101(41-129(343-109)251-51-90(6)172(269)240-199(251)284)363-380(295,397)330-65-115-104(44-132(348-115)258-79-223-137-165(258)229-190(210)233-178(137)275)366-383(298,400)328-63-112-102(42-130(346-112)252-52-91(7)173(270)241-200(252)285)364-381(296,398)331-66-116-105(45-133(349-116)259-80-224-138-166(259)230-191(211)234-179(138)276)367-384(299,401)334-69-120-145(153(319-32-24-311-16)186(354-120)260-81-221-135-160(208)215-76-218-163(135)260)372-391(306,408)338-72-121-146(154(320-33-25-312-17)187(355-121)261-82-222-136-161(209)216-77-219-164(136)261)373-389(304,406)336-70-118-143(151(317-30-22-309-14)184(352-118)255-55-94(10)176(273)244-203(255)288)369-386(301,403)333-68-117-141(265)149(315-28-20-307-12)182(351-117)253-53-92(8)174(271)242-201(253)286)107(340-124)58-323-377(292,394)360-98-38-126(248-48-87(3)169(266)237-196(248)281)342-108(98)61-326-378(293,395)361-99-39-127(249-49-88(4)170(267)238-197(249)282)345-111(99)62-327-382(297,399)365-103-43-131(257-78-220-134-159(207)214-75-217-162(134)257)347-114(103)64-329-379(294,396)362-100-40-128(250-50-89(5)171(268)239-198(250)283)344-110(100)60-325-376(291,393)359-97-37-125(247-47-86(2)158(206)228-195(247)280)341-113(97)67-332-385(300,402)371-147-123(357-188(155(147)321-34-26-313-18)262-83-225-139-167(262)231-192(212)235-180(139)277)74-339-388(303,405)370-144-119(353-185(152(144)318-31-23-310-15)256-56-95(11)177(274)245-204(256)289)71-337-390(305,407)374-148-122(356-189(156(148)322-35-27-314-19)263-84-226-140-168(263)232-193(213)236-181(140)278)73-335-387(302,404)368-142-106(57-264)350-183(150(142)316-29-21-308-13)254-54-93(9)175(272)243-202(254)287/h46-56,75-84,96-133,141-156,182-189,264-265H,20-45,57-74H2,1-19H3,(H,290,392)(H,291,393)(H,292,394)(H,293,395)(H,294,396)(H,295,397)(H,296,398)(H,297,399)(H,298,400)(H,299,401)(H,300,402)(H,301,403)(H,302,404)(H,303,405)(H,304,406)(H,305,407)(H,306,408)(H2,205,227,279)(H2,206,228,280)(H2,207,214,217)(H2,208,215,218)(H2,209,216,219)(H,237,266,281)(H,238,267,282)(H,239,268,283)(H,240,269,284)(H,241,270,285)(H,242,271,286)(H,243,272,287)(H,244,273,288)(H,245,274,289)(H3,210,229,233,275)(H3,211,230,234,276)(H3,212,231,235,277)(H3,213,232,236,278)/t96-,97-,98-,99-,100-,101-,102-,103-,104-,105-,106+,107+,108+,109+,110+,111+,112+,113+,114+,115+,116+,117+,118+,119+,120+,121+,122+,123+,124+,125+,126+,127+,128+,129+,130+,131+,132+,133+,141+,142+,143+,144+,145+,146+,147+,148+,149+,150+,151+,152+,153+,154+,155+,156+,182+,183+,184+,185+,186+,187+,188+,189+,375?,376?,377?,378?,379?,380?,381?,382?,383?,384?,385?,386?,387?,388?,389?,390?,391?/m0/s1; Key:SEMODNSMTKOTGN-FWRIRCPLSA-N

Gataparsen (development code LY2181308) is an antisense oligonucleotide that complementarily binds to survivin mRNA and inhibits its expression in tumor tissue.

Gataparsen is being investigated for a number of different cancers.

It is targeted at survivin which prevents cells dying.

== Clinical trials ==
It has completed a phase II trial for acute myeloid leukemia.

A phase II trial for non-small cell lung cancer has started.

A phase II trial for hormone-refractory prostate cancer will run until early 2012.
