= Magnetic resonance velocimetry =

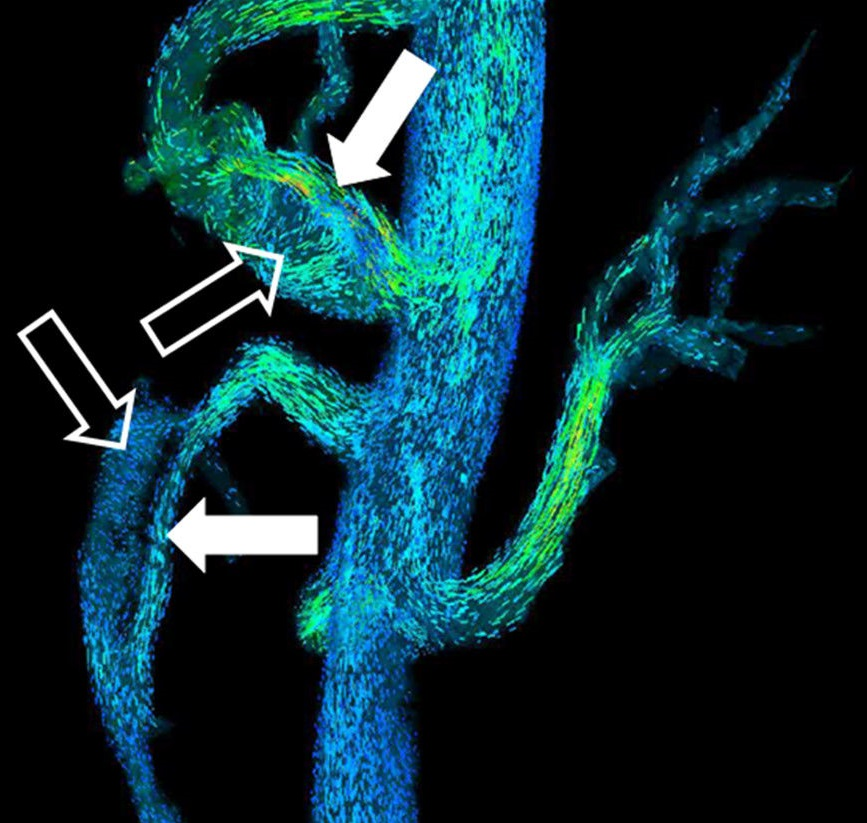
Vastly undersampled Isotropic Projection Reconstruction (VIPR) of a Phase Contrast (PC) MRI sequence of a 56-year-old male with dissections of the celiac artery (upper) and the superior mesenteric artery (lower). Laminar flow is present in the true lumen (closed arrow) and helical flow is present in the false lumen (open arrow).

Magnetic resonance velocimetry (MRV) is an experimental method to obtain velocity fields in fluid mechanics. MRV is based on the phenomenon of nuclear magnetic resonance and adapts a medical magnetic resonance imaging system for the analysis of technical flows. The velocities are usually obtained by phase contrast magnetic resonance imaging techniques. This means velocities are calculated from phase differences in the image data that has been produced using special gradient techniques. MRV can be applied using common medical MRI scanners. The term magnetic resonance velocimetry became current due to the increasing use of MR technology for the measurement of technical flows in engineering.

== Applications ==
In engineering MRV can be applied to the following areas:

- Analysis of technical flows in complex geometries (separation, recirculation zones)
- Validation of numerical simulations in computational fluid dynamics using 3D velocity fields
- Iterative design of complex inner flow channels (combined with rapid prototyping)
- Measurement of concentration distributions in mixing processes
- Analysis of flow through porous media
- Interaction of immiscible fluids

== Advantages and limitations ==
In contrast to other non-invasive velocimetry methods such as PIV or LDA, no optical access is required. Besides, no particles have to be added to the fluid. Thus, MRV enables to analyze the complete flow field in complex geometries and components. Based on the fact that common MR scanners are designed to detect the nuclear magnetic resonance of hydrogen protons, the tested applications are limited to water flows. Common fluid mechanical scaling concepts compensate this limitation. To achieve the spatial resolution, single data acquisition steps have to be repeated a great number of times with slight variations. Thus, MRV technology is limited to steady or periodical flows.

== See also ==
- Flow measurement
- Particle image velocimetry
- Laser Doppler anemometry
