= Germanium (68Ge) chloride/gallium (68Ga) chloride =

Combination medication

Germanium (^{68}Ge) chloride/gallium (^{68}Ga) chloride
Combination of
- Germanium (68Ge) chloride: Radionuclide
- Gallium (68Ga) chloride: Radionuclide

Clinical data
- Trade names: Galenvita
- ATC code: None

Legal status
- Legal status: EU: Rx-only

Germanium (68Ge) chloride/gallium (68Ga) chloride is a radionuclide generator. It is a combination of germanium (^{68}Ge) chloride and gallium (^{68}Ga) chloride.

== Medical uses ==
The combination is indicated for in vitro radiolabeling of various kits for radiopharmaceutical preparation developed and approved for radiolabeling with such eluate, to be used for positron emission tomography (PET) imaging.

== Society and culture ==
=== Legal status ===
In November 2025, the Committee for Medicinal Products for Human Use of the European Medicines Agency recommended granting a marketing authorization for GalenVita (germanium (68Ge) chloride / gallium (68Ga) chloride), a radionuclide generator. GalenVita is used to produce gallium (68Ga) chloride solution, that is used to label carrier molecules used for positron emission tomography (PET) diagnostic imaging of different types of tumors. The combination was authorized for medical use in the European Union in January 2026.

=== Names ===
The combination is sold under the brand name GalenVita.
