= Gefurulimab =

Medication

Monoclonal antibody
- Type: Whole antibody
- Source: Humanized
- Target: C5 complement protein

Clinical data
- Trade names: Klygefa
- Other names: ALXN1720, ALXN-1720, gefurulimab-gaks
- AHFS/Drugs.com: Klygefa
- License data: US DailyMed: Gefurulimab
- ATC code: None

Legal status
- Legal status: US: ℞-only; EU: Rx-only; JP: Rx-only

Identifiers
- CAS Number: 2456407-94-4
- UNII: 6PWU78BV6C
- KEGG: D12208

Chemical and physical data
- Formula: C_{1230}H_{1878}N_{356}O_{391}S_{8}
- Molar mass: 28165.14 g·mol^{−1}

Gefurulimab, sold under the brand name Klygefa, is a medication used for the treatment of myasthenia gravis. Gefurulimab is a complement inhibitor. It is a bispecific nanobody, targeting complement component 5 (C5) and serum albumin. It acts as an immunosuppressant.

Gefurulimab was approved for medical use in Japan in September 2026, and in the United States in November 2026.

== Medical uses ==
Gefurulimab is indicated as add-on to standard therapy for the treatment of generalized myasthenia gravis in adults who are anti-acetylcholine receptor antibody positive.

== Society and culture ==
=== Legal status ===
In September 2026, the Committee for Medicinal Products for Human Use of the European Medicines Agency adopted a positive opinion, recommending the granting of a marketing authorization for the medicinal product Klygefa, intended for the treatment of adults with generalised myasthenia gravis who are anti-acetylcholine receptor (AChR) antibody positive. The applicant for this medicinal product is Alexion Europe. Gefurulimab was authorized for medical use in the European Union in November 20226.

Gefurulimab was approved by the US Food and Drug Administration (FDA) for medical use in the United States in November 2026.

=== Names ===
Gefurulimab is the international nonproprietary name.

Gefurulimab is sold under the brand name Klygefa.
