= Gadopiclenol =

MRI contrast agent

Clinical data
- Trade names: Elucirem, others
- AHFS/Drugs.com: Micromedex Detailed Consumer Information
- License data: US DailyMed: Gadopiclenol
- Routes of administration: Intravenous
- ATC code: V08CA12 (WHO)

Legal status
- Legal status: CA: ℞-only; US: ℞-only; EU: Rx-only

Pharmacokinetic data
- Metabolism: None
- Excretion: Kidneys

Identifiers
- IUPAC name: 2-[3,9-bis[1-carboxylato-4-(2,3-dihydroxypropylamino)-4-oxobutyl]-3,6,9,15-tetrazabicyclo[9.3.1]pentadeca-1(15),11,13-trien-6-yl]-5-(2,3-dihydroxypropylamino)-5-oxopentanoate;gadolinium(3+)
- CAS Number: 933983-75-6
- PubChem CID: 16223405
- ChemSpider: 17350646
- UNII: S276568KOY
- KEGG: D12435

Chemical and physical data
- Formula: C_{35}H_{54}GdN_{7}O_{15}
- Molar mass: 970.10 g·mol^{−1}
- 3D model (JSmol): Interactive image
- SMILES: [Gd+3].OCC(O)CNC(=O)CCC(N1CCN(Cc2cccc(CN(CC1)C(CCC(=O)NCC(O)CO)C(=O)[O-])n2)C(CCC(=O)NCC(O)CO)C(=O)[O-])C(=O)[O-]
- InChI: InChI=1S/C35H57N7O15.Gd/c43-19-24(46)14-36-30(49)7-4-27(33(52)53)40-10-12-41(28(34(54)55)5-8-31(50)37-15-25(47)20-44)17-22-2-1-3-23(39-22)18-42(13-11-40)29(35(56)57)6-9-32(51)38-16-26(48)21-45;/h1-3,24-29,43-48H,4-21H2,(H,36,49)(H,37,50)(H,38,51)(H,52,53)(H,54,55)(H,56,57);/q;+3/p-3; Key:GNRQMLROZPOLDG-UHFFFAOYSA-K

Gadopiclenol, sold under the brand name Elucirem among others, is a contrast agent used with magnetic resonance imaging (MRI) to detect and visualize lesions with abnormal vascularity in the central nervous system and in the body. Gadopiclenol is a paramagnetic macrocyclic non-ionic complex of gadolinium.

Gadopiclenol was approved for medical use in the United States in September 2022, and in the European Union in December 2023.

== Medical uses ==
Gadopiclenol is indicated for use with magnetic resonance imaging to detect and visualize lesions with abnormal vascularity in the central nervous system (brain, spine, and associated tissues); or the body (head and neck, thorax, abdomen, pelvis, and musculoskeletal system).

== Pharmacology ==
Gadopiclenol has a higher relaxivity compared with standard gadolinium-based contrast agents (GBCAs). The higher relaxivity allows for a lower dose of gadopiclenol, reducing the total amount of gadolinium administered to the patient while preserving imaging quality. Gadopiclenol was approved by the FDA with a recommended dose of 0.05 mmol/kg for adults and pediatric patients aged 2 years and older. This is half the dose of standard macrocyclic GBCAs, which have a recommended dose of 0.1 mmol/kg.

== History ==
Gadopiclenol was develped by Guerbet and Bracco Imaging.

== Society and culture ==
=== Legal status ===
Gadopiclenol was approved for medical use in the United States in September 2022.

In October 2023, the Committee for Medicinal Products for Human Use (CHMP) of the European Medicines Agency adopted a positive opinion, recommending the granting of a marketing authorization for the medicinal product Elucirem, intended for contrast-enhanced magnetic resonance imaging (MRI) to improve detection and, visualization of pathologies when diagnostic information is essential and not available with unenhanced MRI. The applicant for this medicinal product is Guerbet. In October and December 2023, the CHMP adopted a positive opinion, recommending the granting of a marketing authorization for the medicinal products Elucirem and Vueway, intended for contrast-enhanced magnetic resonance imaging (MRI) to improve detection and, visualization of pathologies when diagnostic information is essential and not available with unenhanced MRI. Gadopiclenol was approved for medical use in the European Union in December 2023.

=== Brand names ===
Gadopiclenol is the international nonproprietary name.

Gadopiclenol is sold under the brand names Vueway and Elucirem.
