= Gavilimomab =

Monoclonal antibody

Monoclonal antibody
- Type: Whole antibody
- Source: Mouse
- Target: CD147

Clinical data
- ATC code: none

Identifiers
- CAS Number: 244096-20-6
- ChemSpider: none
- UNII: TCR92293RC

Gavilimomab (also known as ABX-CBL) is a mouse monoclonal antibody intended for use as an immunosuppressive biologic treatment of glucocorticoid-resistant graft versus host disease. It binds to the antigen CD147. Gavilimomab proved slightly less effective than standard antithymocyte globulin therapy.

It was originally developed by Abgenix, which was later acquired by Amgen.
