= Girolline =

Names
- IUPAC name (1S,2S)-3-Amino-1-(2-amino-1H-imidazol-5-yl)-2-chloropropan-1-ol
- Other names Giracodazole

Identifiers
CAS Number	110883-46-0
3D model (JSmol)	Interactive image
ChEMBL	ChEMBL1171272
ChemSpider	59320
PubChem CID	65911
UNII	RU19QYB9WZ
CompTox Dashboard (EPA)	DTXSID80891413
- InChI: InChI=1S/C6H11ClN4O/c7-3(1-8)5(12)4-2-10-6(9)11-4/h2-3,5,12H,1,8H2,(H3,9,10,11)/t3-,5+/m0/s1 Key: YILCGOCHVFQMTC-WVZVXSGGSA-N
- SMILES: [C@H]([C@H](CN)Cl)(O)C=1NC(N)=NC1

Properties
Chemical formula	C_{6}H_{11}ClN_{4}O
Molar mass	190.63 g·mol^{−1}
- Except where otherwise noted, data are given for materials in their standard state (at 25 °C [77 °F], 100 kPa). Infobox references

Girolline (also known as giracodazole) is a chemical compound isolated from a marine sponge. It inhibits protein synthesis.
