= Gadobenic acid =

Complex of gadolinium by a chelating agent derived from DTPA

Clinical data
- Trade names: MultiHance
- Other names: gadobenate dimeglumine (USAN US)
- AHFS/Drugs.com: Professional Drug Facts
- ATC code: V08CA08 (WHO)

Legal status
- Legal status: CA: ℞-only; UK: POM (Prescription only); US: ℞-only

Identifiers
- IUPAC name: dihydrogen [(±)-4-carboxy-5,8,11-tris(carboxymethyl)-1-phenyl-2-oxa-5,8,11-triazatridecan-13-oato(5−)]gadolinate(2−).
- CAS Number: 113662-23-0
- PubChem CID: 105124
- DrugBank: DB00743
- ChemSpider: 94843
- UNII: 15G12L5X8K
- KEGG: D08018
- ChEMBL: ChEMBL1200571
- CompTox Dashboard (EPA): DTXSID00921145

Chemical and physical data
- Formula: C_{22}H_{28}GdN_{3}O_{11}
- Molar mass: 667.73 g·mol^{−1}
- 3D model (JSmol): Interactive image
- SMILES: [H+].[H+].[Gd+3].[O-]C(=O)CN(CC([O-])=O)CCN(CC([O-])=O)CCN(CC([O-])=O)C(C([O-])=O)COCc1ccccc1
- InChI: InChI=1S/C22H31N3O11.Gd/c26-18(27)10-23(6-7-24(11-19(28)29)12-20(30)31)8-9-25(13-21(32)33)17(22(34)35)15-36-14-16-4-2-1-3-5-16;/h1-5,17H,6-15H2,(H,26,27)(H,28,29)(H,30,31)(H,32,33)(H,34,35);/q;+3/p-3; Key:MXZROTBGJUUXID-UHFFFAOYSA-K

Gadobenic acid (INN, brand name MultiHance) is a complex of gadolinium with the ligand BOPTA. In the form of the methylglucamine salt meglumine gadobenate (INNm) or gadobenate dimeglumine (USAN), it is used as a gadolinium-based MRI contrast medium.

BOPTA is a derivative of DTPA in which one terminal carboxyl group, –C(O)OH is replaced by -C–O–CH_{2}C_{6}H_{5}. Thus gadobenic acid is closely related to gadopentetic acid. BOPTA itself was first synthesized in 1995. In the "gadobenate" ion gadolinium ion is 9-coordinate with BOPTA acting as an 8-coordinating ligand. The ninth position is occupied by a water molecule, which exchanges rapidly with water molecules in the immediate vicinity of the strongly paramagnetic complex, providing a mechanism for MRI contrast enhancement. ^{139}La nuclear magnetic resonance (NMR) studies on the diamagnetic La-BOPTA^{2−} complex suggest that the Gd complex maintains in solution the same kind of coordination as found, by X-ray crystallography, in the solid state for Gd-BOPTA disodium salt.
