= Glucuronamide =

Identifiers
CAS Number	61914-43-0
3D model (JSmol)	Interactive image
ChemSpider	85086
EC Number	223-260-9
PubChem CID	94281
UNII	1Q5MP1Z8HW
CompTox Dashboard (EPA)	DTXSID1046261
- InChI: InChI=1S/C6H11NO6/c7-6(13)5(12)4(11)3(10)2(9)1-8/h1-5,9-12H,(H2,7,13)/t2-,3+,4-,5-/m0/s1 Key: JRIOKBXQMHEJOZ-QTBDOELSSA-N; InChI=1/C6H11NO6/c7-6(13)5(12)4(11)3(10)2(9)1-8/h1-5,9-12H,(H2,7,13)/t2-,3+,4-,5-/m0/s1 Key: JRIOKBXQMHEJOZ-QTBDOELSBT
- SMILES: C(=O)[C@@H]([C@H]([C@@H]([C@@H](C(=O)N)O)O)O)O

Properties
Chemical formula	C_{6}H_{10}NO_{6}
Molar mass	192.147 g·mol^{−1}
- Except where otherwise noted, data are given for materials in their standard state (at 25 °C [77 °F], 100 kPa). verify (what is ?) Infobox references

Glucuronamide is a hexose related to glucuronic acid.
