= Gabexate =

Chemical compound

Clinical data
- AHFS/Drugs.com: International Drug Names
- ATC code: none

Identifiers
- IUPAC name: ethyl 4-[6-(diaminomethylideneamino)hexanoyloxy]benzoate
- CAS Number: 39492-01-8
- PubChem CID: 3447
- IUPHAR/BPS: 7863
- ChemSpider: 3329
- UNII: 4V7M9137X9
- KEGG: D08004
- ChEMBL: ChEMBL87563
- CompTox Dashboard (EPA): DTXSID9048566

Chemical and physical data
- Formula: C_{16}H_{23}N_{3}O_{4}
- Molar mass: 321.377 g·mol^{−1}
- 3D model (JSmol): Interactive image
- SMILES: O=C(Oc1ccc(cc1)C(=O)OCC)CCCCC/N=C(\N)N
- InChI: InChI=1S/C16H23N3O4/c1-2-22-15(21)12-7-9-13(10-8-12)23-14(20)6-4-3-5-11-19-16(17)18/h7-10H,2-6,11H2,1H3,(H4,17,18,19); Key:YKGYIDJEEQRWQH-UHFFFAOYSA-N

Gabexate is a serine protease inhibitor which is used therapeutically (as gabexate mesilate) in the treatment of pancreatitis, disseminated intravascular coagulation, and as a regional anticoagulant for haemodialysis.
