= Gadoquatrane =

Contrast agent

Clinical data
- Trade names: Ambelvist
- License data: US DailyMed: Gadoquatrane
- Routes of administration: Intravenous
- ATC code: None

Legal status
- Legal status: CA: ℞-only; US: ℞-only

Identifiers
- IUPAC name: rac-[{μ_{4}-2,2^{'},2^{''},2^{'''},2^{''''},2^{'''''}-[{(2R,16Ξ)-3,6,12,15-tetraoxo-1κO^{3}:2κO^{15}-9,9-bis[(2-{(2Ξ)-2-[4,7,10-tris(carboxy-3κ^{3}O^{4},O^{7},O^{10}:4κ^{3}O^{4'},O^{7'},O^{10'}-methyl)-1,4,7,10-tetraazacyclododecan-1-yl-3κ^{4}N^{1},N^{4},N^{7},N^{10}:4κ^{4}N^{1'},N^{4'},N^{7'},N^{10'}]-propanamido-3κO:4κO^{'}}acetamido)methyl]-4,7,11,14-tetraazaheptadecane-2,16-diyl}bis(1,4,7,10-tetraazacyclododecane-10,1,4,7-tetrayl-1κ^{4}N^{1},N^{4},N^{7},N^{10}:2κ^{4}N^{1'},N^{4'},N^{7'},N^{10'})]hexaacetato-1κ^{3}O^{1},O^{4},O^{7}:-2κ^{3}O^{1'},O^{4'},O^{7'}}(12−)]tetragadolinium
- CAS Number: 2048221-65-2
- ChemSpider: 129957893
- UNII: OZG7J613HK
- ChEMBL: ChEMBL6068450

Chemical and physical data
- Formula: C_{81}H_{128}Gd_{4}N_{24}O_{32}
- Molar mass: 2579.05 g·mol^{−1}
- 3D model (JSmol): Interactive image
- SMILES: CC(C(=O)NCC(=O)NCC(CNC(=O)CNC(=O)C(C)N1CCN(CCN(CCN(CC1)CC(=O)[O-])CC(=O)[O-])CC(=O)[O-])(CNC(=O)CNC(=O)C(C)N2CCN(CCN(CCN(CC2)CC(=O)[O-])CC(=O)[O-])CC(=O)[O-])CNC(=O)CNC(=O)C(C)N3CCN(CCN(CCN(CC3)CC(=O)[O-])CC(=O)[O-])CC(=O)[O-])N4CCN(CCN(CCN(CC4)CC(=O)[O-])CC(=O)[O-])CC(=O)[O-].[Gd+3].[Gd+3].[Gd+3].[Gd+3]
- InChI: InChI=InChI=1S/C81H140N24O32.4Gd/c1-57(102-29-21-94(45-69(118)119)13-5-90(41-65(110)111)6-14-95(22-30-102)46-70(120)121)77(134)82-37-61(106)86-53-81(54-87-62(107)38-83-78(135)58(2)103-31-23-96(47-71(122)123)15-7-91(42-66(112)113)8-16-97(24-32-103)48-72(124)125,55-88-63(108)39-84-79(136)59(3)104-33-25-98(49-73(126)127)17-9-92(43-67(114)115)10-18-99(26-34-104)50-74(128)129)56-89-64(109)40-85-80(137)60(4)105-35-27-100(51-75(130)131)19-11-93(44-68(116)117)12-20-101(28-36-105)52-76(132)133;;;;/h57-60H,5-56H2,1-4H3,(H,82,134)(H,83,135)(H,84,136)(H,85,137)(H,86,106)(H,87,107)(H,88,108)(H,89,109)(H,110,111)(H,112,113)(H,114,115)(H,116,117)(H,118,119)(H,120,121)(H,122,123)(H,124,125)(H,126,127)(H,128,129)(H,130,131)(H,132,133);;;;/q;4*+3/p-12; Key:HGIZCBUSWUYZEQ-UHFFFAOYSA-B

Gadoquatrane, sold under the brand name Ambelvist, is a macrocyclic gadolinium-based MRI contrast agent (mGBCA) that is used with contrast-enhanced magnetic resonance imaging (CE-MRI) to detect and visualize lesions with abnormal vascularity in certain parts of the body. Gadoquatrane is administered as an intravenous injection.

== Medical uses ==
Gadoquatrane is indicated in people for use with magnetic resonance imaging (MRI) to detect and visualize lesions with abnormal vascularity in the central nervous system (brain, spine, and associated tissues) and the body (head and neck, thorax, abdomen, pelvis, and musculoskeletal system).

== Society and culture ==
=== Legal status ===
Gadoquatrane was approved for medical use in the United States in June 2026.

=== Names ===
Gadoquatrane is the international nonproprietary name.

Gadoquatrane is sold under the brand name Ambelvist.
