= Superparamagnetic iron–platinum particles =

Superparamagnetic iron platinum particles (SIPPs) are nanoparticles that have been reported as magnetic resonance imaging contrast agents. These are, however, investigational agents which have not yet been tried in humans.
