= Ganitumab =

Monoclonal antibody

Monoclonal antibody
- Type: Whole antibody
- Source: Human
- Target: IGF-1R

Clinical data
- ATC code: none

Identifiers
- CAS Number: 905703-97-1
- ChemSpider: none
- UNII: CK1441RCZ8
- KEGG: D09908

Chemical and physical data
- Formula: C_{6472}H_{10028}N_{1728}O_{2020}S_{42}
- Molar mass: 145712.01 g·mol^{−1}

Ganitumab is a human monoclonal antibody against type 1 insulin-like growth factor receptor (IGF1R), designed for the treatment of cancers.

Ganitumab was developed by Amgen. A phase III clinical trial (for metastatic pancreatic cancer) was abandoned in August 2012.
