= Gadoxetic acid =

Complex of gadolinium by a chelating agent derived from DTPA

Clinical data
- Trade names: Eovist
- Other names: Gadoxetate disodium (USAN US)
- AHFS/Drugs.com: International Drug Names
- ATC code: V08CA10 (WHO)

Legal status
- Legal status: CA: ℞-only; US: ℞-only; EU: Rx-only

Identifiers
- IUPAC name: 2-[[(2S)-2-[bis(carboxylatomethyl)amino]-3-(4-ethoxyphenyl)propyl]-[2-[bis(carboxylatomethyl)amino]ethyl]amino]acetate;gadolinium(3+)
- CAS Number: 135326-11-3
- PubChem CID: 131704314
- DrugBank: DB08884
- ChemSpider: 189907
- UNII: 3QJA87N40S
- KEGG: D08008; D04288
- ChEMBL: ChEMBL1201768
- CompTox Dashboard (EPA): DTXSID90928961

Chemical and physical data
- Formula: C_{23}H_{30}GdN_{3}O_{11}
- Molar mass: 681.75 g·mol^{−1}
- 3D model (JSmol): Interactive image
- SMILES: CCOc1ccc(cc1)C[C@@H](CN(CCN(CC(=O)O)CC(=O)[O-])CC(=O)[O-])N(CC(=O)O)CC(=O)[O-].[Gd+3]
- InChI: InChI=1S/C23H33N3O11.Gd/c1-2-37-18-5-3-16(4-6-18)9-17(26(14-22(33)34)15-23(35)36)10-24(11-19(27)28)7-8-25(12-20(29)30)13-21(31)32;/h3-6,17H,2,7-15H2,1H3,(H,27,28)(H,29,30)(H,31,32)(H,33,34)(H,35,36);/q;+3/p-3/t17-;/m0./s1; Key:PCZHWPSNPWAQNF-LMOVPXPDSA-K

Gadoxetic acid is a gadolinium-based MRI contrast agent. Its salt, gadoxetate disodium, is marketed as Primovist in Europe and Eovist in the United States by Bayer HealthCare Pharmaceuticals.

== Medical uses ==
It is used to increase the T1 signal intensity while imaging the liver lesions such as benign cysts, hemangioma, and liver cancer. It is excreted into bile by active secretion.

== Pharmacokinetics ==
In those with end-stage renal failure, the clearance rate is only 17% with terminal half-life of 12 times longer than those with normal renal function.
