= Lantheus Holdings =

Radiopharmaceuticals company

Lantheus, headquartered in Billerica, Massachusetts, is a company in the radiopharmaceuticals business. It has strategic partnerships with Bayer, Novartis, Regeneron as well as GE Healthcare and Siemens Healthineers.

Lantheus Holding, which became a NASDAQ company in 2015, is the parent company of Lantheus Medical Imaging, Inc. (formerly BMS Medical Imaging), Progenics Pharmaceuticals (acquired 2020), Inc. and EXINI Diagnostics AB (est. 1999, acquired 2020). Lantheus has offices in Massachusetts, New Jersey, Canada and Sweden.

Brian Markison has served as the company's CEO since March 1, 2024, following the retirement of Mary Anne Heino, who had led Lantheus for the preceding decade.
