= Nephrogenic systemic fibrosis =

- Other names: NSF
- Specialty: Dermatology
- Causes: iatrogenic disease caused by exposure to gadolinium-based contrast agents
- Risk factors: impaired kidney function is the major risk factor

Nephrogenic systemic fibrosis is a rare syndrome that involves fibrosis of the skin, joints, eyes, and internal organs. NSF is caused by exposure to gadolinium in gadolinium-based MRI contrast agents (GBCAs) in patients with impaired kidney function. Epidemiological studies suggest that the incidence of NSF is unrelated to gender or ethnicity and it is not thought to have a genetic basis. After GBCAs were identified as a cause of the disorder in 2006, and screening and prevention measures put in place, it is now considered rare.

== Signs and symptoms ==
Clinical features of NSF develop within days to months and, in some cases, years following exposure to some GBCAs. The main symptoms are the thickening and hardening of the skin associated with brawny hyperpigmentation, typically presenting in a symmetric fashion. The skin gradually becomes fibrotic and adheres to the underlying fascia. The symptoms initiate distally in the limbs and progress proximally, sometimes involving the trunk. Joint contractures of the fingers, elbows and knees can develop secondary to skin involvement and can severely impair physical function. While skin involvement is on the foreground, the process may involve any organ, e.g., the eye, heart, diaphragm, pleura, pericardium, and kidneys, as well as the lungs and liver.

== Causes ==
NSF is an iatrogenic disease caused by exposure to gadolinium-based contrast agents used in magnetic resonance imaging.

== Risk factors ==
Impaired kidney function reduces the clearance of GBCAs and is the major risk factor for the development of NSF. The etiology or duration of renal failure seems not to be relevant, but NSF risk greatly depends on the residual kidney function. The majority of NSF cases have been identified in patients with stage 5 CKD, but NSF has also developed in patients with stage 4 and 3 CKD, and those with acute kidney injury, even if kidney function subsequently returned to normal following GBCA administration. Thus NSF should be considered as a differential diagnosis in any patient who has been exposed to a GBCA, regardless of the kidney function level.

Three GBCAs have been principally implicated in NSF: gadodiamide, gadopentetate dimeglumine, and gadoversetamide, though cases have been reported with majority of GBCAs on the market. High doses in individual GBCA administrations and high cumulative doses of GBCA over the lifetime of patients with renal dysfunction are associated with increased risk of NSF.

== Mechanism ==
De-chelation of Gd(III) is responsible for the toxicity associated with gadolinium complexes such as GBCAs, and the toxicity appears to be a consequence of Zn^{2+}, Cu^{2+}, and Ca^{2+} transmetallation in vivo. This hypothesis is supported by acute toxicity experiments, which demonstrate that despite a 50-fold range of LDse values for four Gd(III) complexes, all become lethally toxic when they release precisely the same quantity of Gd(III). It is also supported by subchronic rodent toxicity experiments, which demonstrate a set of gross and microscopic findings similar to those known to be caused by Zn^{2+} deficiency. Under the transmetallation hypothesis, we can expect that subtle changes in formulation can affect the intrinsic safety of gadolinium complexes, which is indeed observed.

== Diagnosis ==
There is no specific imaging finding for NSF, and the diagnosis is a clinicopathological one, based on presentation and histological findings.

=== Microscopic pathology ===
At the microscopic level, NSF shows a proliferation of dermal fibroblasts and dendritic cells, thickened collagen bundles, increased elastic fibers, and deposits of mucin. More recent case reports have described the presence of sclerotic bodies (also known as elastocollagenous balls) in skin biopsies from NSF patients. While not universally present, this finding is believed to be unique to patients exposed to gadolinium, although not necessarily limited to areas involved by NSF.

=== Differential diagnosis ===
The differential diagnoses for NSF include diffuse cutaneous or limited cutaneous systemic sclerosis, scleromyxedema, lipodermatosclerosis, scleroedema diabeticorum, graft versus host disease, eosinophilic fasciitis; eosinophilia-myalgia syndrome; porphyria cutanea tarda, and other disorders. The nearly universal absence of facial skin involvement in NSF, presence of yellow plaques on the sclera of the eyes, absence of Raynaud's phenomenon, and other differences in presentation can aid the proper diagnosis. History of exposure to GBCAs would favor NSF as the differential diagnosis.

== Prevention ==
The only known measure for prevention of NSF is the non-use or cautious use of GBCAs in patients with renal impairment, including preferential use of safer, macrocyclic GBCAs. Performing dialysis immediately after the MRI exam is recommended for patients already in dialysis treatment, but there is no evidence for introducing dialysis in non-dialytic patients for prevention of NSF. Screening for impaired kidney function is routinely conducted and has drastically reduced the incidence of NSF.

== Treatment ==
Multiple therapies for NSF have been attempted, with variable clinical improvement. None have been as effective as restoration of kidney function. Restoration of kidney function by treating the underlying disease process, recovery from acute kidney injury (AKI), or performing a kidney transplant can slow or hold the progression of NSF. A few cases of curative kidney transplantation have been reported, and it is appropriate to consider transplantation as treatment.

== Epidemiology ==
NSF affects males and females in approximately equal numbers and has been reported in patients of different ethnic and geographic regions. It most often affects middle-aged individuals, but there are reports of cases occurring from childhood to senescence.

== History ==
This condition was originally termed "nephrogenic fibrosing dermopathy" as initially only skin involvement in patients with impaired kidney function was observed, and later renamed "nephrogenic systemic fibrosis" to better describe its systemic nature. The term "gadolinium-associated systemic fibrosis" has also been proposed to reflect the fact that impaired kidney function is not in itself the cause of NSF.

The first cases of NSF were identified in 1997, but it was first described as an independent disease entity in 2000. In 2006, the link between NSF and gadolinium-based MRI contrast agents was made. As a result, restrictions on use of GBCAs in patients with an estimated glomerular filtration rate (a measure of kidney function) under 60 and especially under 30 mL/min/1.73 m^{2} have been recommended and NSF is now considered rare.

After several years of controversy, during which up to 100 Danish patients developed gadolinium poisoning after use of the contrast agent Omniscan, the Norwegian medical company Nycomed admitted that they were aware of some dangers from using gadolinium-based agents in their product.

With both Gadopentetic acid (gadopentetate dimegulumine (Magnevist)) and Gadodiamide (Omniscan) the risk was considered to outweigh the benefits and, as a result, the EMA recommended the licence for intravenous gadopentetic acid and Gadodiamide be suspended.

Following a legally binding decision issued by The European Commission and applicable in all EU Member States (Commission decision date: 23/11/2017), Intravenous Magnevist and Omniscan is now no longer authorised for use in Europe. Magnavist is, however, still authorised in Europe as an intra-articular MR contrast medium. The authorised indication for the use of linear chelated media gadobenic acid (also known as gadobenate dimeglumine; MultiHance) and gadoxetic acid (Primovist) has been limited to delayed phase liver imaging only.
