= Gestaclone =

Chemical compound

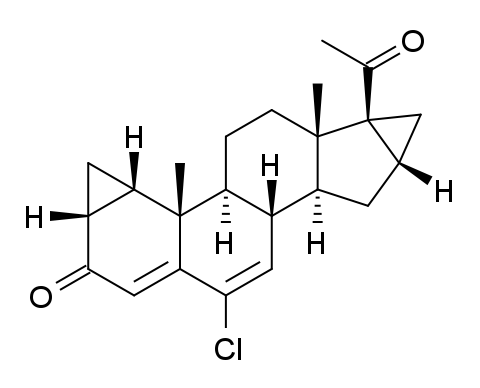

Clinical data
- ATC code: None

Identifiers
- IUPAC name: (2aR,3aS,3bS,3cS,5aS,5bS,6aS,7aS,7bS)-5b-acetyl-9-chloro-3b,5a-dimethyl-2a,3,3a,3b,3c,4,5,5a,5b,6,6a,7,7a,7b-tetradecahydro-2H-cyclopropa[3,4]cyclopenta[1,2-a]cyclopropa[g]phenanthren-2-one
- CAS Number: 19291-69-1
- PubChem CID: 11726670
- ChemSpider: 9901386
- UNII: Q4K0SC8TFY
- CompTox Dashboard (EPA): DTXSID401030321

Chemical and physical data
- Formula: C_{23}H_{27}ClO_{2}
- Molar mass: 370.92 g·mol^{−1}
- 3D model (JSmol): Interactive image
- SMILES: O=C5\C=C4\C(\Cl)=C/[C@@H]1[C@H](CC[C@@]2([C@@]3(C(=O)C)[C@@H](C[C@@H]12)C3)C)[C@@]4(C)[C@H]6C[C@@H]56
- InChI: InChI=1S/C23H27ClO2/c1-11(25)23-10-12(23)6-16-13-8-19(24)18-9-20(26)14-7-17(14)22(18,3)15(13)4-5-21(16,23)2/h8-9,12-17H,4-7,10H2,1-3H3/t12-,13+,14+,15-,16-,17-,21-,22-,23-/m0/s1; Key:VUWYSFAIXUWQRQ-VMKBGRNBSA-N

Gestaclone (INN, USAN) (developmental code name SH-1040), also known as 6-chloro-1α,2α:16α,17-bismethylene-4,6-pregnadiene-3,20-dione, is a steroidal progestin of unique chemical structure derived from progesterone that was first described in 1967 and was never marketed.

== Synthesis ==
Synthesis: Patent:
