= Gadoversetamide =

Chemical compound

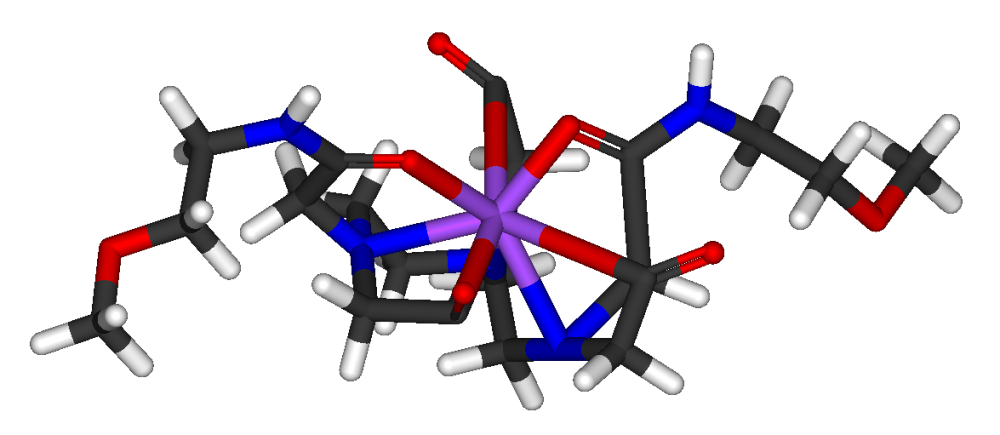

Clinical data
- AHFS/Drugs.com: Micromedex Detailed Consumer Information
- License data: EU EMA: by INN
- Routes of administration: Intravenous
- ATC code: V08CA06 (WHO)

Pharmacokinetic data
- Protein binding: Nil
- Metabolism: Nil
- Elimination half-life: 80 to 120 minutes
- Excretion: Renal

Identifiers
- CAS Number: 131069-91-5
- PubChem CID: 6435809
- DrugBank: DB00538
- ChemSpider: 392041
- UNII: RLM74T3Z9D
- KEGG: D01646
- ChEMBL: ChEMBL1200457
- CompTox Dashboard (EPA): DTXSID10156865

Chemical and physical data
- Formula: C_{20}H_{34}GdN_{5}O_{10}
- Molar mass: 661.77 g·mol^{−1}
- 3D model (JSmol): Interactive image
- SMILES: [Gd+3].O=C(NCCOC)CN(CC([O-])=O)CCN(CC([O-])=O)CCN(CC(=O)NCCOC)CC([O-])=O
- InChI: InChI=1S/C20H37N5O10.Gd/c1-34-9-3-21-16(26)11-24(14-19(30)31)7-5-23(13-18(28)29)6-8-25(15-20(32)33)12-17(27)22-4-10-35-2;/h3-15H2,1-2H3,(H,21,26)(H,22,27)(H,28,29)(H,30,31)(H,32,33);/q;+3/p-3; Key:HBEAOBRDTOXWRZ-UHFFFAOYSA-K

Gadoversetamide is a gadolinium-based MRI contrast agent, particularly for imaging of the brain, spine and liver. It is marketed under the trade name OptiMARK.
