= Xanthomycin A =

Names
- Other names Guamecycline; Tetrabiguanide

Identifiers
| CAS Number | 16545-11-2 |
| 3D model (JSmol) | Interactive image |
| ChemSpider | 58190541 |
| ECHA InfoCard | 100.036.904 |
| PubChem CID | 54688683 |
| UNII | 4NQR4R6G3S |
| CompTox Dashboard (EPA) | DTXSID301043159 |
- InChI: InChI=1S/C29H38N8O8/c1-28(44)13-5-4-6-16(38)17(13)21(39)18-14(28)11-15-20(35(2)3)22(40)19(24(42)29(15,45)23(18)41)25(43)33-12-36-7-9-37(10-8-36)27(32)34-26(30)31/h4-6,14-15,20,38-39,42,44-45H,7-12H2,1-3H3,(H,33,43)(H5,30,31,32,34)/t14-,15-,20-,28+,29-/m0/s1 Key: FAMUIRDLAWWMCQ-AQFAATAFSA-N
- SMILES: C[C@]1(c2cccc(c2C(=C3[C@@H]1C[C@H]4[C@@H](C(=O)C(=C([C@]4(C3=O)O)O)C(=O)NCN5CCN(CC5)C(=N)N=C(N)N)N(C)C)O)O)O

Properties
| Chemical formula | C_{29}H_{38}N_{8}O_{8} |
| Molar mass | 626.671 g·mol^{−1} |
- Except where otherwise noted, data are given for materials in their standard state (at 25 °C [77 °F], 100 kPa). Infobox references

Xanthomycin A is an antibiotic with in vitro antitumor activity isolated from Streptomyces.
