= Gadopentetic acid =

Complex of gadolinium by DTPA

Clinical data
- Trade names: Magnevist
- Other names: gadopentetate dimeglumine (USAN US)
- AHFS/Drugs.com: Consumer Drug Information
- Routes of administration: Intravenous
- ATC code: V08CA01 (WHO)

Legal status
- Legal status: CA: ℞-only; US: ℞-only; EU: Rx-only

Pharmacokinetic data
- Elimination half-life: Distribution half-life 12 minutes, elimination half-life 100 minutes

Identifiers
- CAS Number: 86050-77-3
- PubChem CID: 6857474
- DrugBank: DB00789
- ChemSpider: 50087
- UNII: RH248G8V27
- KEGG: D01707
- ChEBI: CHEBI:31797
- ChEMBL: ChEMBL1200431
- CompTox Dashboard (EPA): DTXSID70235367

Chemical and physical data
- Formula: C_{14}H_{20}GdN_{3}O_{10}
- Molar mass: 547.58 g·mol^{−1}
- 3D model (JSmol): Interactive image
- SMILES: [Gd+3].[O-]C(=O)CN(CCN(CC(=O)O)CC([O-])=O)CCN(CC([O-])=O)CC(=O)O.O[C@H]([C@@H](O)CNC)[C@H](O)[C@H](O)CO.O[C@@H](CNC)[C@@H](O)[C@H](O)[C@H](O)CO
- InChI: InChI=1S/C14H23N3O10.2C7H17NO5.Gd/c18-10(19)5-15(1-3-16(6-11(20)21)7-12(22)23)2-4-17(8-13(24)25)9-14(26)27;2*1-8-2-4(10)6(12)7(13)5(11)3-9;/h1-9H2,(H,18,19)(H,20,21)(H,22,23)(H,24,25)(H,26,27);2*4-13H,2-3H2,1H3;/q;;;+3/p-3/t;2*4-,5+,6+,7+;/m.00./s1; Key:LGMLJQFQKXPRGA-VPVMAENOSA-K

Gadopentetic acid, sold under the brand name Magnevist, is a gadolinium-based MRI contrast agent.

It is usually administered as a salt of a complex of gadolinium with DTPA (diethylenetriaminepentacetate) with the chemical formula A_{2}[Gd(DTPA)(H_{2}O)]; when cation A is the protonated form of the amino sugar meglumine the salt goes under the name "gadopentetate dimeglumine". It was described in 1981 by Hanns-Joachim Weinmann and colleagues and introduced as the first MRI contrast agent in 1987 by the Schering AG. It is used to assist imaging of blood vessels and of inflamed or diseased tissue where the blood vessels become "leaky". It is often used when viewing intracranial lesions with abnormal vascularity or abnormalities in the blood–brain barrier. It is usually injected intravenously. Gd-DTPA is classed as an acyclic, ionic gadolinium contrast medium. Its paramagnetic property reduces the T1 relaxation time (and to some extent the T2 and T2* relaxation times) in NMR, which is the source of its clinical utility.

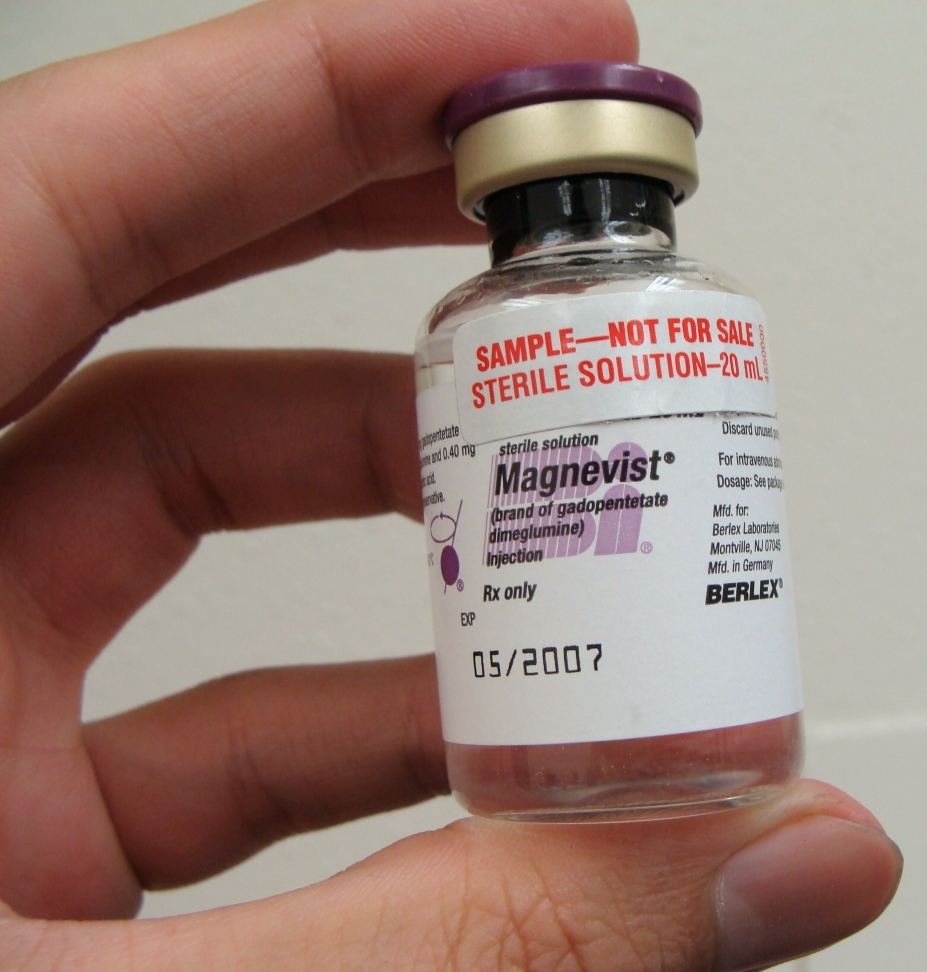
A bottle of Magnevist contrast agent.

Gadolinium based agents may cause a toxic reaction known as nephrogenic systemic fibrosis (NSF) in patients with severe kidney problems.

Compared to other gadolinium-based MRI contrast agents, Gadopentetate dimeglumine (Gd-DTPA2-) chelates allow delayed Gadolinium-enhanced Magnetic Resonance of Cartilage (dGEMRIC). The unique charge characteristic of this complex allows researchers to inversely measure spin–lattice relaxation times as they are related to the concentration of proteoglycan aggregates and charged glycosaminoglycan side chains in articular cartilage.

== Chemical structure and mode of action ==
In the complex of Gd^{3+} and DTPA^{5−} the gadolinium ion is 9-coordinate, surrounded by the 3 nitrogen atoms and 5 oxygen atoms from the carboxylate groups. The ninth coordination site is occupied by a water molecule. This water molecule is labile and exchanges rapidly with water molecules in the immediate vicinity of the gadolinium complex. The gadolinium ion has 7 unpaired electrons with parallel spins and is strongly paramagnetic with an ^{8}S electronic ground state. The relaxation time of the water molecules is affected by their intermittent binding to the paramagnetic centre. This alters their MRI properties and enables contrast enhancement to be achieved.

== Concerns ==
Gadolinium is highly toxic and the accumulation of gadolinium in the brain has become a concern. The EU banned linear chelates in 2017.
