= List of drugs: Io–Ip =

This multi-page article lists pharmaceutical drugs alphabetically by name. Many drugs have more than one name and, therefore, the same drug may be listed more than once. Brand names and generic names are differentiated by capitalizing brand names.

See also the list of the top 100 bestselling branded drugs, ranked by sales.

Abbreviations are used in the list as follows:

- INN = International nonproprietary name
- BAN = British Approved Name
- USAN = United States Adopted Name
- Two-letter codes for countries

Lists of drugs
1–9 | A | B | C | D | E | F | G | H | I | J | K | L | M | N | O | P | Q | R | S | T | U | V | W | X | Y | Z

Ia–Il | Im–In | Io–Ip | Iq–Iz

== io ==
=== iob-iod ===
- iobenguane (131 I) (INN)
- iobenzamic acid (INN)
- iobitridol (INN)
- iobutoic acid (INN)
- iocarmic acid (INN)
- iocetamic acid (INN)
- iodamide (INN)
- iodecimol (INN)
- iodetryl (INN)
- iodinated (125 I) human serum albumin (INN)
- iodinated (131 I) human serum albumin (INN)
- iodine (124 I) girentuximab (INN)
- iodine povacrylex (USAN)
- iodixanol (INN)
- iodocetilic acid (123 I) (INN)
- iodocholesterol (131 I) (INN)
- iodofiltic acid (123 I) (USAN, INN)
- iodophthalein sodium (INN)
- iodothiouracil (INN)
- Iodotope
- iodoxamic acid (INN)

=== iof-iom ===
- iofendylate (INN)
- iofetamine (123 I) (INN)
- ioflupane (123 I) (INN)
- iofratol (INN)
- ioglicic acid (INN)
- ioglucol (INN)
- ioglucomide (INN)
- ioglunide (INN)
- ioglycamic acid (INN)
- iohexol (INN)
- iolidonic acid (INN)
- iolixanic acid (INN)
- iolopride (123 I) (INN)
- iomazenil (123 I) (INN)
- iomeglamic acid (INN)
- iomeprol (INN)
- iomeprol irtemazole (INN)
- Iomervu
- iometin (125 I) (INN)
- iometin (131 I) (INN)
- iometopane (123 I) (INN)
- iomorinic acid (INN)

=== ion-ios ===
- Ionamin
- ioncanlidic acid (123 I) (INN)
- Ionosol
- Iontocaine
- iopamidol (INN)
- iopanoic acid (INN)
- iopentol (INN)
- iophenoic acid (INN)
- Iopidine
- ioprocemic acid (INN)
- iopromide (INN)
- iopronic acid (INN)
- iopydol (INN)
- iopydone (INN)
- iosarcol (INN)
- Iosat
- iosefamic acid (INN)
- ioseric acid (INN)
- iosimenol (USAN)
- iosimide (INN)
- iosulamide (INN)
- iosumetic acid (INN)

=== iot-ioz ===
- iotalamic acid (INN)
- iotasul (INN)
- iotetric acid (INN)
- iotranic acid (INN)
- iotriside (INN)
- iotrizoic acid (INN)
- iotrolan (INN)
- iotroxic acid (INN)
- ioversol (INN)
- ioxabrolic acid (INN)
- ioxaglic acid (INN)
- ioxilan (INN)
- ioxitalamic acid (INN)
- ioxotrizoic acid (INN)
- iozomic acid (INN)

== ip ==
- ipamorelin (INN)
- ipazilide (INN)
- ipenoxazone (INN)
- ipexidine (INN)
- ipidacrine (INN)
- ipilimumab (INN)
- ipragliflozin (INN)
- ipragratine (INN)
- ipramidil (INN)
- ipratropium bromide (INN)
- iprazochrome (INN)
- ipriflavone (INN)
- iprindole (INN)
- Iprivask
- iproclozide (INN)
- iprocrolol (INN)
- iproheptine (INN)
- iproniazid (INN)
- ipronidazole (INN)
- iproplatin (INN)
- iprotiazem (INN)
- iproxamine (INN)
- iprozilamine (INN)
- ipsalazide (INN)
- ipsapirone (INN)
