= Iodine (medical use) =

Topical antiseptic and supplement

Iodine is a chemical element with many uses in medicine, depending on the form. Elemental iodine and iodophors are topical antiseptics. Iodine, in non-elemental form, functions as an essential nutrient in human biology (see iodine in biology). Organic compounds containing iodine are also useful iodinated contrast agents in X-ray imaging.

Common side effects when applied to the skin include irritation and discoloration. Supplementation during pregnancy is recommended in regions where deficiency is common, otherwise it is not recommended. Iodine is an essential trace element.

In 1811, Bernard Courtois isolated iodine from seaweed, and then in 1820 Jean-Francois Coindet linked iodine intake to goiter size. It initially came into use as a disinfectant and a treatment for goiter. The following forms of iodine are found on the World Health Organization's List of Essential Medicines:

- Potassium iodide
- Amidotrizoate
- Iohexol
- Meglumine iotroxat
- Povidone iodine
- "Iodine" – less ambiguously known as iodized oil

In addition, table salt with non-elemental iodine, known as iodized salt, is available in more than 110 countries.

== Forms and formulations ==
=== Elemental iodine ===
Iodine, elemental
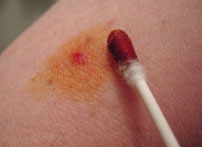

Clinical data
- AHFS/Drugs.com: Monograph
- License data: US DailyMed: Iodine
- Routes of administration: topical
- ATC code: D08AG03 (WHO)

Legal status
- Legal status: CA: ℞-only

Identifiers
- CAS Number: 7553-56-2
- PubChem CID: 807
- DrugBank: DB05382
- ChemSpider: 785
- UNII: 9679TC07X4
- KEGG: D00108
- ChEBI: CHEBI:17606
- ChEMBL: ChEMBL1201225

Chemical and physical data
- Formula: I_{2}

Elemental iodine is used as an antiseptic either as the element, or as the water-soluble triiodide anion I_{3}^{−} generated in situ by adding iodide to poorly water-soluble elemental iodine (the reverse chemical reaction makes some free elemental iodine available for antisepsis).

In the alternative, iodine may be produced from iodophors, which contain iodine complexed with a solubilizing agent (the iodide ion may be thought of loosely as the iodophor in triiodide water solutions). Examples of such preparations include:

- Tincture of iodine: iodine in ethanol, or iodine and sodium iodide in a mixture of ethanol and water.
- Lugol's iodine: iodine and iodide in water alone, forming mostly triiodide. Unlike tincture of iodine, Lugol's iodine has a minimised amount of the free iodine (I_{2}) component.
- Iodine glycerin, a preparation used in dentistry.
- Povidone iodine (an iodophor).
- Iodine-V: iodine (I_{2}) and fulvic acid form a clathrate compound (iodine molecules are "caged" by fulvic acid in this host-guest complex). A water-soluble, solid, stable, crystalline complex. Unlike other iodophors, Iodine-V only contains iodine in molecular (I_{2}) form.

The antimicrobial action of iodine is quick and works at low concentrations, and thus it is used in operating theatres. Its specific mode of action is unknown. It penetrates into microorganisms and attacks particular amino acids (such as cysteine and methionine), nucleotides, and fatty acids, ultimately resulting in cell death. It also has an antiviral action, but nonlipid viruses and parvoviruses are less sensitive than lipid enveloped viruses. Iodine probably attacks surface proteins of enveloped viruses, and it may also destabilise membrane fatty acids by reacting with unsaturated carbon bonds.

=== Iodine-containing salts ===
As a nutrient, iodine enters cells as the iodide ion; iodide is also the form of iodine found in food such as kelp.

The form of iodide salt most commonly used medically is potassium iodide. At low doses, it is one of the options for making iodized salt, along with the more stable potassium iodate. A saturated solution of potassium iodide is used to treat acute thyrotoxicosis. It is also used to block uptake of iodine-131 in the thyroid gland (see isotopes section above), when this isotope is used as part of radiopharmaceuticals (such as iobenguane) that are not targeted to the thyroid or thyroid-type tissues.

Iodine-131 (usually as iodide) is a component of nuclear fallout, and is particularly dangerous owing to the thyroid gland's propensity to concentrate ingested iodine and retain it for periods longer than this isotope's radiological half-life of eight days. For this reason, people at risk of exposure to environmental radioactive iodine (iodine-131) in fallout may be instructed to take non-radioactive potassium iodide tablets. The typical adult dose is one 130 mg tablet per 24 hours, supplying 100 mg (100,000 micrograms) of ionic iodine (the typical daily dose of iodine for normal health is on the order of 100 micrograms). Ingestion of this large dose of non-radioactive iodine minimises the uptake of radioactive iodine by the thyroid gland.

Before the advent of organic chelating agents, salts of iodide were given orally in the treatment of lead or mercury poisoning, such as heavily popularized by Louis Melsens and many nineteenth and early twentieth century doctors.

=== Organoiodine compounds ===
Diatrizoic acid, an iodine-containing radiocontrast agent

As an element with high electron density and atomic number, iodine absorbs X-rays weaker than 33.3 keV due to the photoelectric effect of the innermost electrons. Organoiodine compounds are used with intravenous injection as X-ray radiocontrast agents. This application is often in conjunction with advanced X-ray techniques such as angiography and CT scanning. At present, all water-soluble radiocontrast agents rely on iodine-containing compounds.

- Iohexol (contrast agent)
- Amidotrizoate (contrast agent)
- Meglumine iotroxate (contrast agent)
- Iopanoic acid (contrast agent)

Iodized oil, made by reacting ether esters of fatty acids form vegetable oil with hydroiodic acid, is another important organoiodine preparation. As an iodine supplement, it is given by mouth once per year to prevent endemic goiter in remote communities. It is also used as a non-water-soluble radiocontrast.

Other organoiodine drugs include:

- Amiodarone, an antiarrhythmic drug.
- Iodinated glycerol, historically used as a mucolytic.

== See also ==
- Isotopes of iodine – lists isotopes with medical uses
