= C12H11I3N2O4 =

The molecular formula C_{12}H_{11}I_{3}N_{2}O_{4} (molar mass: 627.940 g/mol) may refer to:

- Iodamide
- Metrizoic acid
