= C20H28I3N3O9 =

The molecular formula C_{20}H_{28}I_{3}N_{3}O_{9} (molar mass: 835.164 g/mol) may refer to:

- Iobitridol
- Iopentol
