= C18H24I3N3O8 =

The molecular formula C_{18}H_{24}I_{3}N_{3}O_{8} (molar mass: 791.112 g/mol, exact mass: 790.8698 u) may refer to:

- Iopromide
- Ioxilan
