= Acetrizoic acid =

Chemical compound

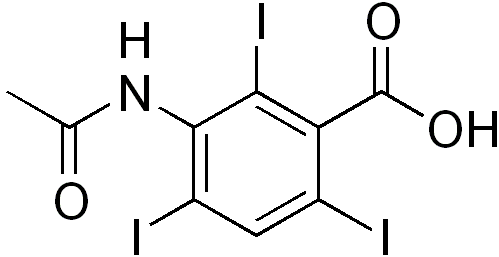

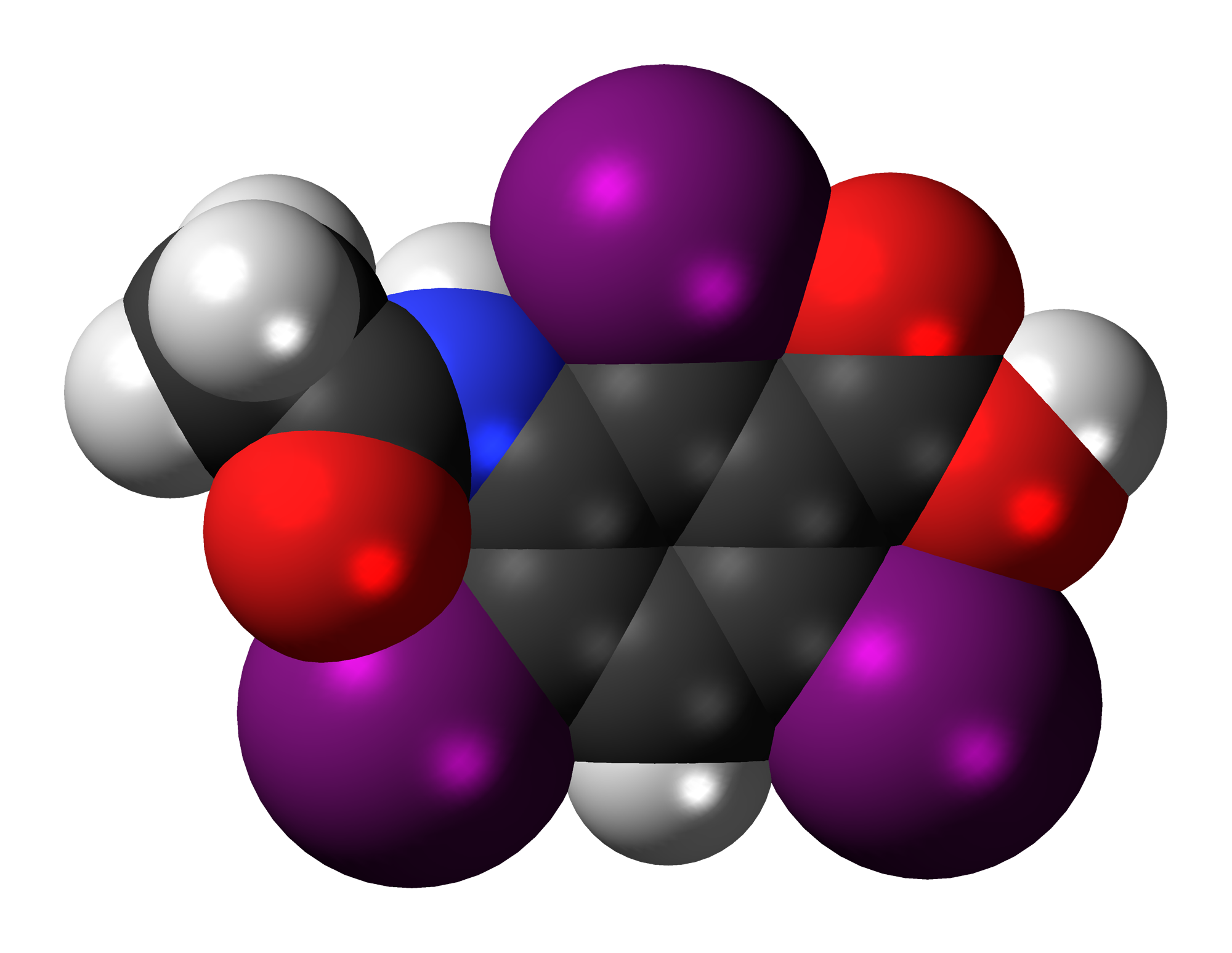

Clinical data
- Trade names: Urokon, Triurol, Salpix, others
- AHFS/Drugs.com: International Drug Names
- ATC code: V08AA07 (WHO)

Identifiers
- IUPAC name: 3-Acetamido-2,4,6-triiodobenzoic acid
- CAS Number: 85-36-9; Na salt: 129-63-5
- PubChem CID: 6806; Na salt: 8517
- DrugBank: DB09347
- ChemSpider: 6547; Na salt: 8203
- UNII: 24256BQV7M; Na salt: 5GF4B2I1DD
- KEGG: D02457
- ChEMBL: ChEMBL1201327; Na salt: ChEMBL1201045
- CompTox Dashboard (EPA): DTXSID2022549
- ECHA InfoCard: 100.001.455

Chemical and physical data
- Formula: C_{9}H_{6}I_{3}NO_{3}
- Molar mass: 556.864 g·mol^{−1}
- 3D model (JSmol): Interactive image
- SMILES: O=C(Nc1c(I)c(c(I)cc1I)C(=O)O)C
- InChI: InChI=1S/C9H6I3NO3/c1-3(14)13-8-5(11)2-4(10)6(7(8)12)9(15)16/h2H,1H3,(H,13,14)(H,15,16); Key:GNOGSFBXBWBTIG-UHFFFAOYSA-N

Acetrizoic acid is a pharmaceutical drug that was used as an iodinated contrast medium for X-ray imaging. It was applied in form of its salt, sodium acetrizoate, but is no longer in clinical use.

== Chemistry and mechanism of action ==
The substance has high osmolality and is water-soluble. The three iodine atoms in the molecule readily absorb X-rays and are therefore responsible for its usability as a contrast medium.

== History ==
Acetrizoate was developed by V.H. Wallingford of Mallinckrodt, and introduced in 1950; it was employed as a contrast agent for several radiographic studies, including pyelography, angiography of the brain, carotid arteries and the aorta, and cholecystography. It was soon found to be highly toxic to the kidneys and nervous system—work urging caution in its administration was published as early as 1959, after reports of adverse reactions ranging from hypersensitivity to brain damage—and was eventually replaced by other agents with higher efficacy and lower toxicity, such as sodium diatrizoate, a closely related compound.

== Trade names ==
Trade names include Urokon, Triurol and Salpix, as well as Gastrografina and Urografina in Portugal.
