= Mangafodipir =

Chemical compound

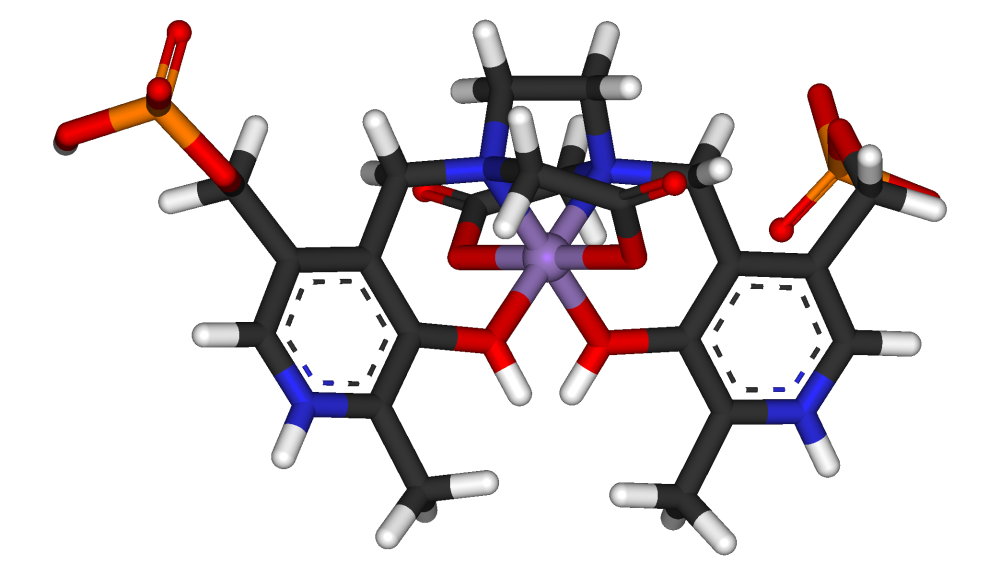

Clinical data
- AHFS/Drugs.com: Micromedex Detailed Consumer Information
- Pregnancy category: Not to be used
- Routes of administration: Intravenous infusion
- ATC code: V08CA05 (WHO)

Pharmacokinetic data
- Bioavailability: NA
- Protein binding: 27% (manganese); Negligible (DPDP)
- Elimination half-life: 20 minutes (manganese); 50 minutes (DPDP)
- Excretion: Renal and fecal (manganese); Renal (DPDP)

Identifiers
- CAS Number: 155319-91-8
- PubChem CID: 76967443
- ChemSpider: 4885577
- UNII: N02W67RKJS
- ChEMBL: ChEMBL1628235

Chemical and physical data
- Formula: C_{22}H_{28}MnN_{4}O_{14}P_{2}
- Molar mass: 689.366 g·mol^{−1}
- 3D model (JSmol): Interactive image
- SMILES: O=P(O)(O)OCc0cnc(C)c([O+H][Mn-4]12345)c0C[N+]1(CC(=O)O2)CC[N+]3(CC(=O)O4)Cc0c([O+H]5)c(C)ncc0COP(O)(O)=O
- InChI: InChI=1S/C22H32N4O14P2.Mn/c1-13-21(31)17(15(5-23-13)11-39-41(33,34)35)7-25(9-19(27)28)3-4-26(10-20(29)30)8-18-16(12-40-42(36,37)38)6-24-14(2)22(18)32;/h5-6,31-32H,3-4,7-12H2,1-2H3,(H,27,28)(H,29,30)(H2,33,34,35)(H2,36,37,38);/q;+2/p-2; Key:QDQFSBKXQQZVTB-UHFFFAOYSA-L

Mangafodipir (sold under the brand name Teslascan as mangafodipir trisodium) is a contrast agent delivered intravenously to enhance contrast in magnetic resonance imaging (MRI) of the liver, and has potential to serve as an adjunct for various chemotherapeutic agents and during coronary intervention. It has two parts, a paramagnetic manganese(II) ion and the fodipir (dipyridoxyl diphosphate, DPDP) chelating agent. When freed from the organic ligand, the manganese shortens the longitudinal relaxation time (T1) in an MRI scan. Normal liver tissue absorbs the manganese more than abnormal or cancerous tissue, which makes the normal tissue appear brighter in MRIs. This enhanced contrast allows lesions to be more easily identified.

Mangafodipir was withdrawn from the US market in 2003 and the European market in 2012 for commercial reasons by the manufacturer.

Reactive oxygen species (ROS) and reactive nitrogen species (RNS) participate in pathological tissue damage. Mitochondrial manganese superoxide dismutase (MnSOD) normally keeps ROS and RNS in check. During development of mangafodipir as an MRI contrast agent, it was discovered that it possessed MnSOD mimetic activity. Mangafodipir has been tested as a chemotherapy adjunct in cancer patients and as an adjunct to percutaneous coronary intervention in patients with myocardial infarctions, with promising results.

Mangafodipir has shown promising results in human brain imaging without detectable toxicity and usefulness in detecting lesions in multiple sclerosis.

Whereas MRI contrast depends on release of Mn^{2+}, the MnSOD mimetic activity depends on Mn^{2+} that remains bound to DPDP. Calmangafodipir [Ca_{4}Mn(DPDP)_{5}] (brand name PledOx) is stabilized with respect to Mn^{2+} and has improved therapeutic activity. Calmangafodipir is being explored as a chemotherapy adjunct in cancer patients.
