= Tyropanoic acid =

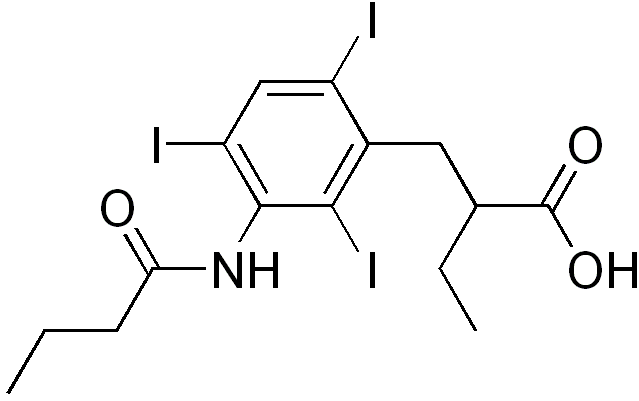

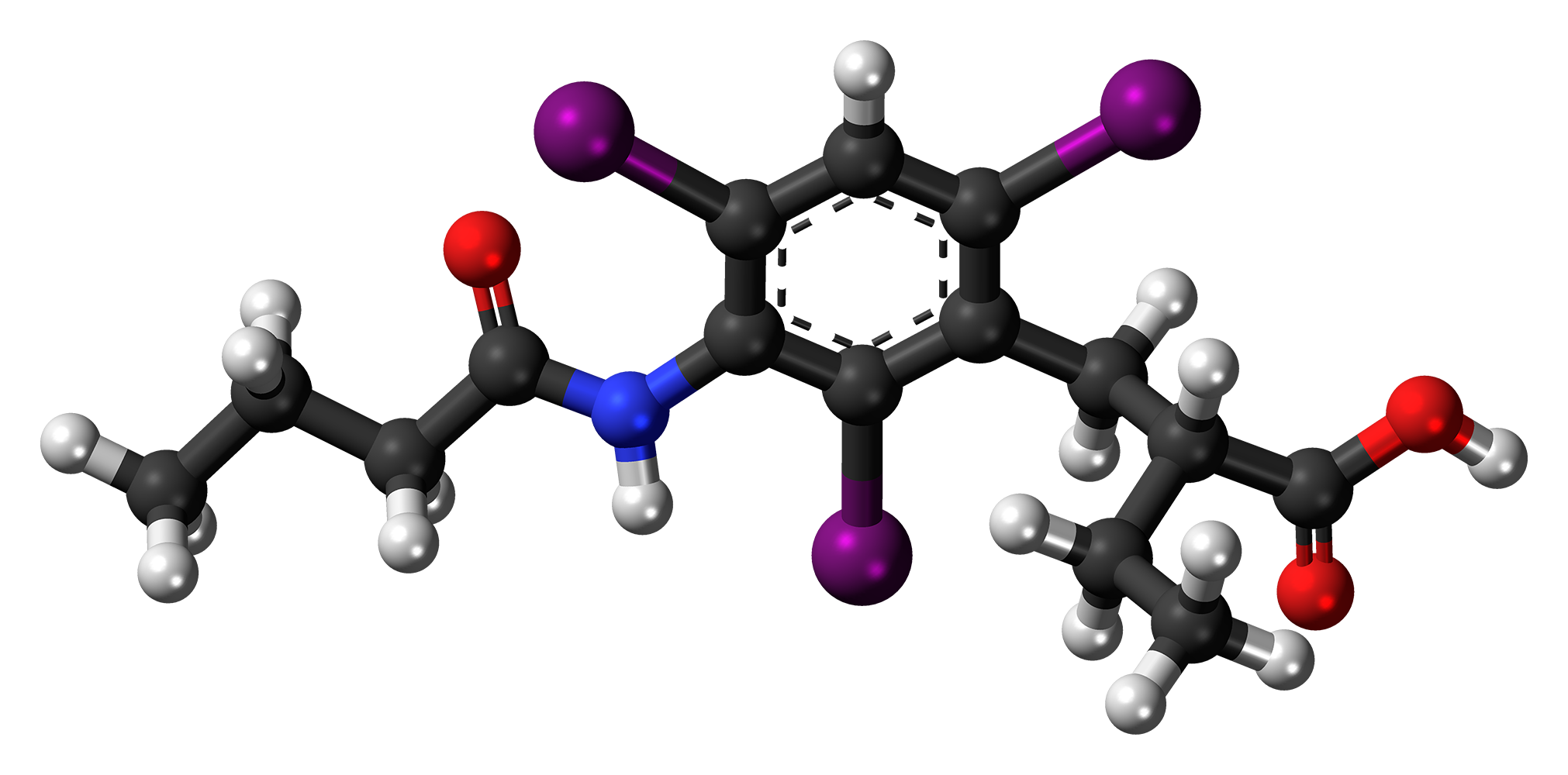

Names
- Preferred IUPAC name 2-[(3-Butanamido-2,4,6-triiodophenyl)methyl]butanoic acid
- Other names 2-(3-Butyramido-2,4,6-triiodobenzyl)butanoic acid 2-[[2,4,6-Triiodo-3-(1-oxobutylamino)phenyl]methyl]butanoic acid

Identifiers
CAS Number	27293-82-9
3D model (JSmol)	Interactive image
ChEMBL	ChEMBL1201261
ChemSpider	5409
ECHA InfoCard	100.043.976
EC Number	248-389-8
KEGG	D01884
MeSH	D014441
PubChem CID	5611
UNII	4F05V145YR
CompTox Dashboard (EPA)	DTXSID5048269
- InChI: InChI=1S/C15H18I3NO3/c1-3-5-12(20)19-14-11(17)7-10(16)9(13(14)18)6-8(4-2)15(21)22/h7-8H,3-6H2,1-2H3,(H,19,20)(H,21,22) Key: YMOXVLQZFAUUKI-UHFFFAOYSA-N
- SMILES: CCCC(=O)NC1=C(C=C(C(=C1I)CC(CC)C(=O)O)I)I

Properties
Chemical formula	C_{15}H_{18}I_{3}NO_{3}
Molar mass	641.02 g/mol

Pharmacology
ATC code	V08AC09 (WHO)
- Except where otherwise noted, data are given for materials in their standard state (at 25 °C [77 °F], 100 kPa). verify (what is ?) Infobox references

Tyropanoic acid and its salt sodium tyropanoate are radiocontrast agents used in cholecystography (X-ray diagnosis of gallstones). Trade names include Bilopaque, Lumopaque, Tyropaque, and Bilopac. This molecule contains three heavy iodine atoms which obstruct X-rays in the same way as the calcium in bones to produce a visible image. After injection it is rapidly excreted into the bile.
