= Metrizamide =

Chemical compound

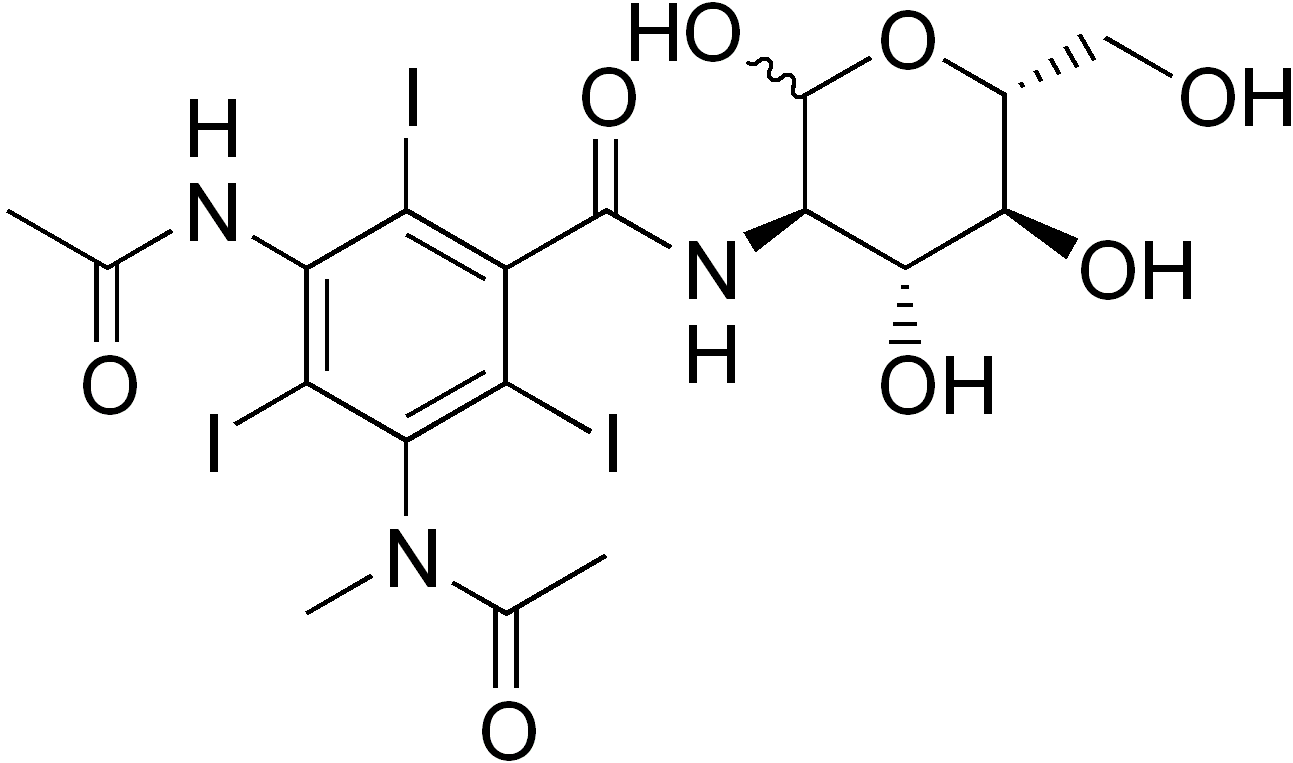

Clinical data
- Trade names: Amipaque
- Other names: 3-aAcetamido-2,4,6-triiodo-5-(N-methylacetamido)-N-[(3R,4R,5S,6R)-2,4,5-trihydroxy-6-(hydroxymethyl)oxan-3-yl]benzamide
- AHFS/Drugs.com: Micromedex Detailed Consumer Information
- ATC code: V08AB01 (WHO)

Identifiers
- IUPAC name: 2-({3-(Acetylamino)-5-[acetyl(methyl)amino]-2,4,6-triiodobenzoyl}amino)-2-deoxy-D-glucopyranose
- CAS Number: 31112-62-6
- PubChem CID: 443944
- DrugBank: DB01578
- ChemSpider: 391998
- UNII: RHH3W8F1CO
- KEGG: D01311
- ChEMBL: ChEMBL1200889
- CompTox Dashboard (EPA): DTXSID1023310
- ECHA InfoCard: 100.045.872

Chemical and physical data
- Formula: C_{18}H_{22}I_{3}N_{3}O_{8}
- Molar mass: 789.100 g·mol^{−1}

Metrizamide is a non-ionic iodine-based radiocontrast agent. It is also a density gradient medium for the centrifugation of biological particles.

Historically metrizamide replaced both iodized oil (trade names: Ethiodol, Lipiodol) and iofendylate (trade names: Pantopaque, Myodil) as the contrast agent of choice for myelography (an X-ray study of the spine now largely replaced by MRI). The radio opacity characteristics are such that finer detail is displayed with metrizamide, as well as the advantage of reabsorption from spinal fluid and excretion from the body – since unlike iofendylate, metrizamide is a water-soluble substance.

All three agents are administered by lumbar puncture (also referred to as a spinal tap or cisternal puncture), at the cervicocranial junction. The human patient is rolled from the lateral decubitus (lying on the side) to prone. Ankles are strapped to the end of a hard X-ray, CT, or MRI table. To obtain images of the cervical region the patient is then carefully tilted in the Trendelenberg position (head down) so the contrast agent (particularly iofendylate) can enter the neck region. Care is given to prevent spilling dye into the posterior cranial fossa (back of the head) or to enter the cranial cavity in general. This speaks to the inability to remove the heavier or more viscous iofendylate without aspirating it with spinal fluid through a lumbar puncture needle in the low back (sticking up vertically) or back of the neck. Removal of iofendylate is necessary since it is not water-soluble. With metrizamide the issue is that if entering the cranial cavity and high dose exposure to the blood brain barrier, side effects are more likely encountered. Issues related to absorption into the general circulation are also encountered.

== Side effects ==
- Headache
- Nausea
- Vomiting
- Mass effect, herniation, and major central nervous system complications including spinal cord compression
- Seizures
- Muscle rigidity and dystonic reaction
- Aphasia
- Adverse neurobehavioral reactions

== History ==
Metrizamide was approved in the US in 1978. Its marketing is discontinued as of 2021.
