= Methiodal =

Chemical compound

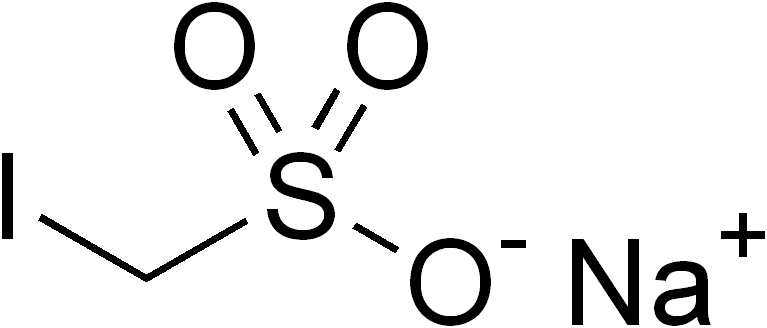

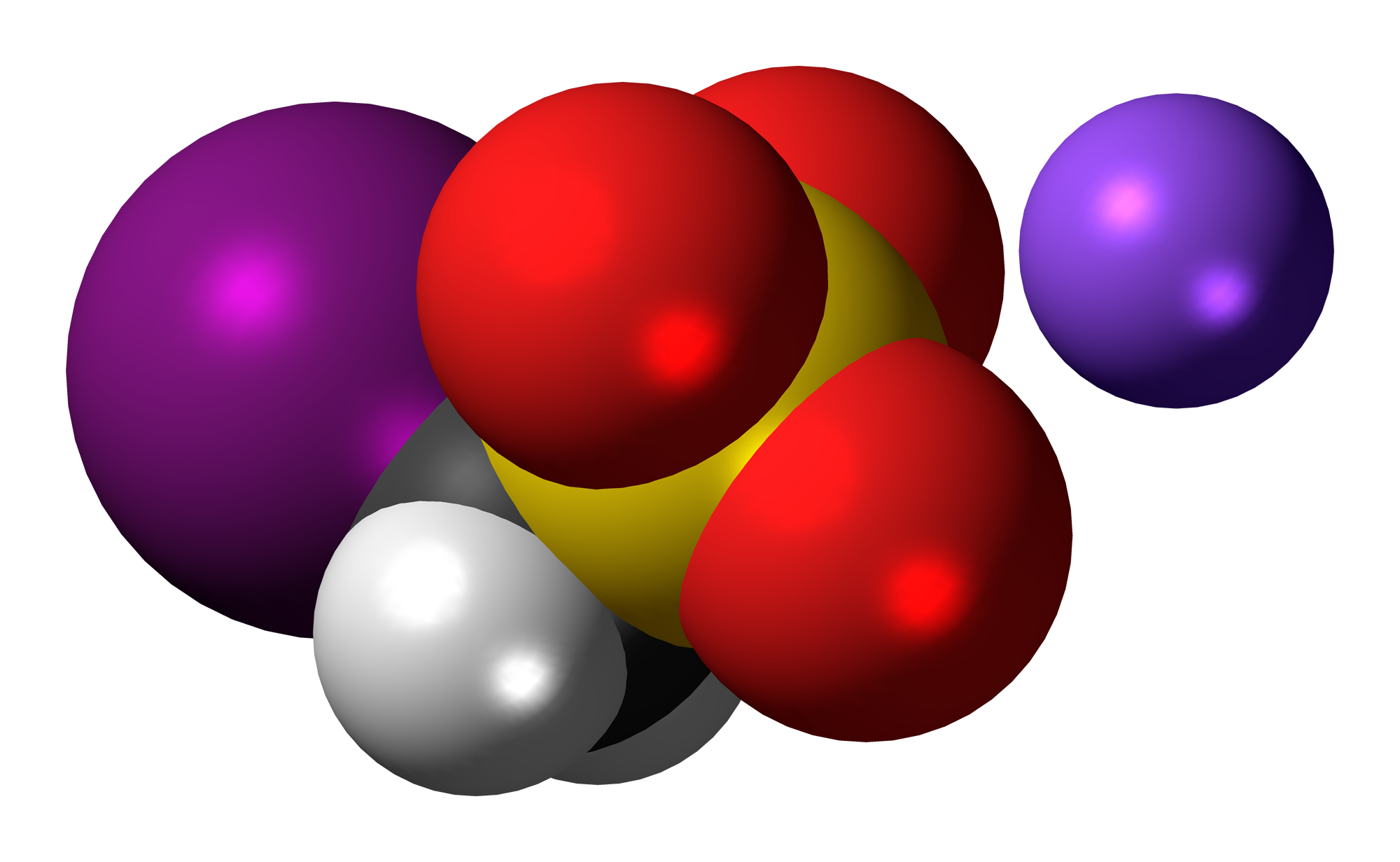

Clinical data
- Trade names: Abrodil, Conturex, Kontrast U
- ATC code: V08AA09 (WHO)

Identifiers
- IUPAC name: Sodium iodomethanesulfonate
- CAS Number: 143-47-5; Sodium salt: 126-31-8
- PubChem CID: 23662381
- DrugBank: DB13321
- ChemSpider: 29078
- UNII: H20847G0I0; Sodium salt: 3880P18UBM
- KEGG: D09213
- CompTox Dashboard (EPA): DTXSID701035794
- ECHA InfoCard: 100.004.348

Chemical and physical data
- Formula: CH_{2}INaO_{3}S
- Molar mass: 243.98 g·mol^{−1}
- 3D model (JSmol): Interactive image
- SMILES: C(S(=O)(=O)[O-])I.[Na+]
- InChI: InChI=1S/CH3IO3S.Na/c2-1-6(3,4)5;/h1H2,(H,3,4,5);/q;+1/p-1; Key:COCJIVDXXCJXND-UHFFFAOYSA-M

Methiodal is a pharmaceutical drug that was used as an iodinated contrast medium for X-ray imaging. Its uses included myelography (imaging of the spinal cord); for this use, cases of adhesive arachnoiditis have been reported, similar to those seen under the contrast medium iofendylate.

It is not known to be marketed anywhere in the world in 2021.
