= Propyliodone =

Chemical compound

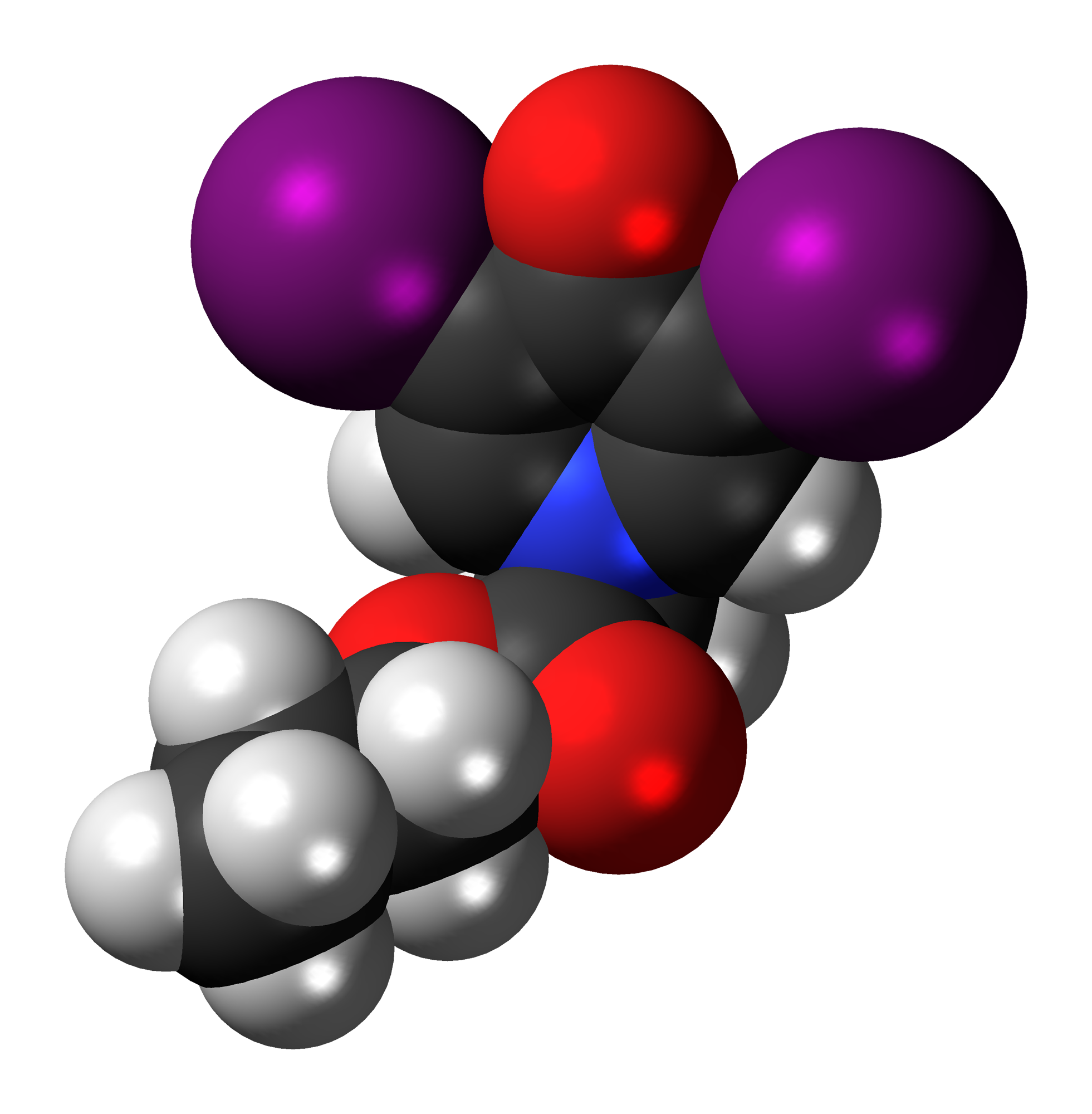

Clinical data
- Other names: propyl (3,5-diiodo-4-oxopyridin-1(4H)-yl)acetate
- ATC code: V08AD03 (WHO)

Identifiers
- IUPAC name: propyl 2-(3,5-diiodo-4-oxo-1,4-dihydropyridin-1-yl)acetate
- CAS Number: 587-61-1
- PubChem CID: 4949
- ChemSpider: 4780
- UNII: 5NPJ6BPX36
- ChEMBL: ChEMBL1200821
- CompTox Dashboard (EPA): DTXSID6023527
- ECHA InfoCard: 100.008.731

Chemical and physical data
- Formula: C_{10}H_{11}I_{2}NO_{3}
- Molar mass: 447.011 g·mol^{−1}
- 3D model (JSmol): Interactive image
- SMILES: CCCOC(=O)CN1C=C(C(=O)C(=C1)I)I
- InChI: InChI=1S/C10H11I2NO3/c1-2-3-16-9(14)6-13-4-7(11)10(15)8(12)5-13/h4-5H,2-3,6H2,1H3; Key:ROSXARVHJNYYDO-UHFFFAOYSA-N

Propyliodone (INN, trade name Dionosil) is a molecule used as a contrast medium in bronchography. It was developed by a team at Imperial Chemical Industries in the late 1930s.
