= ATC code V08 =

ATC code V08 Contrast media is a therapeutic subgroup of the Anatomical Therapeutic Chemical Classification System, a system of alphanumeric codes developed by the World Health Organization (WHO) for the classification of drugs and other medical products. Subgroup V08 is part of the anatomical group V Various.

Codes for veterinary use (ATCvet codes) can be created by placing the letter Q in front of the human ATC code: for example, QV08.
National versions of the ATC classification may include additional codes not present in this list, which follows the WHO version.

== V08A X-ray contrast media, iodinated ==
=== V08AA Water-soluble, nephrotropic, high osmolar X-ray contrast media ===
V08AA01 Diatrizoic acid
V08AA02 Metrizoic acid
V08AA03 Iodamide
V08AA04 Iotalamic acid
V08AA05 Ioxitalamic acid
V08AA06 Ioglicic acid
V08AA07 Acetrizoic acid
V08AA08 Iocarmic acid
V08AA09 Methiodal
V08AA10 Diodone

=== V08AB Water-soluble, nephrotropic, low osmolar X-ray contrast media ===
V08AB01 Metrizamide
V08AB02 Iohexol
V08AB03 Ioxaglic acid
V08AB04 Iopamidol
V08AB05 Iopromide
V08AB06 Iotrolan
V08AB07 Ioversol
V08AB08 Iopentol
V08AB09 Iodixanol
V08AB10 Iomeprol
V08AB11 Iobitridol
V08AB12 Ioxilan

=== V08AC Water-soluble, hepatotropic X-ray contrast media ===
V08AC01 Iodoxamic acid
V08AC02 Iotroxic acid
V08AC03 Ioglycamic acid
V08AC04 Adipiodone
V08AC05 Iobenzamic acid
V08AC06 Iopanoic acid
V08AC07 Iocetamic acid
V08AC08 Sodium iopodate
V08AC09 Tyropanoic acid
V08AC10 Calcium iopodate
V08CA11 Gadofosveset
V08CA12 Gadopiclenol
V08CA13 Gadoquatrane

=== V08AD Non-watersoluble X-ray contrast media ===
V08AD01 Ethyl esters of iodised fatty acids
V08AD02 Iopydol
V08AD03 Propyliodone
V08AD04 Iofendylate

== V08B X-ray contrast media, non-iodinated ==
=== V08BA Barium sulfate containing X-ray contrast media ===
V08BA01 Barium sulfate with suspending agents
V08BA02 Barium sulfate without suspending agents

== V08C Magnetic resonance imaging contrast media ==
=== V08CA Paramagnetic contrast media ===
V08CA01 Gadopentetic acid
V08CA02 Gadoteric acid
V08CA03 Gadodiamide
V08CA04 Gadoteridol
V08CA05 Mangafodipir
V08CA06 Gadoversetamide
V08CA07 Ferric ammonium citrate
V08CA08 Gadobenic acid
V08CA09 Gadobutrol
V08CA10 Gadoxetic acid
V08CA11 Gadofosveset
V08CA12 Gadopiclenol
V08CA13 Gadoquatrane

=== V08CB Superparamagnetic contrast media ===
V08CB01 Ferumoxsil
V08CB02 Ferristene
V08CB03 Iron oxide, nanoparticles

=== V08CX Other magnetic resonance imaging contrast media ===
V08CX01 Perflubron

== V08D Ultrasound contrast media ==
=== V08DA Ultrasound contrast media ===
V08DA01 Perflutren, human albumin microspheres
V08DA02 Microparticles of galactose
V08DA03 Perflenapent
V08DA04 Perflutren, phospholipid microspheres
V08DA05 Sulfur hexafluoride, phospholipid microspheres
V08DA06 Perflubutane, phospholipid microspheres
