= Ioxitalamic acid =

Chemical compound

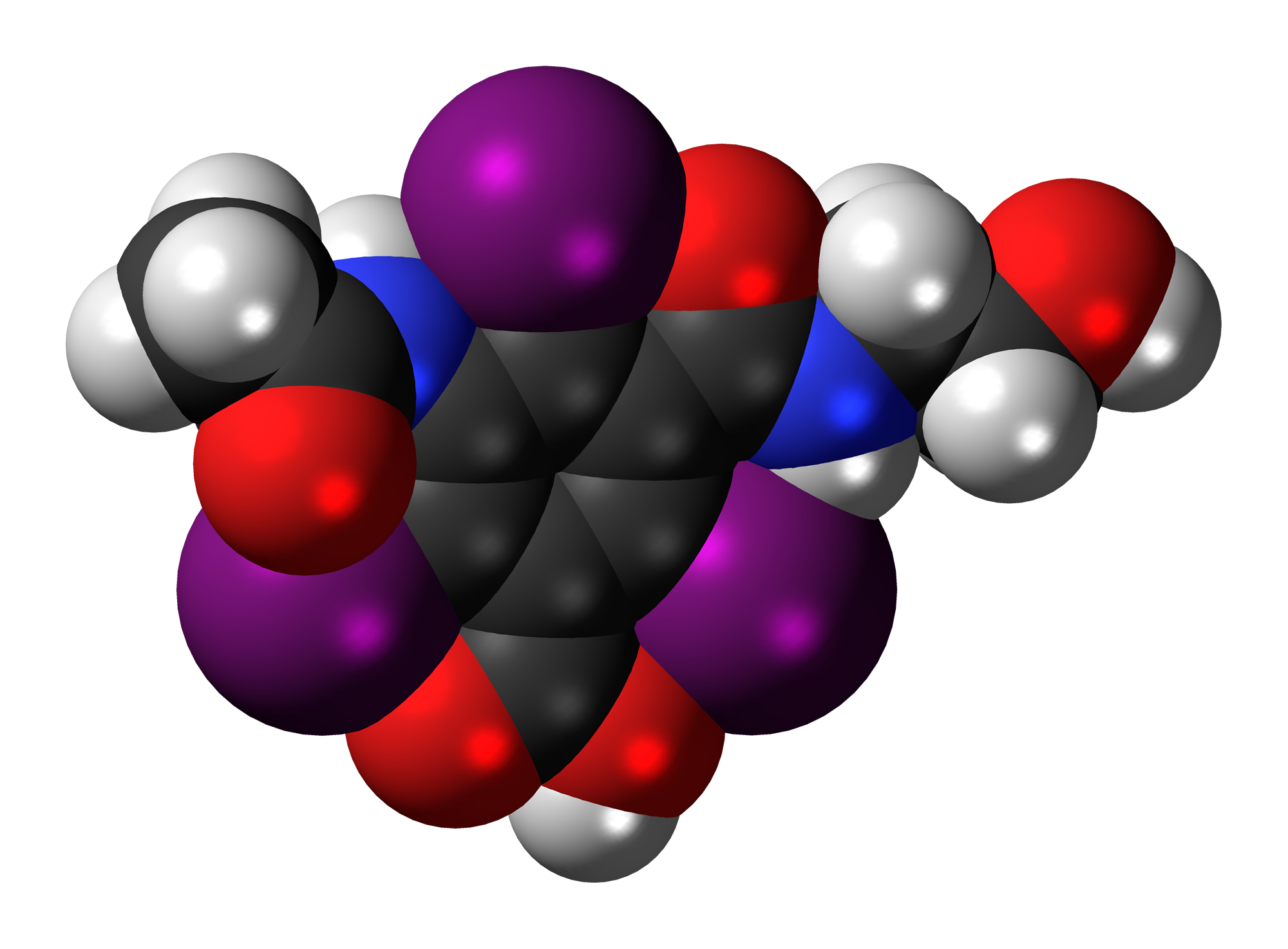

Clinical data
- AHFS/Drugs.com: International Drug Names
- ATC code: V08AA05 (WHO)

Identifiers
- IUPAC name: 3-acetamido-5-[(2-hydroxyethyl)carbamoyl]-2,4,6-triiodobenzoic acid
- CAS Number: 28179-44-4
- PubChem CID: 34536
- ChemSpider: 31782
- UNII: 967RDI7Z6K
- KEGG: D07418
- ChEBI: CHEBI:83517
- ChEMBL: ChEMBL2107239
- CompTox Dashboard (EPA): DTXSID60182457
- ECHA InfoCard: 100.044.428

Chemical and physical data
- Formula: C_{12}H_{11}I_{3}N_{2}O_{5}
- Molar mass: 643.942 g·mol^{−1}
- 3D model (JSmol): Interactive image
- SMILES: CC(=O)NC1=C(C(=C(C(=C1I)C(=O)O)I)C(=O)NCCO)I
- InChI: InChI=1S/C12H11I3N2O5/c1-4(19)17-10-8(14)5(11(20)16-2-3-18)7(13)6(9(10)15)12(21)22/h18H,2-3H2,1H3,(H,16,20)(H,17,19)(H,21,22); Key:OLAOYPRJVHUHCF-UHFFFAOYSA-N

Ioxitalamic acid (brand name Telebrix) is a pharmaceutical drug used as an iodinated contrast medium for X-ray imaging. It is used in form of its salts, ioxitalamate sodium and ioxitalamate meglumine. It was first marketed in 1970.
