= Ioglicic acid =

Chemical compound

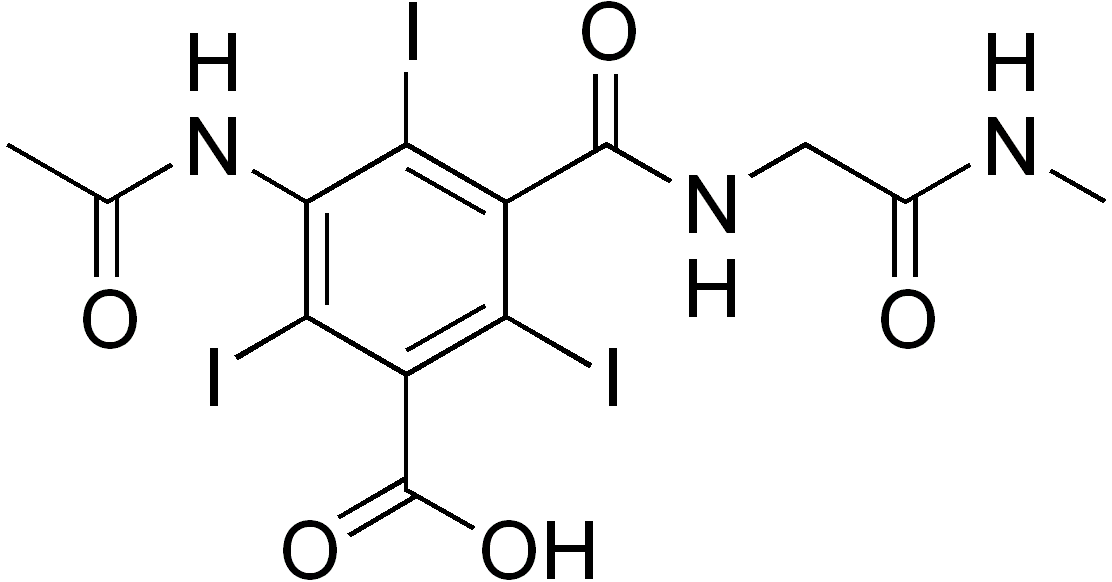

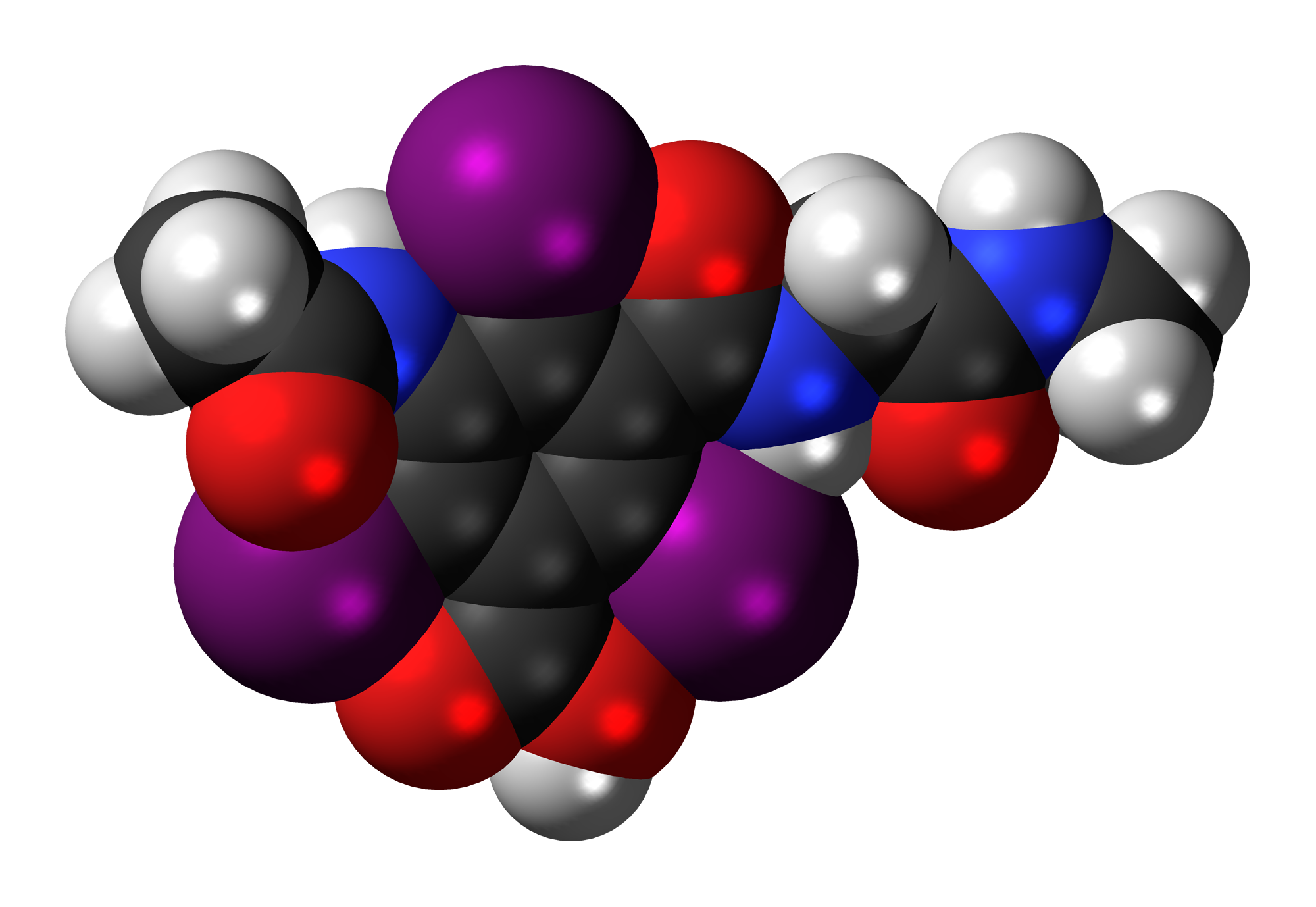

Clinical data
- ATC code: V08AA06 (WHO)

Identifiers
- IUPAC name: 3-acetamido-2,4,6-triiodo-5-{[(methylcarbamoyl)methyl]carbamoyl}benzoic acid
- CAS Number: 49755-67-1
- PubChem CID: 65437
- DrugBank: DB13701
- ChemSpider: 58900
- UNII: 3LGR5S8101
- KEGG: D04574
- ChEMBL: ChEMBL1201291
- CompTox Dashboard (EPA): DTXSID10198023
- ECHA InfoCard: 100.051.320

Chemical and physical data
- Formula: C_{13}H_{12}I_{3}N_{3}O_{5}
- Molar mass: 670.968 g·mol^{−1}
- 3D model (JSmol): Interactive image
- SMILES: Ic1c(c(I)c(c(I)c1NC(=O)C)C(=O)O)C(=O)NCC(=O)NC

Ioglicic acid is a pharmaceutical drug that was used as an iodinated contrast medium for X-ray imaging, in form of its salt meglumine ioglicate. Uses included imaging of the brain, the aorta and femoral arteries, and the urinary system (an examination called intravenous urography).

It is not known to be marketed anywhere in the world in 2021.
