= Iocarmic acid =

Chemical compound

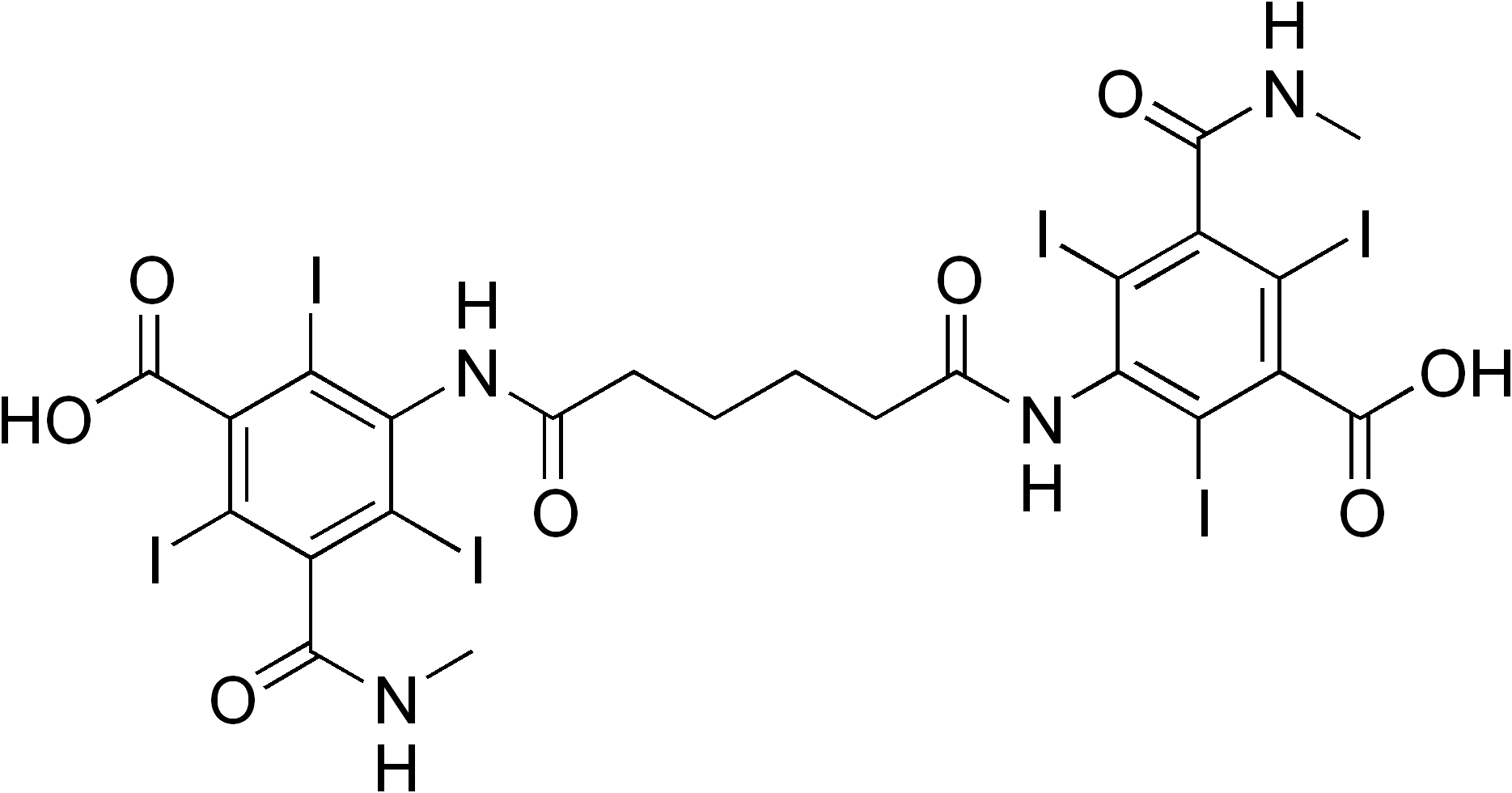

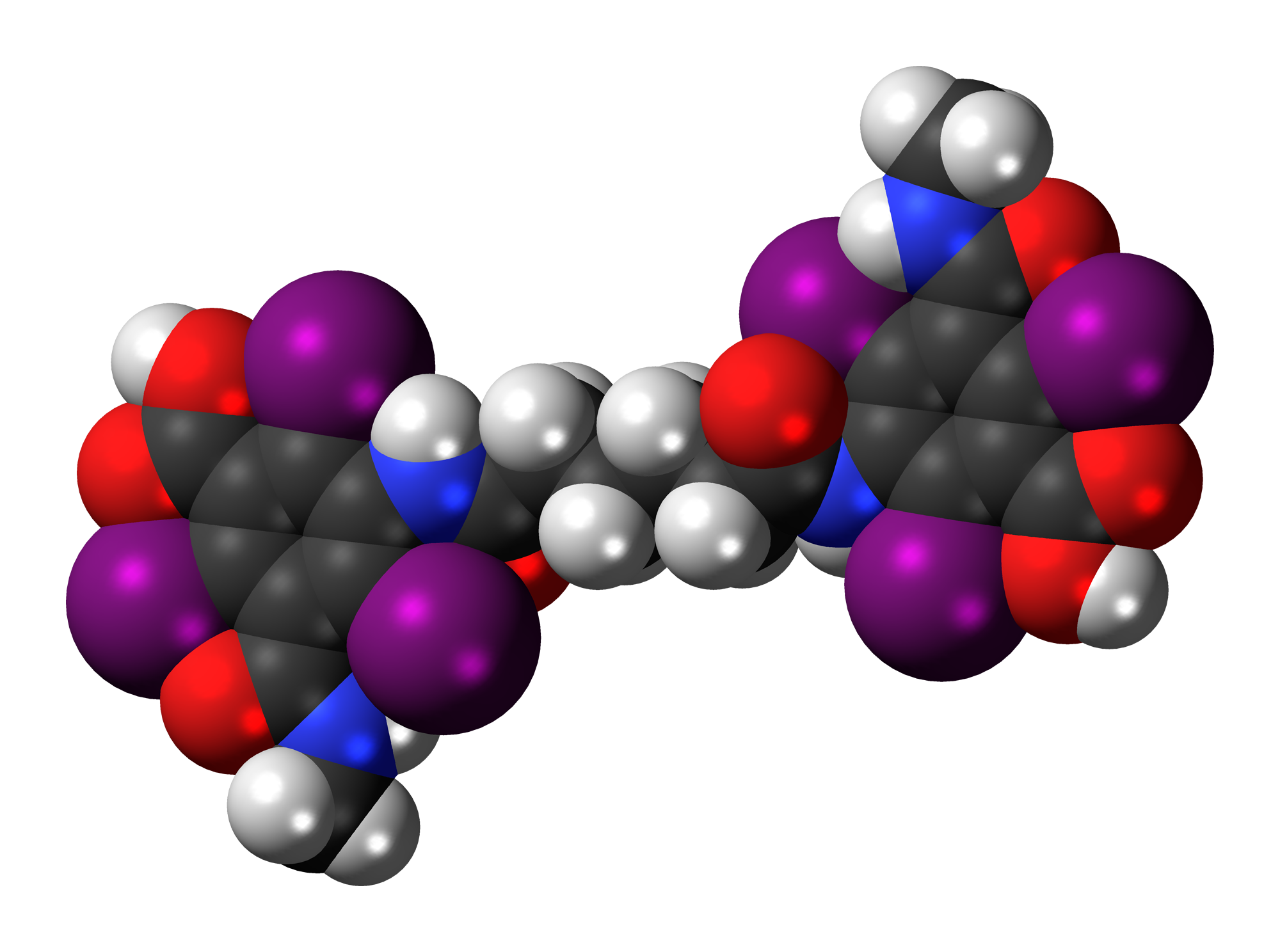

Clinical data
- Trade names: Dimer-X
- Other names: 3-[[6-[[3-Carboxy-2,4,6-triiodo-5-(methylcarbamoyl)phenyl]amino]-6-oxohexanoyl]amino]-2,4,6-triiodo-5-(methylcarbamoyl)benzoic acid
- ATC code: V08AA08 (WHO)

Identifiers
- IUPAC name: 3-(5-{[3-carboxy-2,4,6-triiodo-5-(methylcarbamoyl)phenyl]carbamoyl}pentanamido)-2,4,6-triiodo-5-(methylcarbamoyl)benzoic acid
- CAS Number: 10397-75-8
- PubChem CID: 25229
- DrugBank: DB13755
- ChemSpider: 23564
- UNII: 82PB24K6TZ
- KEGG: D01099
- CompTox Dashboard (EPA): DTXSID7023148
- ECHA InfoCard: 100.030.771

Chemical and physical data
- Formula: C_{24}H_{20}I_{6}N_{4}O_{8}
- Molar mass: 1253.871 g·mol^{−1}
- 3D model (JSmol): Interactive image
- SMILES: CNC(=O)c1c(c(c(c(c1I)NC(=O)CCCCC(=O)Nc2c(c(c(c(c2I)C(=O)O)I)C(=O)NC)I)I)C(=O)O)I
- InChI: InChI=1S/C24H20I6N4O8/c1-31-21(37)9-13(25)11(23(39)40)17(29)19(15(9)27)33-7(35)5-3-4-6-8(36)34-20-16(28)10(22(38)32-2)14(26)12(18(20)30)24(41)42/h3-6H2,1-2H3,(H,31,37)(H,32,38)(H,33,35)(H,34,36)(H,39,40)(H,41,42); Key:SMQYOVYWPWASGU-UHFFFAOYSA-N

Iocarmic acid (trade name Dimer-X) is a pharmaceutical drug used as an iodinated contrast medium for X-ray imaging in the 1970s and 80s. Uses included imaging of the uterus and fallopian tubes. It was applied in form of its salt, meglumine iocarmate.

It is not known to be marketed anywhere in the world in 2021.
