= Iotroxic acid =

Chemical compound

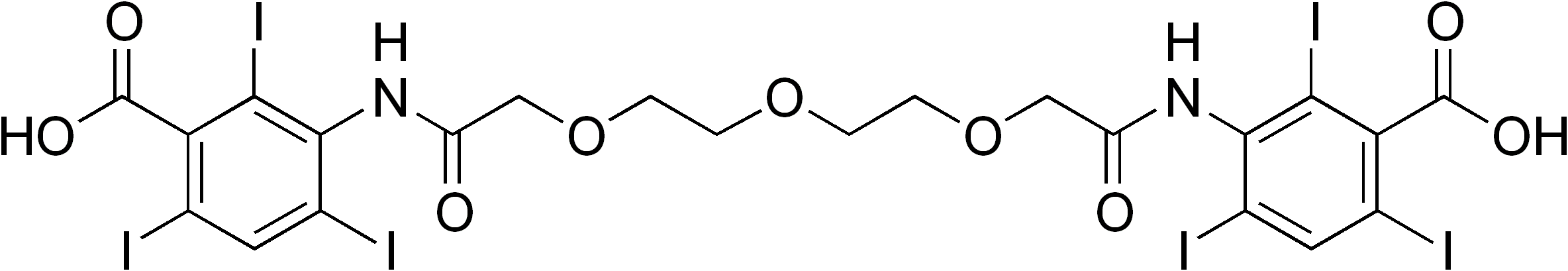

Clinical data
- Trade names: Biliscopin, others
- AHFS/Drugs.com: International Drug Names
- ATC code: V08AC02 (WHO)

Identifiers
- IUPAC name: 3-{2-[2-(2-{[(3-carboxy-2,4,6-triiodophenyl)carbamoyl]methoxy}ethoxy)ethoxy]acetamido}-2,4,6-triiodobenzoic acid
- CAS Number: 51022-74-3
- PubChem CID: 3740
- DrugBank: DB08945
- ChemSpider: 3609
- UNII: 84C5PTP9X6
- KEGG: D01388
- ChEMBL: ChEMBL1651905
- CompTox Dashboard (EPA): DTXSID3048782
- ECHA InfoCard: 100.051.726

Chemical and physical data
- Formula: C_{22}H_{18}I_{6}N_{2}O_{9}
- Molar mass: 1215.818 g·mol^{−1}
- 3D model (JSmol): Interactive image
- SMILES: O=C(Nc1c(I)c(c(I)cc1I)C(=O)O)COCCOCCOCC(=O)Nc2c(I)c(C(=O)O)c(I)cc2I

Iotroxic acid (trade name Biliscopin), used in the form of meglumine iotroxate, is a molecule used as a contrast medium during X-rays. It is specifically used during tests looking at the gallbladder and biliary tract. It is given by slow injection into a vein.

Side effects are uncommon. They include vomiting, skin flushing, headache, itchiness, and low blood pressure. Rare side effects include seizures and allergic reactions. Iotroxic acid is an iodine containing contrast media of the diionic dimer type.

Iotroxic acid was first made in 1976. It is on the World Health Organization's List of Essential Medicines. It is rarely used in the developed world due to the availability of magnetic resonance cholangiopancreatography (MRCP).
