= Gadoteridol =

Chemical compound

Clinical data
- Other names: (10-(2-(hydroxy-κO)propyl)-1,4,7,10-tetraazacyclododecane-1,4,7-triacetato(3^{−})-κN1,κN4,κN7,κN10,κO1,κO4,κO7)-gadolinium
- AHFS/Drugs.com: Micromedex Detailed Consumer Information
- Routes of administration: IV
- ATC code: V08CA04 (WHO)

Legal status
- Legal status: CA: ℞-only; US: ℞-only

Identifiers
- IUPAC name: gadolinium(+3) cation; 2-[4-(2-hydroxypropyl)-7,10-bis(2-oxido-2-oxoethyl)-1,4,7,10-tetrazacyclododec-1-yl]acetate
- CAS Number: 120066-54-8
- PubChem CID: 60714
- DrugBank: DB00597
- ChemSpider: 54719
- UNII: 0199MV609F
- KEGG: D01137
- ChEBI: CHEBI:31643
- ChEMBL: ChEMBL1200593
- CompTox Dashboard (EPA): DTXSID2048662

Chemical and physical data
- Formula: C_{17}H_{29}GdN_{4}O_{7}
- Molar mass: 558.69 g·mol^{−1}
- 3D model (JSmol): Interactive image
- SMILES: [Gd+3].[O-]C(=O)CN1CCN(CCN(CCN(CC(O)C)CC1)CC([O-])=O)CC([O-])=O
- InChI: InChI=1S/C17H32N4O7.Gd/c1-14(22)10-18-2-4-19(11-15(23)24)6-8-21(13-17(27)28)9-7-20(5-3-18)12-16(25)26;/h14,22H,2-13H2,1H3,(H,23,24)(H,25,26)(H,27,28);/q;+3/p-3; Key:DPNNNPAKRZOSMO-UHFFFAOYSA-K

Gadoteridol (INN) is a gadolinium-based MRI contrast agent, used particularly in the imaging of the central nervous system. It is sold under the brand name ProHance. Gadoteridol was first approved for use in the United States in 1992.
