= Diodone =

Chemical compound

Clinical data
- Other names: Iodopyracet, pelvirinic acid, umbradilic acid
- ATC code: V08AA10 (WHO)

Identifiers
- IUPAC name: (3,5-Diiodo-4-oxo-1(4H)-pyridinyl)acetic acid
- CAS Number: 101-29-1
- PubChem CID: 9304
- DrugBank: DB13568
- ChemSpider: 8945
- UNII: NLX9TZ649P
- KEGG: DG01178
- CompTox Dashboard (EPA): DTXSID7043794
- ECHA InfoCard: 100.002.666

Chemical and physical data
- Formula: C_{7}H_{5}I_{2}NO_{3}
- Molar mass: 404.930 g·mol^{−1}
- 3D model (JSmol): Interactive image
- SMILES: O=C(O)CN/1/C=C(/I)C(=O)C(\I)=C\1
- InChI: InChI=1S/C7H5I2NO3/c8-4-1-10(3-6(11)12)2-5(9)7(4)13/h1-2H,3H2,(H,11,12); Key:PVBALTLWZVEAIO-UHFFFAOYSA-N

Diodone is a radiocontrast agent that was used in urography. It was usually formulated as a salt with diethanolamine.

== See also ==
- Iodinated contrast
