= Ipodate sodium =

Chemical compound

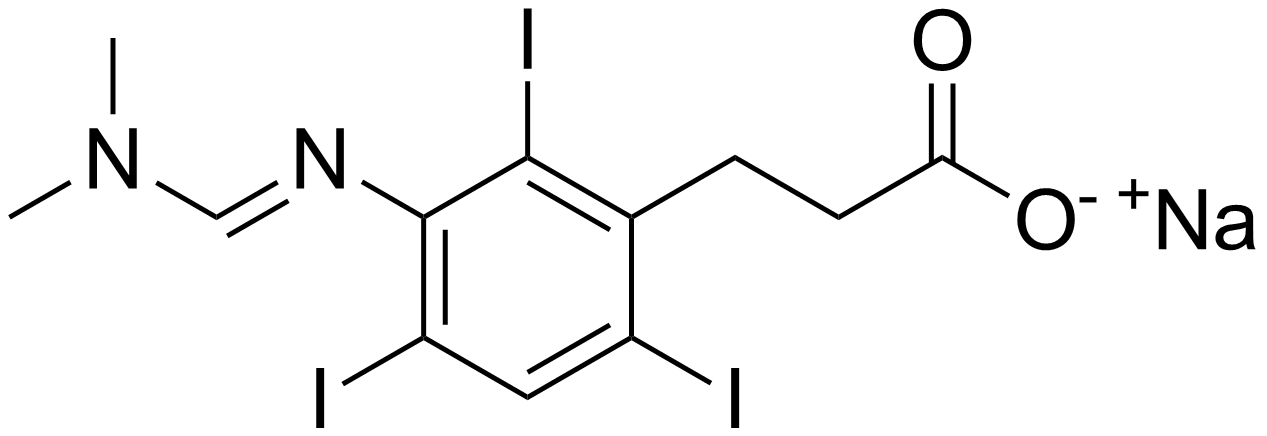

Clinical data
- Trade names: Oragrafin
- Routes of administration: oral, Intravenous
- ATC code: V08AC08 (WHO)

Identifiers
- IUPAC name: sodium 3-(3-{[(dimethylamino)methylidene]amino}-2,4,6-triiodophenyl)propanoate
- CAS Number: 5587-89-3
- PubChem CID: 14651
- ChemSpider: 13984
- UNII: F604ZKI910
- ChEMBL: ChEMBL1201033
- CompTox Dashboard (EPA): DTXSID9048271
- ECHA InfoCard: 100.013.587

Chemical and physical data
- Formula: C_{12}H_{12}I_{3}N_{2}NaO_{2}
- Molar mass: 619.943 g·mol^{−1}
- 3D model (JSmol): Interactive image
- Melting point: 168–169 °C (334–336 °F)
- SMILES: CN(C)/C=N/c1c(cc(c(c1I)CCC(=O)[O-])I)I.[Na+]
- InChI: InChI=1S/C12H13I3N2O2.Na/c1-17(2)6-16-12-9(14)5-8(13)7(11(12)15)3-4-10(18)19;/h5-6H,3-4H2,1-2H3,(H,18,19);/q;+1/p-1/b16-6+; Key:ZFHZUGUCWJVEQC-FPUQOWELSA-M

Ipodate sodium (sodium iopodate) is an iodine-containing radiopaque contrast media used for X-rays. The drug is given orally and the resulting contrast allows for easy resolution of the bile duct and gall bladder.

== Other uses ==
Although not FDA approved, ipodate sodium has been used to treat Graves' disease and thyroid storm, an extreme form of hyperthyroidism.

=== Graves' disease ===
Long-term treatment of Graves' disease with ipodate sodium (500 mg, daily) given by mouth reduced levels of T3 and T4 in the patients. This was done with minimal side effects, indicating possible clinical usefulness. Iodine uptake was also noted to return to normal within seven days, indicating control with ipodate with rapid follow up treatment with ^{131}I is feasible.

=== Thyroid storm ===
In emergency situations, ipodate can be administered for thyroid storm. As the ipodate is metabolized, it releases iodine into circulation, helping bring the T3 and T4 levels back down. Ipodate also inhibits the conversion of T4 to T3 (which is more potent). It is not considered a first-line approach, as potassium iodide and beta blockers have less potential for side-effects. Ipodate sodium lacks FDA approval for this use.
