= Adipiodone =

Chemical compound

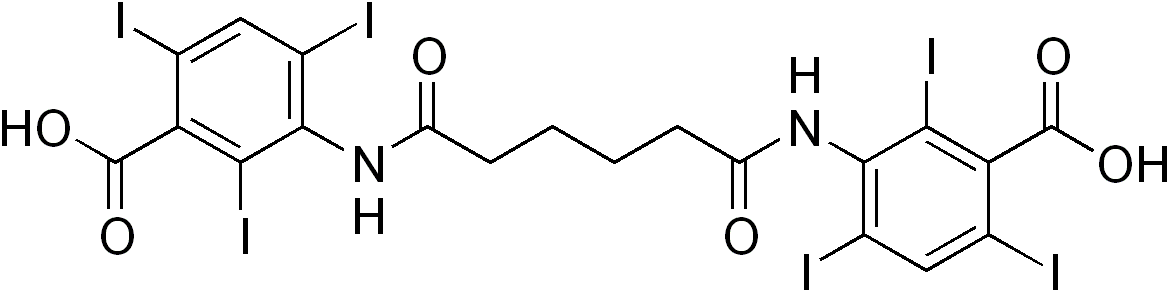

Clinical data
- Trade names: Cholografin, Biligrafin
- Other names: 3-[[6-[(3-Carboxy-2,4,6-triiodophenyl)amino]-6-oxohexanoyl]amino]-2,4,6-triiodobenzoic acid
- ATC code: V08AC04 (WHO)

Legal status
- Legal status: In general: ℞ (Prescription only)

Identifiers
- IUPAC name: 3-{5-[(3-carboxy-2,4,6-triiodophenyl)carbamoyl]pentanamido}-2,4,6-triiodobenzoic acid
- CAS Number: 606-17-7
- PubChem CID: 3739
- IUPHAR/BPS: 7400
- DrugBank: DB04711
- ChemSpider: 3608
- UNII: TKQ858A3VW
- KEGG: D01774
- ChEBI: CHEBI:31176
- ChEMBL: ChEMBL1165268
- CompTox Dashboard (EPA): DTXSID6023153
- ECHA InfoCard: 100.009.187

Chemical and physical data
- Formula: C_{20}H_{14}I_{6}N_{2}O_{6}
- Molar mass: 1139.767 g·mol^{−1}
- 3D model (JSmol): Interactive image
- SMILES: O=C(Nc1c(I)c(c(I)cc1I)C(=O)O)CCCCC(=O)Nc2c(I)c(C(=O)O)c(I)cc2I
- InChI: InChI=1S/C20H14I6N2O6/c21-7-5-9(23)17(15(25)13(7)19(31)32)27-11(29)3-1-2-4-12(30)28-18-10(24)6-8(22)14(16(18)26)20(33)34/h5-6H,1-4H2,(H,27,29)(H,28,30)(H,31,32)(H,33,34); Key:FFINMCNLQNTKLU-UHFFFAOYSA-N

Adipiodone (INN, or iodipamide; trade names Cholografin and Biligrafin) is a pharmaceutical drug used as a radiocontrast agent in X-ray imaging. It was introduced in the 1950s.
