= Iopydol =

Chemical compound

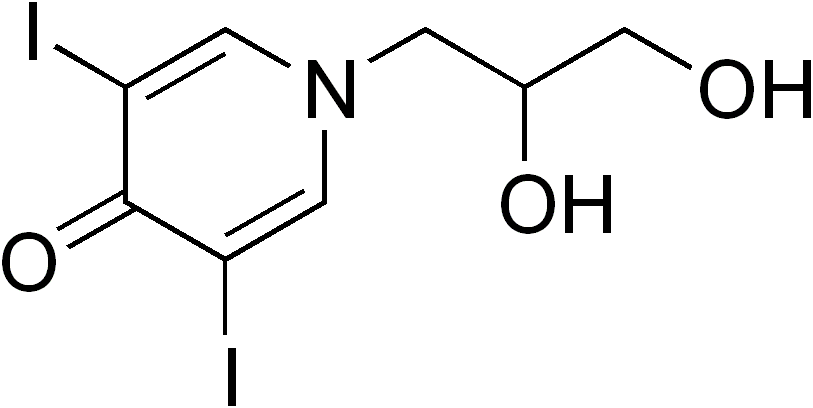

Clinical data
- ATC code: V08AD02 (WHO)

Identifiers
- IUPAC name: 1-(2,3-dihydroxypropyl)-3,5-diiodo-1,4-dihydropyridin-4-one
- CAS Number: 5579-92-0
- PubChem CID: 21751
- DrugBank: DB13389
- ChemSpider: 20443
- UNII: T4661K682A
- KEGG: D04586
- CompTox Dashboard (EPA): DTXSID90863565
- ECHA InfoCard: 100.024.517

Chemical and physical data
- Formula: C_{8}H_{9}I_{2}NO_{3}
- Molar mass: 420.973 g·mol^{−1}
- 3D model (JSmol): Interactive image
- SMILES: C1=C(C(=O)C(=CN1CC(CO)O)I)I
- InChI: InChI=1S/C8H9I2NO3/c9-6-2-11(1-5(13)4-12)3-7(10)8(6)14/h2-3,5,12-13H,1,4H2; Key:TZADDXVKYWMEHX-UHFFFAOYSA-N

Iopydol is a pharmaceutical drug used as a radiocontrast agent in X-ray imaging.

== See also ==
- Iodinated contrast
