= Metrizoic acid =

Chemical compound

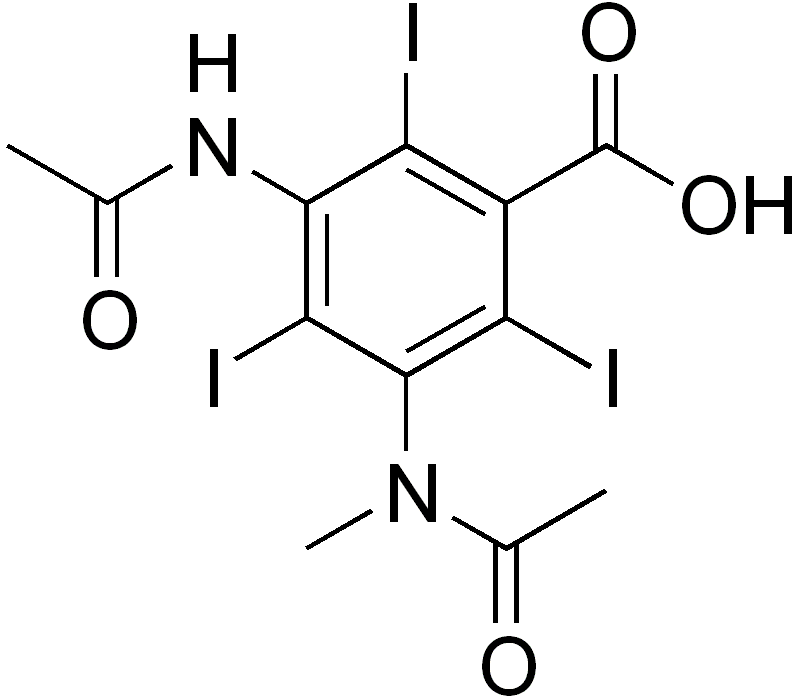

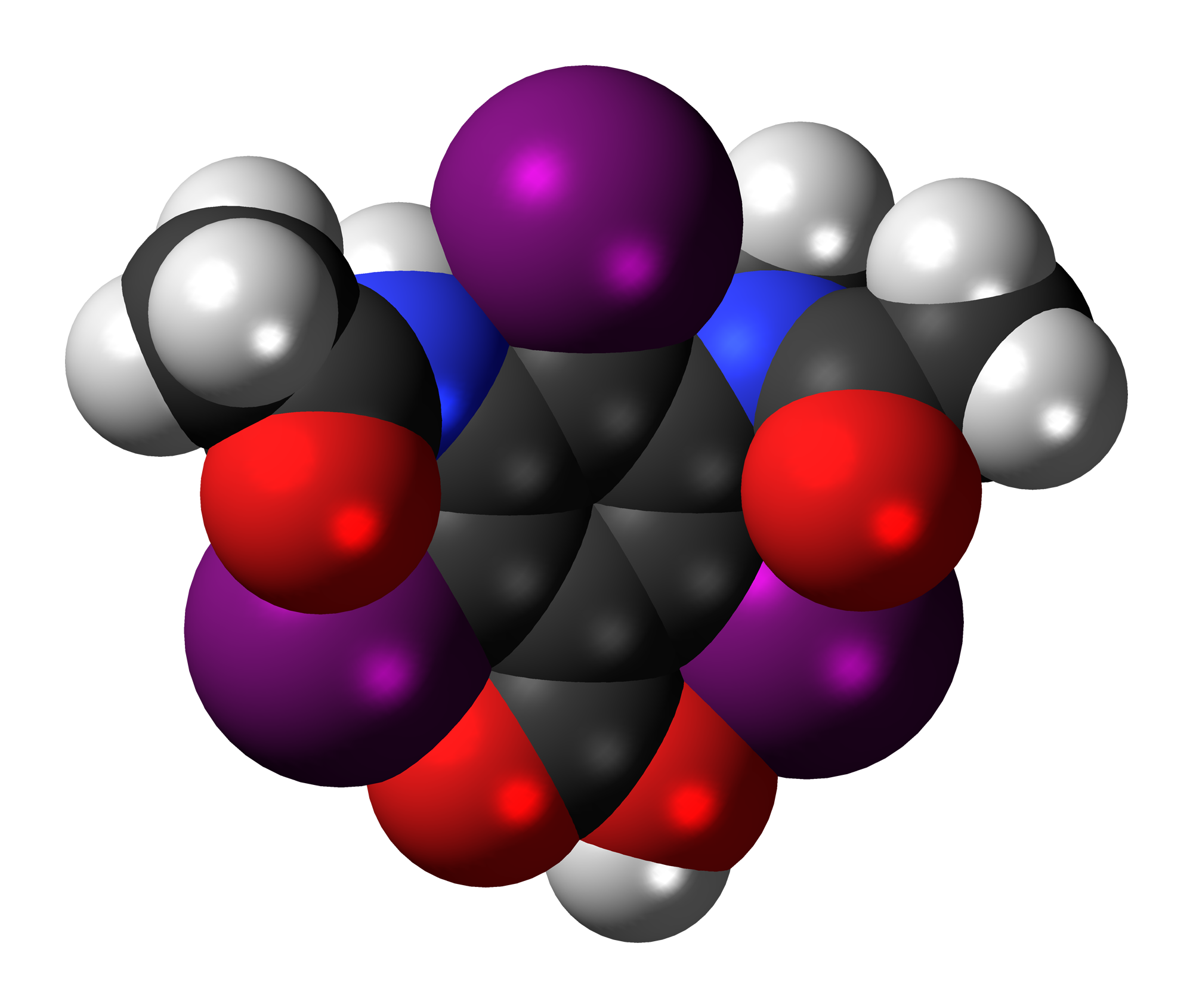

Clinical data
- ATC code: V08AA02 (WHO)

Identifiers
- IUPAC name: 3-(acetylamino)-5-[acetyl(methyl)amino]-2,4,6-triiodobenzoic acid
- CAS Number: 1949-45-7
- PubChem CID: 2528
- DrugBank: DB09346
- ChemSpider: 2433
- UNII: CM1N99QR1M
- KEGG: C14165
- ChEBI: CHEBI:34847
- ChEMBL: ChEMBL1736
- CompTox Dashboard (EPA): DTXSID6023311
- ECHA InfoCard: 100.016.147

Chemical and physical data
- Formula: C_{12}H_{11}I_{3}N_{2}O_{4}
- Molar mass: 627.943 g·mol^{−1}
- 3D model (JSmol): Interactive image
- SMILES: CC(=O)NC1=C(C(=C(C(=C1I)C(=O)O)I)N(C)C(=O)C)I
- InChI: InChI=1S/C12H11I3N2O4/c1-4(18)16-10-7(13)6(12(20)21)8(14)11(9(10)15)17(3)5(2)19/h1-3H3,(H,16,18)(H,20,21); Key:GGGDNPWHMNJRFN-UHFFFAOYSA-N

Metrizoic acid is a pharmaceutical drug that was used as an iodinated contrast medium for X-ray imaging. Its uses included angiography (imaging of blood vessels and heart chambers) and urography (imaging of the urinary tract), but its approval for use has been discontinued in the United States by the FDA.

It was used in form of its salts, metrizoates. Due to its high osmolality, metrizoic acid had a risk of inducing allergic reactions higher than that of lower osmolar contrast media.

== Chemistry ==
The iodine content of metrizoate ranged from 370 mg/ml to 440 mg/ml, with osmolarity has high as 2100 mOsm/kg. The viscosity is 3.4 cP at 37 degree Celsius (human body temperature).

== Adverse effects ==
Side effects of metrizoate are: urticaria, headache, nausea, vomiting, dizziness, and hypotension. Other side effects include minor electrocardiographic changes such as tachycardia, bradycardia, and inversion of T waves.
