= Iofendylate =

Chemical compound

Iophendylate
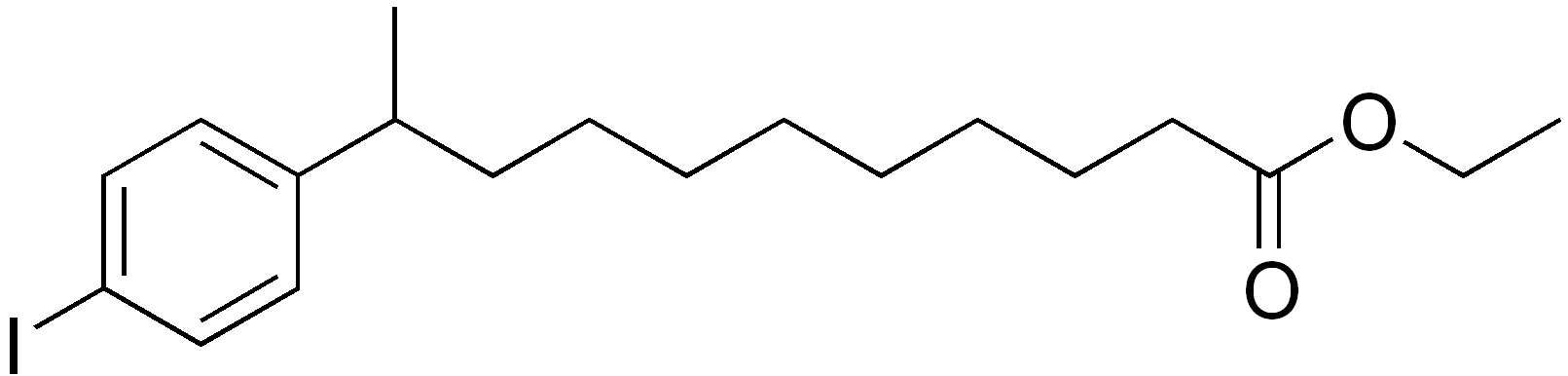

Clinical data
- Trade names: Myodil, Pantopaque
- ATC code: V08AD04 (WHO)

Identifiers
- IUPAC name: ethyl 10-(4-iodophenyl)undecanoate
- CAS Number: 99-79-6
- PubChem CID: 7458
- DrugBank: DB01187
- ChemSpider: 7178
- UNII: 2990I809YH
- ChEMBL: ChEMBL951
- CompTox Dashboard (EPA): DTXSID2052869
- ECHA InfoCard: 100.002.534

Chemical and physical data
- Formula: C_{19}H_{29}IO_{2}
- Molar mass: 416.343 g·mol^{−1}
- 3D model (JSmol): Interactive image
- SMILES: CCOC(=O)CCCCCCCCC(C)C1=CC=C(C=C1)I
- InChI: InChI=1S/C19H29IO2/c1-3-22-19(21)11-9-7-5-4-6-8-10-16(2)17-12-14-18(20)15-13-17/h12-16H,3-11H2,1-2H3; Key:LAYLQVBQIBQVLL-UHFFFAOYSA-N

Iofendylate is a molecule that was used yesteryear as a radiocontrast agent, typically for performing myelography studies. It was marketed under the trade names Pantopaque (in North America) and Myodil (rest of the world).

Iofendylate is a highly lipophilic (oily) substance and as such it was recommended that the physician remove it from the patient at the end of the myelography procedure, which was a difficult and painful part of the said procedure. Moreover, because complete removal could not always be achieved (or even attempted by some physicians), iofendylate's persistence in the body might sometimes lead to arachnoiditis, a potentially painful and debilitating lifelong disorder of the backbone. As a result, the substance, which was used extensively for over three decades, became the subject of multiple lawsuits filed around the world.

Iofendylate's use ended when water-soluble agents suitable for spinal imaging (such as metrizamide) became available in the late 1970s. With those substances it was no longer necessary to manually remove the contrast agent as it would normally be cleared by the body on its own. Also, with the advent of MRI, myelography studies are nowadays much less-frequently performed.
