= Ioxilan =

Chemical compound

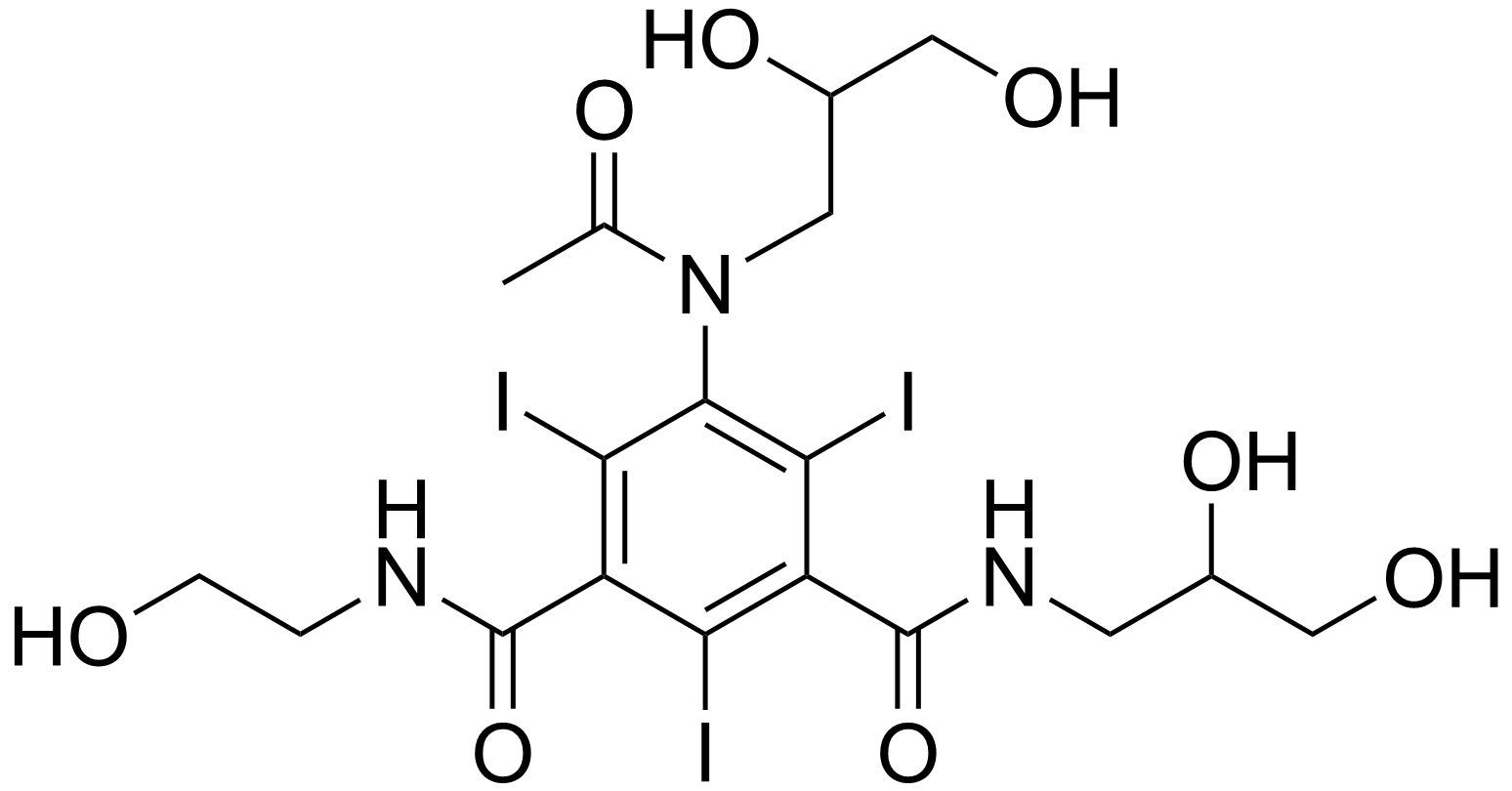

Clinical data
- Trade names: Oxilan
- AHFS/Drugs.com: FDA Professional Drug Information
- Routes of administration: intravenously
- ATC code: V08AB12 (WHO)

Legal status
- Legal status: US: ℞-only; Discontinued

Pharmacokinetic data
- Bioavailability: N/A
- Protein binding: negligible
- Metabolism: none
- Elimination half-life: 2 hours
- Excretion: Mostly renal

Identifiers
- IUPAC name: 1-N-(2,3-dihydroxypropyl)-5-[N-(2,3-dihydroxypropyl)acetamido]-3-N-(2-hydroxyethyl)-2,4,6-triiodobenzene-1,3-dicarboxamide
- CAS Number: 107793-72-6
- PubChem CID: 3743
- DrugBank: DB09135
- ChemSpider: 3612
- UNII: A4YJ7J11TG
- KEGG: D02161
- ChEMBL: ChEMBL1201075
- CompTox Dashboard (EPA): DTXSID0048717

Chemical and physical data
- Formula: C_{18}H_{24}I_{3}N_{3}O_{8}
- Molar mass: 791.116 g·mol^{−1}
- 3D model (JSmol): Interactive image
- SMILES: O=C(N(c1c(I)c(c(I)c(c1I)C(=O)NCCO)C(=O)NCC(O)CO)CC(O)CO)C
- InChI: InChI=1S/C18H24I3N3O8/c1-8(28)24(5-10(30)7-27)16-14(20)11(17(31)22-2-3-25)13(19)12(15(16)21)18(32)23-4-9(29)6-26/h9-10,25-27,29-30H,2-7H2,1H3,(H,22,31)(H,23,32); Key:UUMLTINZBQPNGF-UHFFFAOYSA-N

Ioxilan is a diagnostic contrast agent. It is injected intravenously before taking X-ray images to increase arterial contrast in the final image. It was marketed in the US under the trade name Oxilan by Guerbet, L.L.C., but was discontinued in 2017.

== Mechanism of action ==
Ioxilan is an iodinated contrast agent.
