= Ioglycamic acid =

Chemical compound

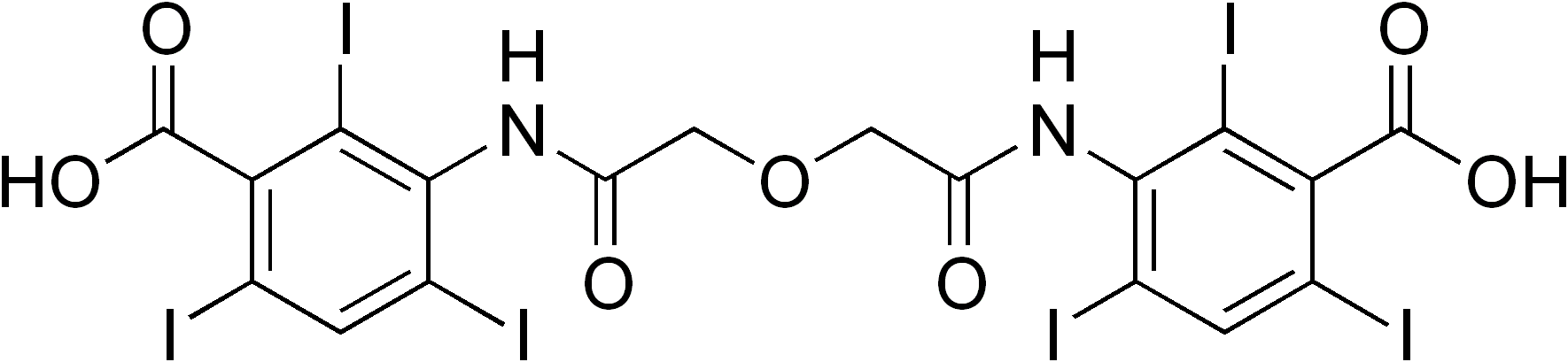

Clinical data
- Trade names: Biligram
- ATC code: V08AC03 (WHO)

Identifiers
- IUPAC name: 3-(2-{[(3-carboxy-2,4,6-triiodophenyl)carbamoyl]methoxy}acetamido)-2,4,6-triiodobenzoic acid
- CAS Number: 2618-25-9
- PubChem CID: 17477
- DrugBank: DB13741
- ChemSpider: 16526
- UNII: ET36GPP4T7
- ChEMBL: ChEMBL2106372
- CompTox Dashboard (EPA): DTXSID50180801
- ECHA InfoCard: 100.018.227

Chemical and physical data
- Formula: C_{18}H_{10}I_{6}N_{2}O_{7}
- Molar mass: 1127.712 g·mol^{−1}
- 3D model (JSmol): Interactive image
- SMILES: O=C(Nc1c(I)c(c(I)cc1I)C(=O)O)COCC(=O)Nc2c(I)c(C(=O)O)c(I)cc2I

Ioglycamic acid (trade name Biligram) is a pharmaceutical drug that was used as an iodinated contrast medium for X-ray imaging of the gall bladder.
