= Iobenzamic acid =

Chemical compound

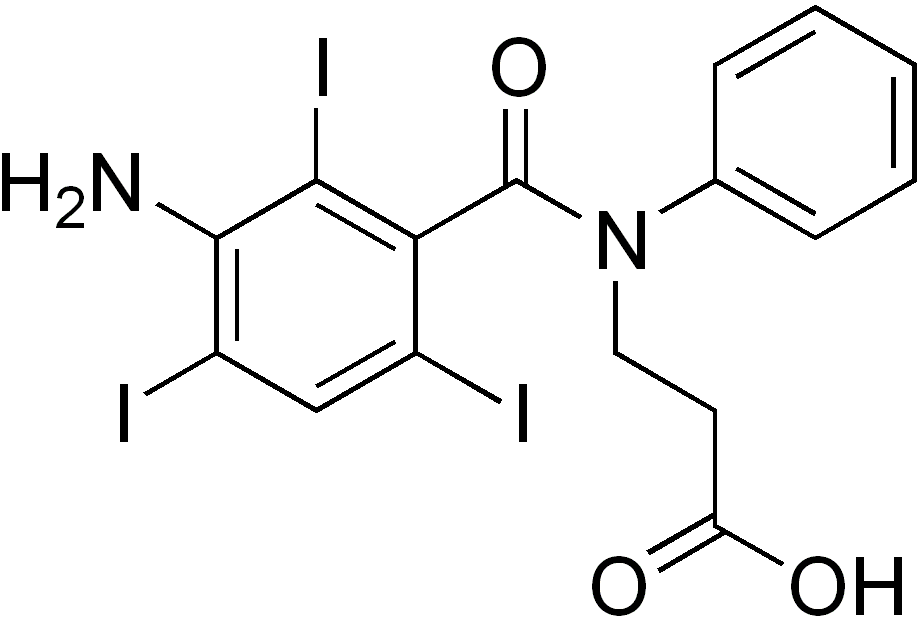

Clinical data
- ATC code: V08AC05 (WHO)

Identifiers
- IUPAC name: 3-[1-(3-amino-2,4,6-triiodophenyl)-N-phenylformamido]propanoic acid
- CAS Number: 3115-05-7
- PubChem CID: 18377
- DrugBank: DB13428
- ChemSpider: 17355
- UNII: F72UWG2SWK
- KEGG: D01313
- CompTox Dashboard (EPA): DTXSID9057711
- ECHA InfoCard: 100.019.531

Chemical and physical data
- Formula: C_{16}H_{13}I_{3}N_{2}O_{3}
- Molar mass: 662.004 g·mol^{−1}
- 3D model (JSmol): Interactive image
- SMILES: Ic1c(c(I)c(N)c(I)c1)C(=O)N(c2ccccc2)CCC(=O)O
- InChI: InChI=1S/C16H13I3N2O3/c17-10-8-11(18)15(20)14(19)13(10)16(24)21(7-6-12(22)23)9-4-2-1-3-5-9/h1-5,8H,6-7,20H2,(H,22,23); Key:FJYJNLIEGUTPIJ-UHFFFAOYSA-N

Iobenzamic acid is a pharmaceutical drug used as an X-ray contrast agent.

It is a water-soluble, hepatotropic contrast medium, meaning it is taken up by the liver and gallbladder. This makes it useful for imaging these organs.

== See also ==
- Iodinated contrast
