= Iocetamic acid =

Chemical compound

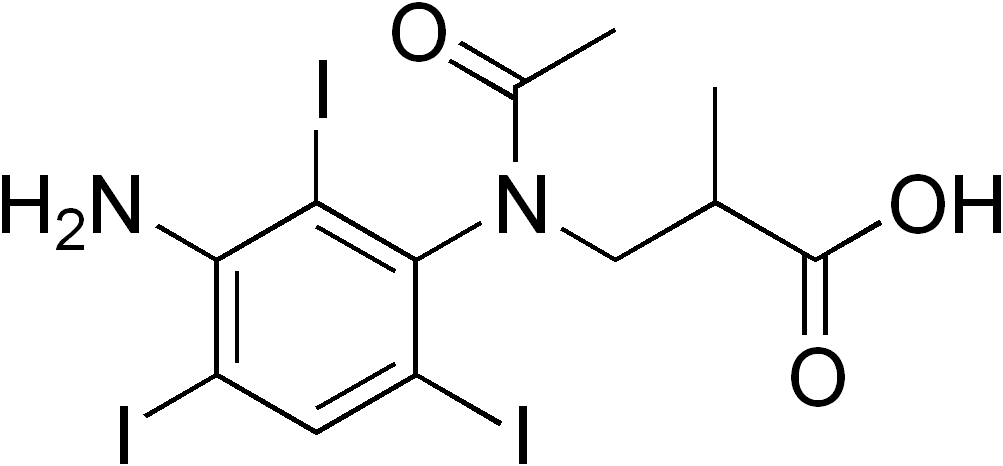

Clinical data
- Trade names: Cholebrin
- Routes of administration: By mouth
- ATC code: V08AC07 (WHO)

Identifiers
- IUPAC name: 3-[N-(3-amino-2,4,6-triiodophenyl)acetamido]-2-methylpropanoic acid
- CAS Number: 16034-77-8
- PubChem CID: 27648
- DrugBank: DB09403
- ChemSpider: 25724
- UNII: FA675Q0E3E
- KEGG: D04563
- ChEMBL: ChEMBL1200770
- CompTox Dashboard (EPA): DTXSID2023149
- ECHA InfoCard: 100.036.505

Chemical and physical data
- Formula: C_{12}H_{13}I_{3}N_{2}O_{3}
- Molar mass: 613.960 g·mol^{−1}
- 3D model (JSmol): Interactive image
- SMILES: O=C(O)C(CN(C(=O)C)c1c(I)cc(I)c(c1I)N)C

Iocetamic acid (trade name Cholebrin) is a pharmaceutical drug taken by mouth and used as an iodinated contrast medium for X-ray imaging of the gall bladder.

It is not known to be marketed anywhere in the world in 2021.
