= Iopentol =

Chemical compound

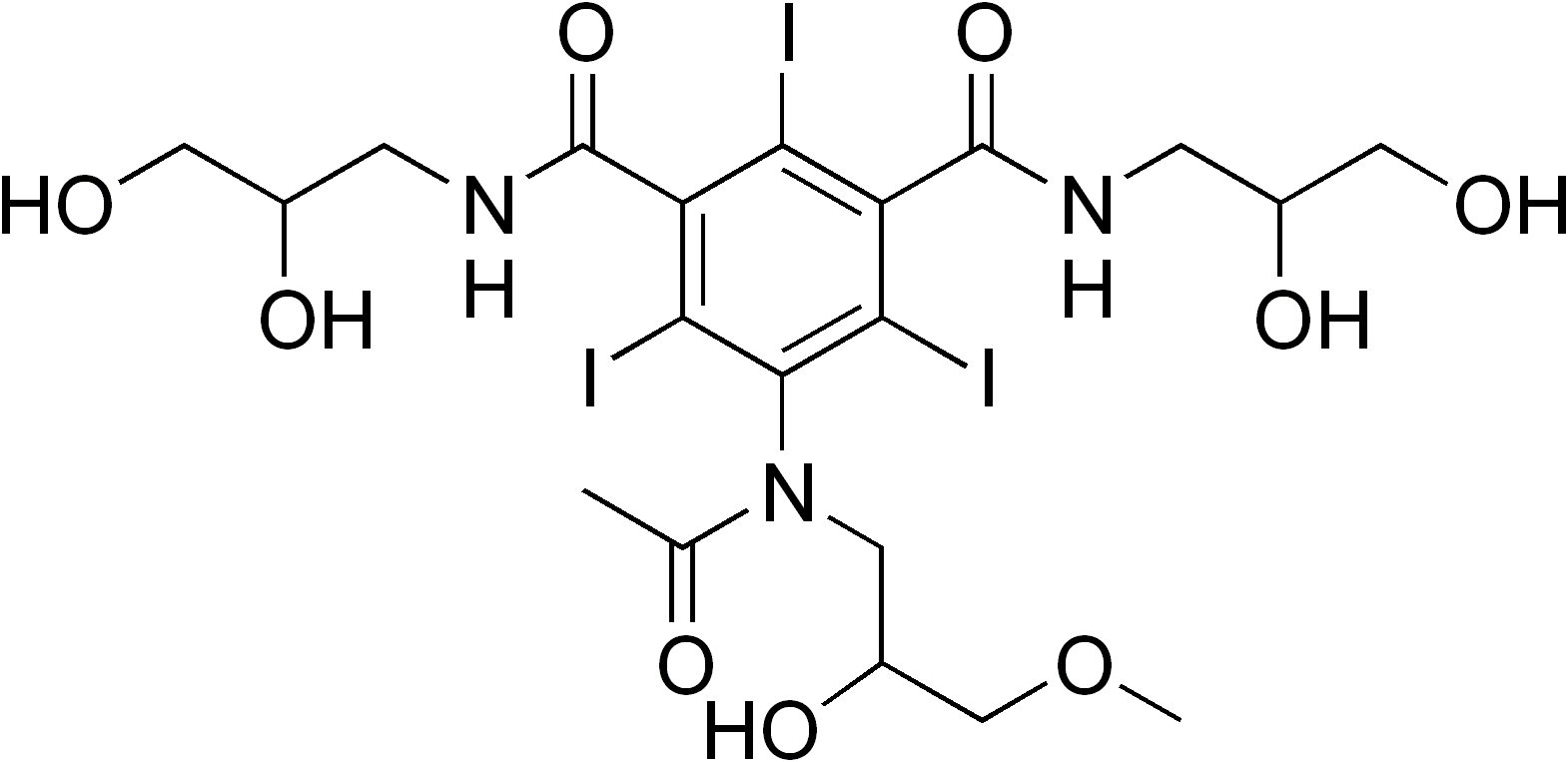

Clinical data
- Trade names: Imagopaque
- Routes of administration: Intravenous, by mouth, injection into body cavities
- ATC code: V08AB08 (WHO)

Legal status
- Legal status: Withdrawn

Pharmacokinetic data
- Protein binding: Low
- Metabolism: None
- Elimination half-life: 2 hrs (intravenous)
- Excretion: 98% via kidneys

Identifiers
- IUPAC name: 1-N,3-N-bis(2,3-dihydroxypropyl)-5-[N-(2-hydroxy-3-methoxypropyl)acetamido]-2,4,6-triiodobenzene-1,3-dicarboxamide
- CAS Number: 89797-00-2
- PubChem CID: 56016
- DrugBank: DB13861
- ChemSpider: 50573
- UNII: 7D6XWX076T
- KEGG: D04582
- ChEMBL: ChEMBL2104783
- CompTox Dashboard (EPA): DTXSID40869032

Chemical and physical data
- Formula: C_{20}H_{28}I_{3}N_{3}O_{9}
- Molar mass: 835.169 g·mol^{−1}
- 3D model (JSmol): Interactive image
- SMILES: CC(=O)N(CC(COC)O)c1c(c(c(c(c1I)C(=O)NCC(CO)O)I)C(=O)NCC(CO)O)I
- InChI: InChI=1S/C20H28I3N3O9/c1-9(29)26(5-12(32)8-35-2)18-16(22)13(19(33)24-3-10(30)6-27)15(21)14(17(18)23)20(34)25-4-11(31)7-28/h10-12,27-28,30-32H,3-8H2,1-2H3,(H,24,33)(H,25,34); Key:IUNJANQVIJDFTQ-UHFFFAOYSA-N

Iopentol (trade name Imagopaque) is a pharmaceutical drug that was used as a radiocontrast agent for X-ray imaging in Europe.

== Medical uses ==
Uses included arteriography (imaging of arteries), venography (imaging of the veins) and CT scan enhancement, urography (imaging of the urinary system), arthrography (imaging of the joints), endoscopic retrograde cholangiopancreatography (ERCP; imaging of bile and pancreatic duct), hysterosalpingography (imaging of the uterus and fallopian tubes), and gastrointestinal studies.

It can be injected into blood vessels or body cavities or given by mouth.

== Contraindications ==
Hysterosalpingography is contraindicated during acute inflammation in the pelvic region.

== Adverse effects ==
Adverse effects include nausea, vomiting, headache, as well as low or high blood pressure or heart rate. Allergy-like reactions such as rashes are usually mild; glottal edema, shock and cardiac arrest are rare.

== Interactions ==
Iodine-131, a radioactive isotope used for thyroid imaging (scintigraphy) and therapy of thyroid cancers, can be less effective when used within two to six weeks after application of iopentol because of residual iodine in the body.

== Pharmacology ==
=== Chemistry and mechanism of action ===
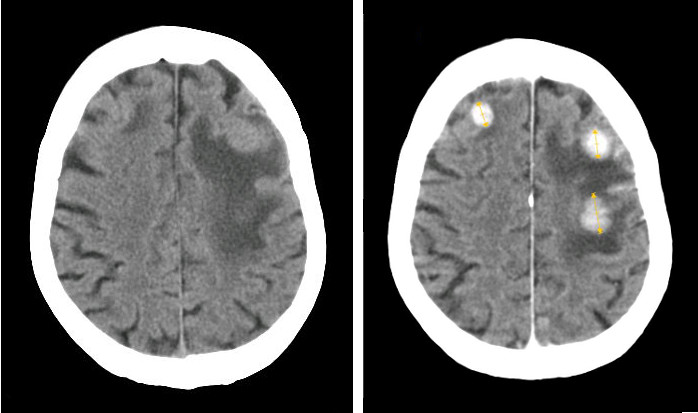
Contrast CT of a patient with brain metastases from breast cancer, before (left) and after (right) injection of an iodine-containing contrast agent

Iopentol is an iodine-containing, water-soluble radiocontrast agent. The iodine atoms readily absorb X-rays, resulting in a higher contrast of X-ray images. It has a low osmolality, meaning that the solution has a relatively low concentration of molecules; this is usually associated with fewer adverse effects than high-osmolality contrast agents.

A phase III clinical trial concluded that iopentol produces images of a similarly high quality as iohexol, and that it is equally well tolerated by patients.

=== Pharmacokinetics ===
After intravenous injection, iopentol is distributed in the extracellular space. Its binding to plasma proteins is very low. The substance is not metabolized, but excreted in unchanged form via the kidneys, exclusively by glomerular filtration. Only 2% are excreted in the faeces. The biological half-life is two hours.
