= Iotrolan =

Chemical compound

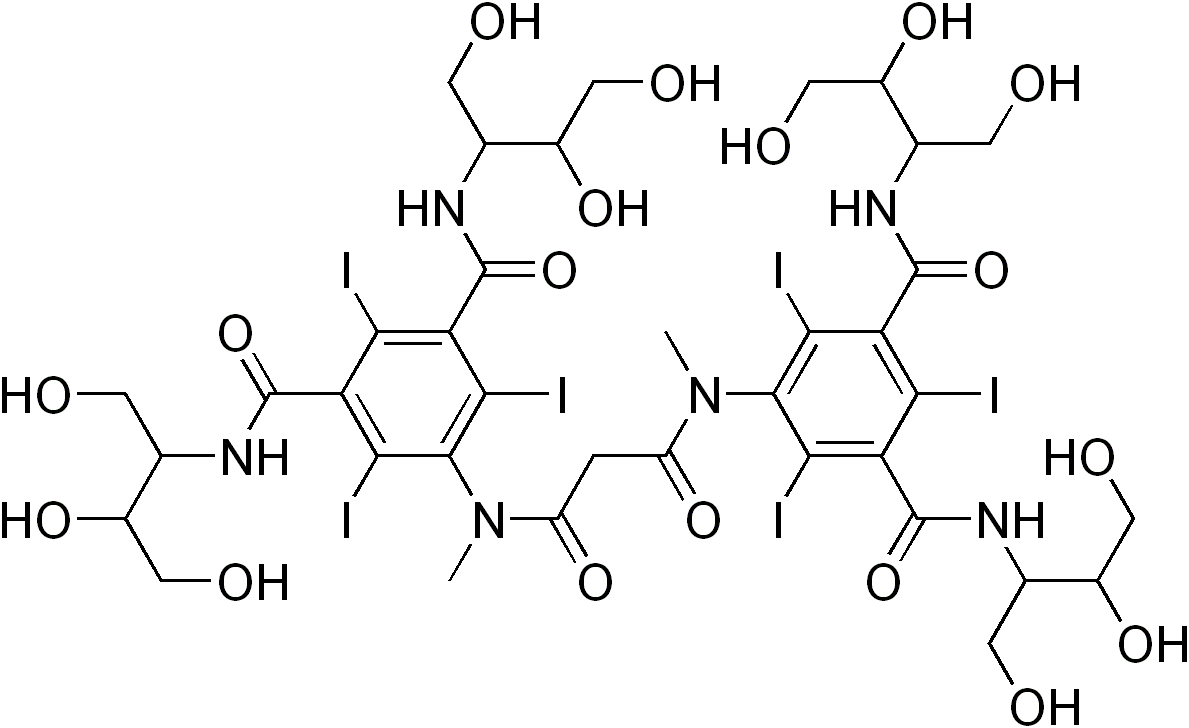

Clinical data
- Trade names: Isovist
- AHFS/Drugs.com: International Drug Names
- Pregnancy category: Contraindicated
- ATC code: V08AB06 (WHO)

Legal status
- Legal status: In general: ℞ (Prescription only)

Pharmacokinetic data
- Protein binding: Negligible
- Excretion: 99% via kidneys

Identifiers
- IUPAC name: 2,4,6-triiodo-5-{N-methyl-2-[methyl({2,4,6-triiodo-3,5-bis[(1,3,4-trihydroxybutan-2-yl)carbamoyl]phenyl})carbamoyl]acetamido}-1-N,3-N-bis(1,3,4-trihydroxybutan-2-yl)benzene-1,3-dicarboxamide
- CAS Number: 79770-24-4
- PubChem CID: 3738
- ChemSpider: 3607
- UNII: 16FL47B687
- KEGG: D01714
- ChEMBL: ChEMBL1200555
- CompTox Dashboard (EPA): DTXSID0023165

Chemical and physical data
- Formula: C_{37}H_{48}I_{6}N_{6}O_{18}
- Molar mass: 1626.242 g·mol^{−1}
- 3D model (JSmol): Interactive image
- SMILES: CN(c1c(c(c(c(c1I)C(=O)NC(CO)C(CO)O)I)C(=O)NC(CO)C(CO)O)I)C(=O)CC(=O)N(C)c2c(c(c(c(c2I)C(=O)NC(CO)C(CO)O)I)C(=O)NC(CO)C(CO)O)I
- InChI: InChI=1S/C37H48I6N6O18/c1-48(32-28(40)22(34(64)44-12(4-50)16(58)8-54)26(38)23(29(32)41)35(65)45-13(5-51)17(59)9-55)20(62)3-21(63)49(2)33-30(42)24(36(66)46-14(6-52)18(60)10-56)27(39)25(31(33)43)37(67)47-15(7-53)19(61)11-57/h12-19,50-61H,3-11H2,1-2H3,(H,44,64)(H,45,65)(H,46,66)(H,47,67); Key:XUHXFSYUBXNTHU-UHFFFAOYSA-N

Iotrolan (trade name Isovist) is an iodine-containing radiocontrast agent, a substance used to improve the visibility of body structures on images obtained by X-ray techniques.

As of 2021, it is unknown whether it is still marketed anywhere in the world.

== Medical uses ==
It is particularly used to image spaces surrounding the central nervous system, such as the ventricles, after injection into the cerebrospinal fluid; and also for angiography (imaging of blood vessels), urography (imaging of the urinary tract) and hysterosalpingography (imaging of uterus and fallopian tubes). It can also be used to image joint spaces and in endoscopic retrograde cholangiopancreatography (ERCP).

== Contraindications ==
Hysterosalpingography is contraindicated during pregnancy and during acute inflammation in the pelvic region.

== Adverse effects ==
The most common side effects are nausea and vomiting. Redness and a hot feeling of the skin is relatively common when the medication is injected into a vein. When injected into the cerebrospinal fluid, headache is among the most common adverse effects, and sometimes confusion or hallucinations can occur. Allergy-like reactions such as fever, hypotension (low blood pressure) and shock have also been observed.

== Interactions ==
Drug interactions are similar to other iodine-containing contrast agents. Iodine-131, a radioactive isotope used for thyroid imaging (scintigraphy) and therapy of thyroid cancers, can be less effective when used within two to six weeks after application of iotrolan because of residual iodine in the body. Iotrolan can slow down the excretion of the diabetes drug metformin, potentially resulting in lactic acidosis.

== Chemistry and mechanism of action ==
Chemically, the substance is a dimer of a triiodinated isophthalic acid derivative. The iodine atoms readily absorb X-rays, improving the contrast in X-ray images of the body. It is non-ionic but water soluble.
