= Iodoxamic acid =

Chemical compound

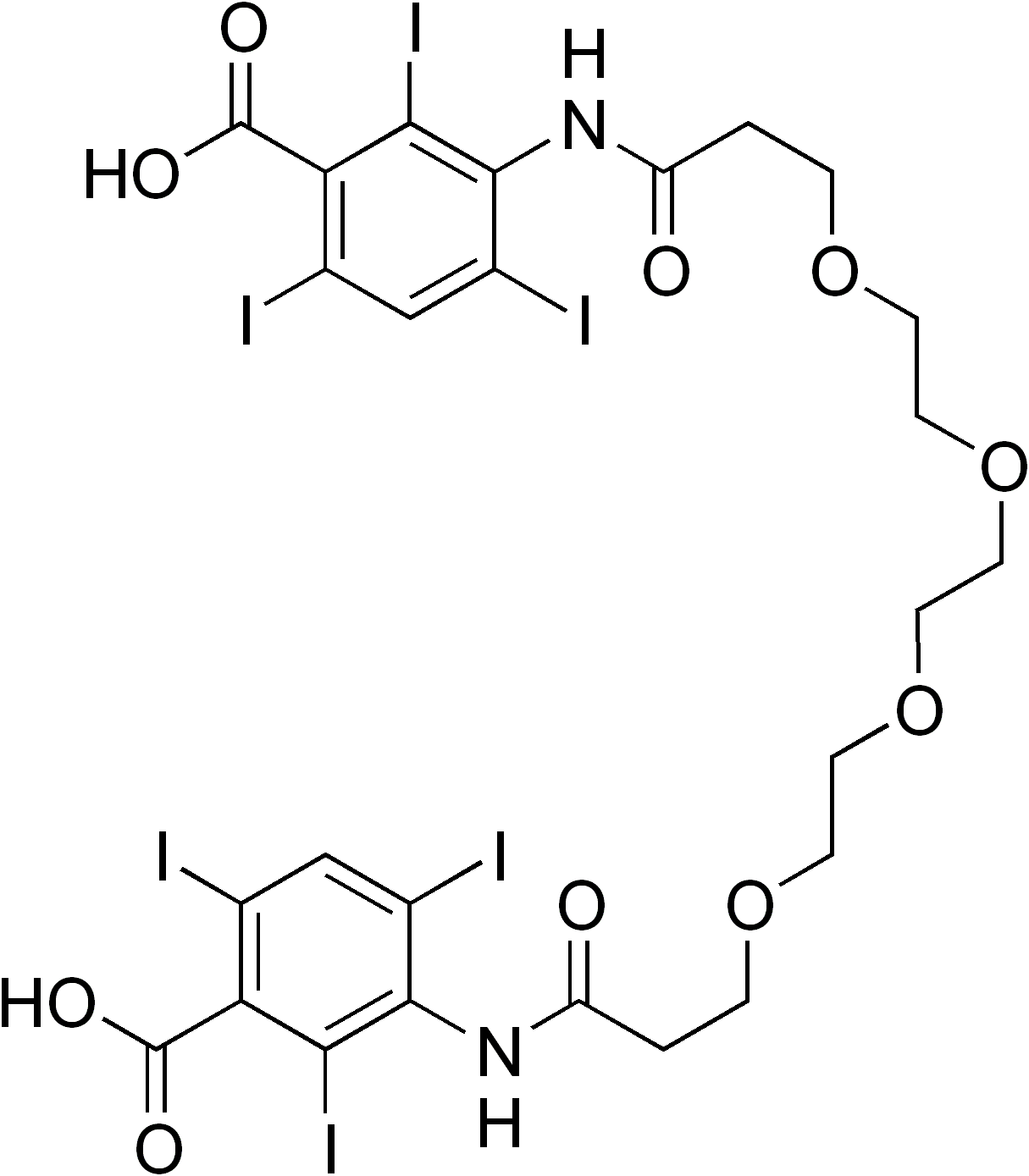

Clinical data
- Trade names: Endobil
- Other names: 3-[3-[2-[2-[2-[3-[(3-Carboxy-2,4,6-triiodophenyl)amino]-3-oxopropoxy]ethoxy]ethoxy]ethoxy]propanoylamino]-2,4,6-triiodobenzoic acid
- ATC code: V08AC01 (WHO)

Identifiers
- IUPAC name: 3-{1-[(3-carboxy-2,4,6-triiodophenyl)carbamoyl]-3,6,9,12-tetraoxapentadecan-15-amido}-2,4,6-triiodobenzoic acid
- CAS Number: 31127-82-9
- PubChem CID: 35740
- DrugBank: DB13539
- ChemSpider: 32877
- UNII: NS1Y283HW4
- KEGG: D01312
- ChEMBL: ChEMBL1201324
- CompTox Dashboard (EPA): DTXSID4057710
- ECHA InfoCard: 100.045.875

Chemical and physical data
- Formula: C_{26}H_{26}I_{6}N_{2}O_{10}
- Molar mass: 1287.925 g·mol^{−1}
- 3D model (JSmol): Interactive image
- SMILES: OC(=O)c(c1I)c(I)cc(I)c1NC(=O)CCOCCOCCOCCOCCC(=O)Nc(c2I)c(I)cc(I)c2C(=O)O

Iodoxamic acid (trade name Endobil) is an organoiodine compound used as a radiocontrast agent. It features both a high iodine content as well as several hydrophilic groups.

== See also ==
- Iodinated contrast
