= Iopanoic acid =

Chemical compound

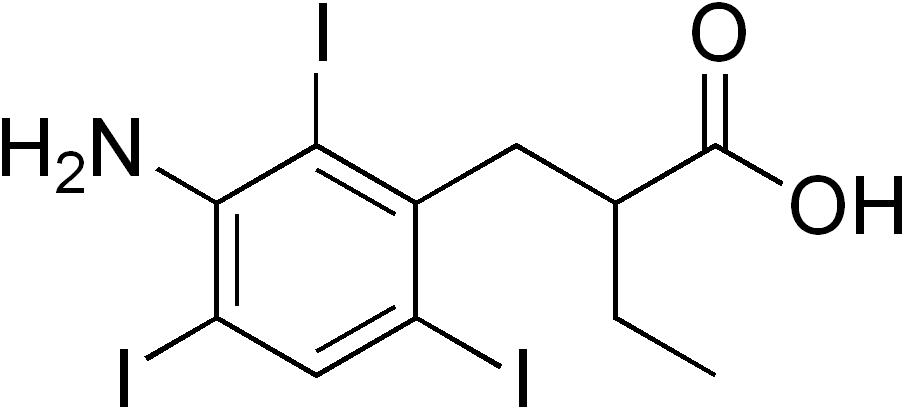

Clinical data
- AHFS/Drugs.com: Micromedex Detailed Consumer Information
- ATC code: V08AC06 (WHO)

Identifiers
- IUPAC name: (RS)-2-[(3-Amino-2,4,6-triiodophenyl)methyl]butanoic acid
- CAS Number: 96-83-3
- PubChem CID: 3735
- DrugBank: DB08946
- ChemSpider: 3604
- UNII: FE9794P71J
- KEGG: D01014
- ChEMBL: ChEMBL867
- CompTox Dashboard (EPA): DTXSID6023159
- ECHA InfoCard: 100.002.310

Chemical and physical data
- Formula: C_{11}H_{12}I_{3}NO_{2}
- Molar mass: 570.935 g·mol^{−1}
- 3D model (JSmol): Interactive image
- Melting point: 162–163 °C (324–325 °F)
- SMILES: CCC(CC1=C(C(=C(C=C1I)I)N)I)C(=O)O
- InChI: InChI=1S/C11H12I3NO2/c1-2-5(11(16)17)3-6-7(12)4-8(13)10(15)9(6)14/h4-5H,2-3,15H2,1H3,(H,16,17); Key:OIRFJRBSRORBCM-UHFFFAOYSA-N

Iopanoic acid is an iodine-containing radiocontrast medium used in cholecystography. Both iopanoic acid and ipodate sodium are potent inhibitors of thyroid hormone release from thyroid gland, as well as of peripheral conversion of thyroxine (T_{4}) to triiodothyronine (T_{3}). These compounds inhibit 5'deiodinase (5'DID-1 and 5'DID-2) enzymes, which catalyse T_{4}-T_{3} conversion in the thyroid cell, liver, kidney, skeletal muscle, heart, brain, pituitary. This accounts for the dramatic improvement in both subjective and objective symptoms of hyperthyroidism, particularly when they are used as an adjunctive therapy with thioamides (propylthiouracil, carbimazole). They can be used in the treatment of patients with severe thyrotoxicosis (thyroid storm) and significant morbidity (e.g., myocardial infarction, or stroke) for rapid control of elevated plasma triiodothyronine concentrations. The use of iopanoic acid for treatment of thyrotoxicosis has been discontinued in the United States.

In addition to inhibiting deiodinase enzymes, iopanoic acid is also a substrate of type 1 deiodinase. Iopanoic acid underwent monodeiodination in the presence of type 1 deiodinase in a microsomal mouse liver preparation.
