= Meglumine =

- Stereo, skeletal formula of meglumine

Names
- Systematic IUPAC name (2R,3R,4R,5S)-6-(Methylamino)hexane-1,2,3,4,5-pentol
- Other names N-Methyl-D-glucamine; Methylglucamine; N-Methylglucamine; 1-Deoxy-1-(methylamino)-D-glucitol; 1-Deoxy-1-methylaminosorbitol; N-Methylsorbitylamine; Meglumin

Identifiers
CAS Number	6284-40-8
3D model (JSmol)	Interactive image
ChEBI	CHEBI:59732
ChEMBL	ChEMBL1200570
ChemSpider	8249
ECHA InfoCard	100.025.916
PubChem CID	8567
UNII	6HG8UB2MUY
CompTox Dashboard (EPA)	DTXSID0023244
- InChI: InChI=1S/C7H17NO5/c1-8-2-4(10)6(12)7(13)5(11)3-9/h4-13H,2-3H2,1H3/t4-,5+,6+,7+/m0/s1 Key: MBBZMMPHUWSWHV-BDVNFPICSA-N
- SMILES: O[C@H]([C@@H](O)CNC)[C@H](O)[C@H](O)CO

Properties
Chemical formula	C_{7}H_{17}NO_{5}
Molar mass	195.215 g·mol^{−1}
Appearance	White crystals
log P	−2.509
Acidity (pK_{a})	9.52
Basicity (pK_{b})	0.526
- Except where otherwise noted, data are given for materials in their standard state (at 25 °C [77 °F], 100 kPa). verify (what is ?) Infobox references

Meglumine is a sugar alcohol derived from glucose that contains an amino group modification. It is often used as an excipient in pharmaceuticals and in conjunction with iodinated compounds in contrast media such as diatrizoate meglumine, iothalamate meglumine, and iodipamide meglumine.

== See also ==
- Flunixin meglumine
- Meglumine antimoniate
