= Cholecystography =

Radiological procedure used to visualize the gallbladder and biliary channels

- ICD-9-CM: 87.59
- MeSH: D002765

Oral cholecystography is a radiological procedure used to visualize the gallbladder and biliary channels, developed in 1924 by American surgeons Evarts Ambrose Graham and Warren Henry Cole. It is usually indicated in cases of suspected gallbladder disease, and can also be used to determine or rule out the presence of intermittent obstruction of the bile ducts or recurrent biliary disease after biliary surgery.

A radiopaque cholegraphic (contrast) agent, usually iopanoic acid (Telepaque) or its sodium or calcium salt, is orally administered, which is absorbed by the intestine. This excreted material will collect in the gallbladder, where reabsorption of water concentrates the excreted contrast. Since only 10% of gallstones are radiopaque, the remaining 90% will appear as translucent on an opaque background in an abdominal X-ray.

If needed, intravenous cholecystography and cholangiography may be done.

Current medical practice prefers ultrasound and CT over oral cholecystography.

== Interpretation ==
Failure of gallbladder visualisation during oral cholecystography when abnormal liver function returns to normal, or there is mild to moderate liver disease, maybe due to extrahepatic (outside the liver) causes. Oral cholecystography can have better sensitivity and specificity in diagnosing acute and chronic gallbladder disease than ultrasound.
