= Iodamide =

Chemical compound

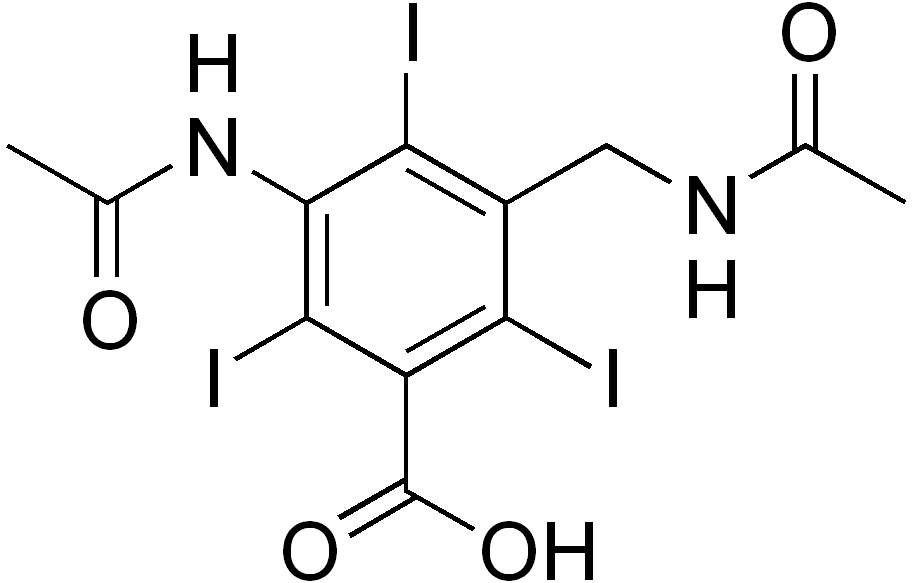

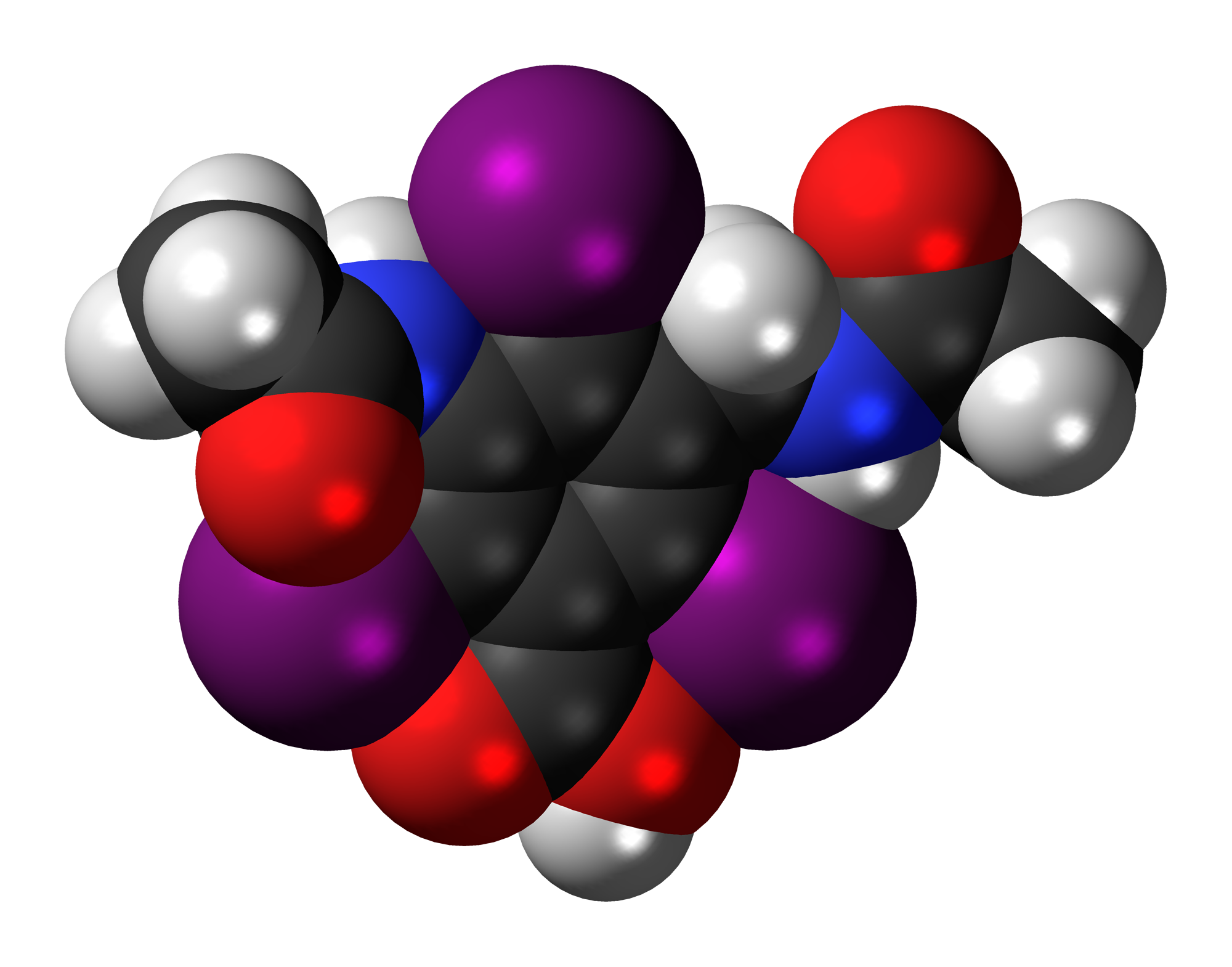

Clinical data
- Trade names: Renovue
- AHFS/Drugs.com: International Drug Names
- ATC code: V08AA03 (WHO)

Identifiers
- IUPAC name: 3-Acetamido-5-(acetamidomethyl)-2,4,6-triiodobenzoic acid
- CAS Number: 440-58-4
- PubChem CID: 3723
- DrugBank: DB08948
- ChemSpider: 3592
- UNII: 4RII332O0R
- KEGG: D01376
- ChEMBL: ChEMBL1201239
- CompTox Dashboard (EPA): DTXSID1023150
- ECHA InfoCard: 100.006.479

Chemical and physical data
- Formula: C_{12}H_{11}I_{3}N_{2}O_{4}
- Molar mass: 627.943 g·mol^{−1}
- 3D model (JSmol): Interactive image
- SMILES: CC(=O)NCC1=C(C(=C(C(=C1I)NC(=O)C)I)C(=O)O)I
- InChI: InChI=1S/C12H11I3N2O4/c1-4(18)16-3-6-8(13)7(12(20)21)10(15)11(9(6)14)17-5(2)19/h3H2,1-2H3,(H,16,18)(H,17,19)(H,20,21); Key:VVDGWALACJEJKG-UHFFFAOYSA-N

Iodamide (trade name Renovue) is a pharmaceutical drug used as an iodinated contrast medium for X-ray imaging. Its uses include imaging of the uterus and fallopian tubes.
