= Iohexol =

Chemical compound

Clinical data
- Trade names: Iodaque, Hexopaque, Oraltag, others
- Other names: 5-[N-(2,3-Dihydroxypropyl)acetamido]-2,4,6-triiodo-N,N'-bis(2,3-dihydroxypropyl)isophthalamide
- AHFS/Drugs.com: Micromedex Detailed Consumer Information
- License data: US DailyMed: Iohexol
- Routes of administration: Intrathecal, intravascular, by mouth, intracavital, rectal
- ATC code: V08AB02 (WHO)

Legal status
- Legal status: CA: ℞-only; US: ℞-only; In general: ℞ (Prescription only)

Pharmacokinetic data
- Protein binding: Low
- Metabolism: Nil
- Elimination half-life: Variable
- Excretion: Kidney, unchanged

Identifiers
- IUPAC name: 1-N,3-N-Bis(2,3-dihydroxypropyl)-5-[N-(2,3-dihydroxypropyl)acetamido]-2,4,6-triiodobenzene-1,3-dicarboxamide
- CAS Number: 66108-95-0
- PubChem CID: 3730
- DrugBank: DB01362
- ChemSpider: 3599
- UNII: 4419T9MX03
- KEGG: D01817
- ChEBI: CHEBI:31709
- ChEMBL: ChEMBL1200455
- CompTox Dashboard (EPA): DTXSID6023157
- ECHA InfoCard: 100.060.130

Chemical and physical data
- Formula: C_{19}H_{26}I_{3}N_{3}O_{9}
- Molar mass: 821.142 g·mol^{−1}
- 3D model (JSmol): Interactive image
- Melting point: 174 to 180 °C (345 to 356 °F)
- SMILES: O=C(N(c1c(I)c(c(I)c(c1I)C(=O)NCC(O)CO)C(=O)NCC(O)CO)CC(O)CO)C
- InChI: InChI=1S/C19H26I3N3O9/c1-8(29)25(4-11(32)7-28)17-15(21)12(18(33)23-2-9(30)5-26)14(20)13(16(17)22)19(34)24-3-10(31)6-27/h9-11,26-28,30-32H,2-7H2,1H3,(H,23,33)(H,24,34); Key:NTHXOOBQLCIOLC-UHFFFAOYSA-N

Iohexol, sold under the trade names Omnipaque and Iodaque among others, is a contrast agent used for X-ray imaging. This includes when visualizing arteries, veins, ventricles of the brain, the urinary system, and joints, as well as during computed tomography (CT scan). It is given by mouth, injection into a vein, or into a body cavity.

Side effects include vomiting, skin flushing, headache, itchiness, kidney problems, and low blood pressure. Less commonly allergic reactions or seizures may occur. Allergies to povidone-iodine or shellfish do not affect the risk of side effects more than other allergies. Use in the later part of pregnancy may cause hypothyroidism in the baby. Iohexol is an iodinated non-ionic radiocontrast agent. It is in the low osmolar family.

Iohexol was approved for medical use in 1985. It is on the World Health Organization's List of Essential Medicines.

== Chemistry ==
The osmolality of iohexol ranges from 322 mOsm/kg—approximately 1.1 times that of blood plasma—to 844 mOsm/kg, almost three times that of blood. Despite this difference, iohexol is still considered a low-osmolality contrast agent; the osmolality of older agents, such as diatrizoate, may be more than twice as high.

== Adverse effects ==
The most common side effects after intravenous injections are: pain at the site of injection (3%), blurring of vision (2%), nausea (2%), arrhythmia (2%), taste perversion (1%), hypotension (0.7%), and vomiting (0.7%).

== Society and culture ==
=== Naming ===
It is sold under the brand name Omnipaque. It is also sold as a density gradient medium under the names Accudenz, Histodenz, and Nycodenz.

=== Available forms ===
It is available in various concentrations, from 140 to 350 milligrams of iodine per milliliter. Iohexol can be given as intrathecal, intravascular, oral, rectal, intraarticular, or into the body cavity.
