= Contrast agent =

Substance used in medical imaging

A contrast agent (or contrast medium) is a chemical substance (or liquid formulation) used to increase the contrast of structures within the body in medical imaging. Contrast agents absorb and scatter X-ray (or ultrasound wave), or to alter electromagnetism properties of water molecules (actually water protons) in the organ or tissue, which is different from radiopharmaceuticals, which emit radiation themselves. In X-ray imaging, contrast agents enhance the radiodensity in a target tissue or structure. In magnetic resonance imaging (MRI), contrast agents shorten the relaxation times of nuclei (usually water protons) within body tissues in order to increase the contrast in the image.

Contrast agents are commonly used to improve the visibility of blood vessels, blood-rich organs or lesions, and the gastrointestinal tract.

The types of contrast agent are classified according to their intended imaging modalities, classically including CT, MRI, and Ultrasound. Nowadays in a wide sense, contrast agents can further include the chemical probes, which are administered in vivo, intended to increase image contrast for Positron Emission Tomography (PET), Near-Infrared (NIR) Imaging.

== Radiocontrast media ==
For radiography, which is based on X-rays, iodine and barium are the most common types of contrast agent. Various sorts of iodinated contrast agents exist, with variations occurring between the osmolarity, viscosity, and iodine concentration. Non-ionic dimers are favored for their low osmolarity and low toxicity, but higher viscosity, as well as having a correspondingly higher cost attached to their use.

== MRI contrast agents ==
Stable Gadolinium-based complex (between Gadolinium ion and an organic chelating molecule via coordination bonds) is used in magnetic resonance imaging as an MRI contrast agent. In the 3+ valence state, this metal ion has seven unpaired electrons, the highest number among all elements. This causes water around the contrast agent to relax quickly, enhancing the image quality of the MRI scan.

== Ultrasound contrast agents ==
Microbubbles are used as contrast agents for sonographic examination, specifically echocardiograms, for the detection of a cardiac shunt. These microbubbles are composed of agitated saline solution, most of which are too large to pass through the capillaries (blood vessels) of the lungs. Therefore, the only ones that reach the left side of the heart pass through an abnormal connection between the two sides of the heart, known as a right-to-left shunt. In addition, pharmaceutically prepared microbubbles are composed of tiny amounts of nitrogen or perfluorocarbons strengthened and supported by a protein, lipid, or polymer shell. These are small enough to pass through the capillaries and are used to increase the contrast in the left ventricle, improving the visualization of its walls. The drop in density on the interface between the gas in the bubble and the surrounding liquid strongly scatters and reflects the ultrasound back to the probe. This process of backscattering gives the liquid with these bubbles a high signal, which can be seen in the resulting image.

== See also ==
- Barium meal – Radiographs used to examine abnormalities of the digestive system excluding the colon
- Contrast-induced nephropathy
- Iodinated contrast – Substance to enhance X-ray imaging
- Ipodate sodium – Chemical compound
- Lipiodol – Medication derived from poppyseed oil and iodine often used as a contrast agent
- Medical imaging – Technique and process of creating visual representations of the interior of a body
- Radiology – Medical specialty for imaging procedures
