= Focused ultrasound-mediated diagnostics =

Diagnostic technique

Focused-ultrasound-mediated diagnostics or FUS-mediated diagnostics are an area of clinical diagnostic tools that use ultrasound to detect diseases and cancers. Although ultrasound has been used for imaging in various settings, focused-ultrasound refers to the detection of specific cells and biomarkers under flow combining ultrasound with lasers, microbubbles, and imaging techniques. Current diagnostic techniques for detecting tumors and diseases using biopsies often include invasive procedures and require improved accuracy, especially in cases such as glioblastoma and melanoma. The field of FUS-mediated diagnostics targeting cells and biomarkers is being investigated for overcoming these limitations.

FUS-mediated biopsy uses ultrasound wavelengths as low as those used for imaging to detect biomarkers in the bloodstream, referred to as in-vivo biopsies. Alternatively, studies have used FUS transducer acoustofluidic systems aiming to improve the accuracy of in-vitro cytometry methods for diagnostics of diseases from plasma samples.

== In-vivo methods ==
=== Blood–brain barrier-disruption ===
One application of FUS involves the diagnosis of glioma's. Due to the sensitive environment of the brain, open or stereotactic biopsies are not always feasible and noninvasive biopsy methods are sought for detecting glioblastoma (GBM) without the risk of inducing further injury. The use of FUS, and MRI-guided FUS specifically, in combination with microbubbles has been under investigation for enhancing diagnosis methods for those patients.

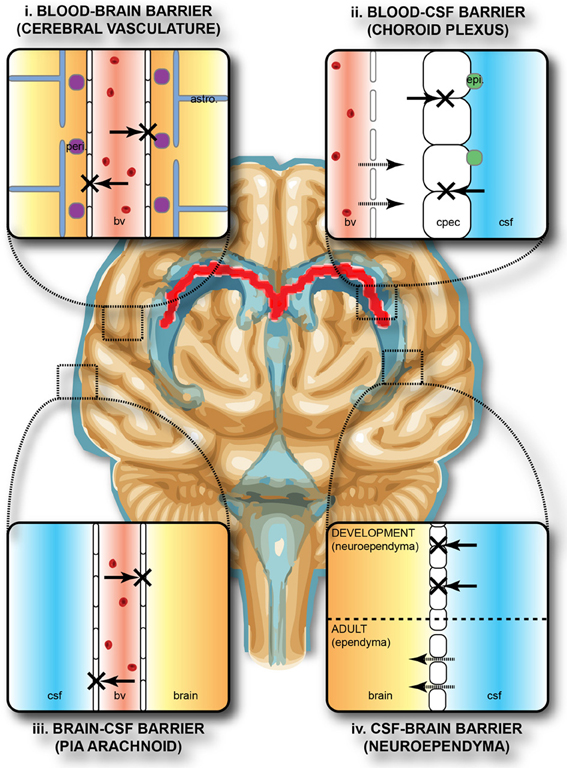
Blood brain barriers limit biomarker release and intercranial drug delivery.

Microbubbles (MB) are gas-filled membranes typically made of polymers or lipids that can induce blood-brain barrier (BBB) opening when combined with ultrasound without majorly affecting surrounding tissues. Studies have shown that when combined with microbubbles or MRI, FUS can be used to locally modulate the blood brain barrier (BBB), the main deterrent to accurate glioblastoma biomarker detection and drug delivery to the brain. When exposed to ultrasound pulses, microbubbles oscillate in size in a process called sonication which makes the brain temporarily permeable to receiving drugs or releasing biomarkers into the blood when exposed to low intensity FUS.

The use of ultrasound to facilitate blood-brain barrier disruption has been tested in animal trials including primates. Research has been focused on using this tool for improving the treatment of glioblastoma, and studies have noted that microbubble-enhanced focused-ultrasound (MB-FUS) systems can be used for drug delivery as well as diagnostics.

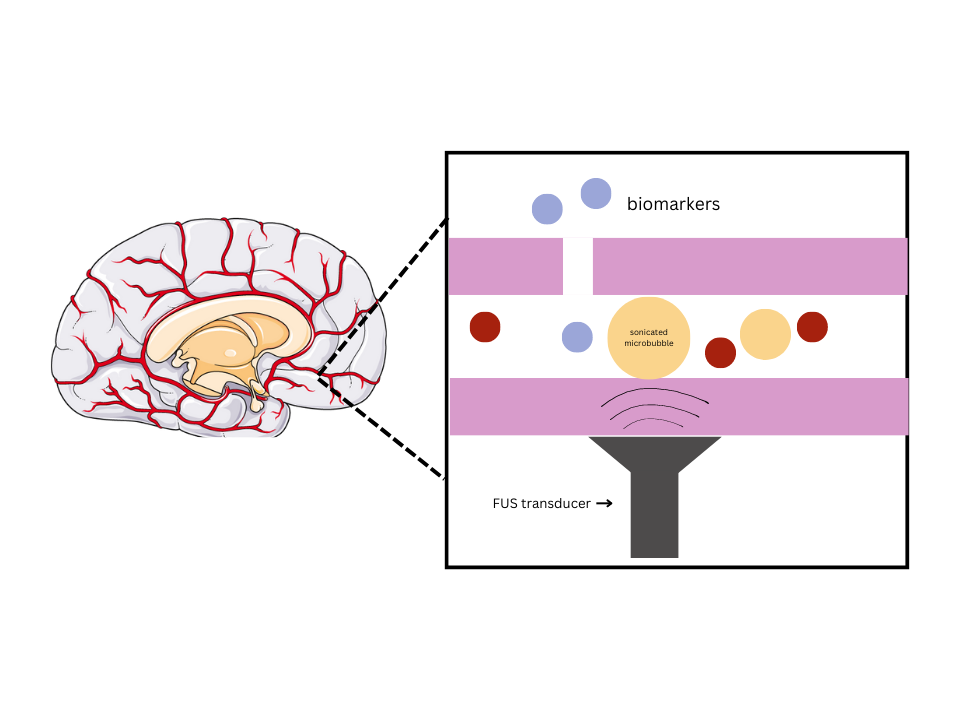
BBB disruption by focused ultrasound paired with microbubbles to release biomarkers for glioma detection.

Liquid biopsies are one of the noninvasive methods for tumor detection through checking for tumor biomarkers within the blood. However, due to the blood brain barrier (BBB), GBM tumor biomarkers cannot enter the blood at detectable levels. Researchers have aimed to use FUS and microbubbles to enhance glioblastoma detection in liquid biopsies (sonobiopsy). One technique uses MRI-guided FUS sonication of microbubbles to increase BBB permeability and allow GBM tumor biomarkers (EGFRvIII and TERT C228T) to pass the BBB and enter the plasma. This allowed for highly sensitive detection of brain tumors in mouse and pig models through liquid biopsy after BBB opening. Sonobiopsy enhanced EGFRvIII and TERT C228T detection 9-fold and 3-fold, respectively, in mice. In their developed pig GBM model, detection increased to 100% and 71.43% for EGFRvIII and TERT C228T biomarkers respectively. This study reported no significant off-target effects on the brain from sonobiopsy.

Microbubble (MB) oscillations used in these techniques can be controlled by using a secondary feedback transducer or imaging probe on a patient's head in order to prevent MB collapses. Low frequencies correspond to 200 kHz and high frequencies correspond to 650 kHz. Several models such as the INSIGHTEC have been used for clinical contexts. BBB opening and closing can be controlled by decreasing and increasing FUS pulse lengths, respectively. One of the limitations of using FUS-mediated BBB opening is possible negative effects on neuroplasticity in the brain, however, in most studies there has been no effect on parenchymal tissue reported.

=== Cytometry ===
Another area of in-vivo diagnostics uses focused ultrasound for non-invasive blood sampling. One study developed a device for "sonocytometry" which detects particle size with high intensity focused ultrasound (HIFU) under flow. A central frequency of 30 MHz can be used for an ultrasonic transducer to measure the diameter of particles in blood flow using the ultrasonic backscatter signal. Ultrasound backscatter uses the variability between acoustic impedance to differentiate between particle versus medium. Such a device is expected to have implications for anemia, leukemia, and other blood-related diseases.

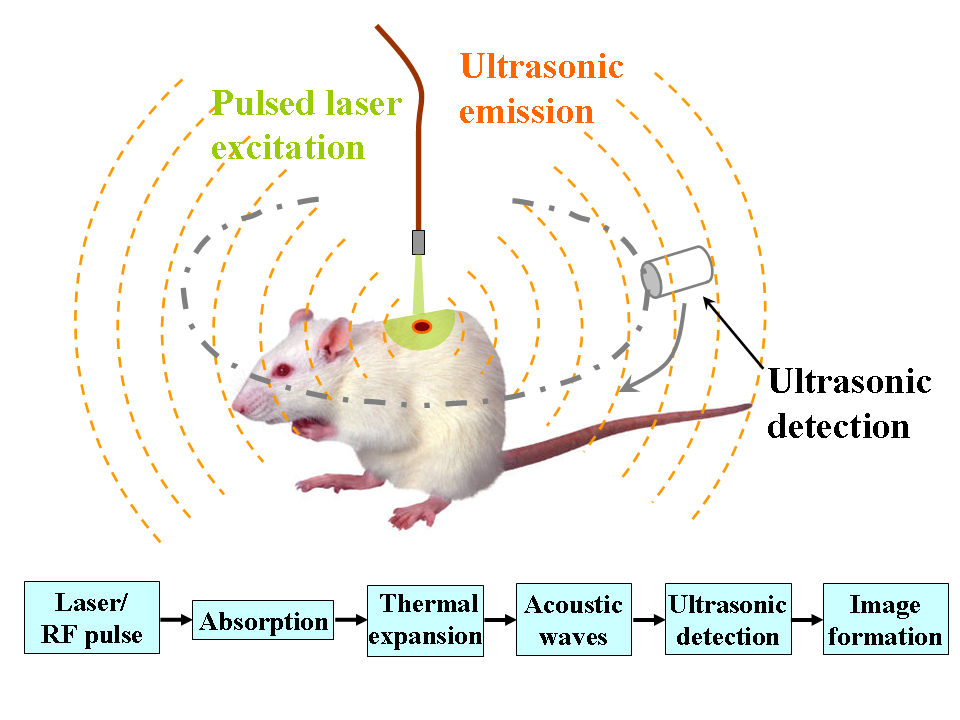
Photoacoustic Imaging can be used in-vivo to detect unusual cells in the bloodstream.

In-vivo systems using photoacoustic (PA) flow cytography have also aimed to allow the detection of unusual melanoma cells in the bloodstream of such patients in mouse models while a coupled laser eradicates the cell on the spot through thermal ablation. Due to the high red to near-infrared absorption spectrum of single and cluster melanoma cells at 1064 nm, they are able to be distinguished using sensitive PA imaging.

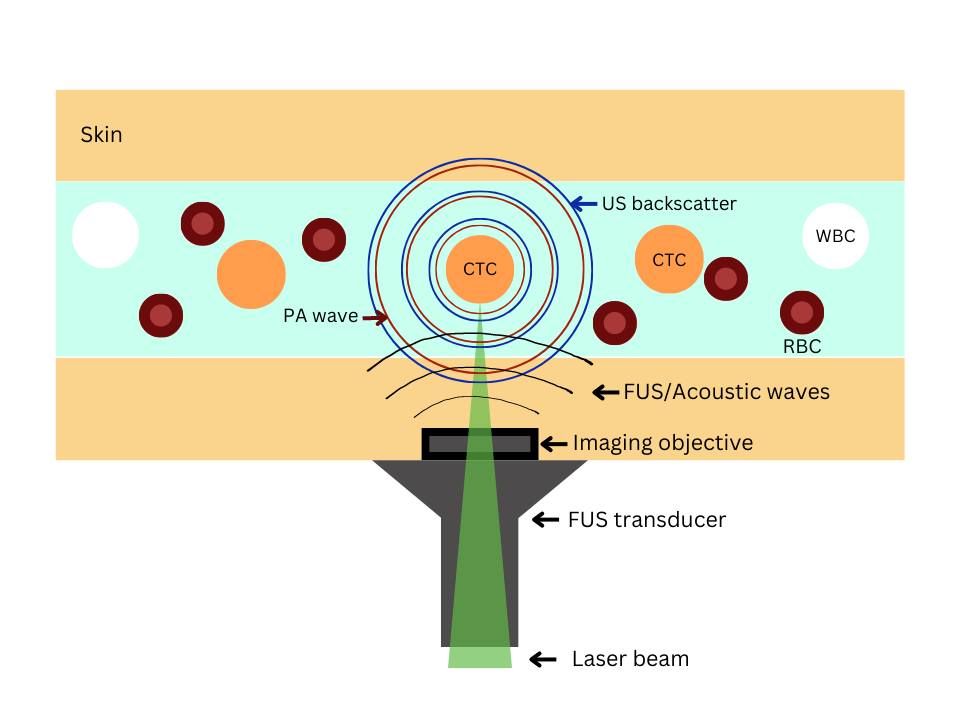
in-vivo cytometry methods use FUS paired with lasers to detect and differentiate circulating tumor cells from normal blood components by PA signals and US backscatter with a probe placed over the skin.

The use of FUS for in-vivo cytometry has been used in humans as well. For example, a group developed an in-vivo cytometry technique, the Cytophone, that uses focused-ultrasound to detect label-free circulating tumor cells (CTCs) in melanoma and healthy patients. This system has passed animal trials and used on humans. The technique uses vapor nano-bubbles that allow for amplification of acoustic signals to detect CTCs in the blood for melanoma screening. Photoacoustic (PA) waves resulting from a 1060 nm laser pulse over the skin hitting CTCs produces peaks in the PA signal compared to a neutral red blood cell reading and negative signals for other normal blood components. The Cytophone technology was able to detect 1 CTC/L of blood and diagnose 27 of 28 patients correctly which is generally regarded as more accurate than existing methods.

These photoacoustic flow cytometry (PAFC) systems coupled with FUS are being investigated aiming to allow non-invasive blood testing in various settings. For example, one application of such device was to determine what tumor manipulation methods might increase CTCs in the bloodstream in-turn providing information that may be used to enhance surgical intervention techniques. Another application used a system that combines photoacoustic and ultrasound to detect tumor angiogenesis at high resolutions in-vivo with mouse models to detect melanoma phantoms.

=== Acoustofluidics for vasculature imaging ===
Alternatively, acoustofluidics, or the use of FUS to manipulate particles under flow at lower wavelengths, has been used to separate cells and various particles in diagnostic applications. FUS can further be used for imaging using super-harmonic ultrasound. An example of this is acoustic angiography where FUS is used to reach high resolutions for this technique. Similar studies use targeted microbubbles along with super-harmonic signals to produce high resolution 3D images of microvasculature and molecular imaging. This in-vivo imaging technique allowed diagnosis of fibrosarcoma in a rat model.

Microbubbles and nanobubbles can also have different moieties bound to them to be able to detect, for example, angiogenesis in tumor environments, inflammation, or prostate cancer delineation. Passive targeting involves modulating microbubble composition to allow incorporation into a specific tissue or cell while active targeting involves adding targeting moieties to the MB covalently or using strept(avidin)-biotin click chemistry. They can also be non-targeted and used for routine imaging.

Microbubbles can also pose as theranostics, using ultrasound imaging to locate the tumor via targeted MBs then destroying the MBs to release therapeutic drugs on-site. Microbubbles with molecular markers VEGFR2 and αvβ3 integrin have been used in many preclinical tests for detecting cancers by attaching to tumor vasculature-specific receptors. In cancers including pancreatic cancer, ovarian cancer, and squamous cell carcinoma, targeted microbubbles were successfully used to assess angiogenesis and cytotoxicity by MB accumulation and ultrasound intensity detection. Targeted molecular ultrasound can also be used for non-cancerous applications such as inflammation in atherosclerosis patients where plaque-targeted MBs determined intensity of plaque buildup and severity of atherosclerosis therefrom.

== In-vitro methods ==
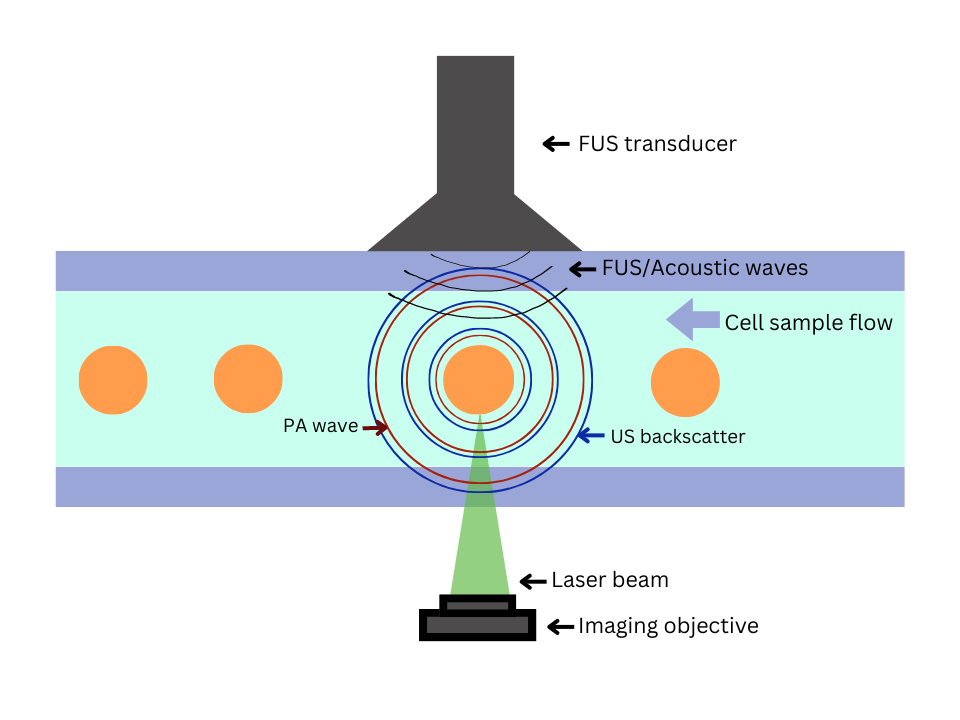
In-vitro cytometry methods use FUS paired with lasers to detect biomarkers in a sample flowing through a microfluidic system via PA waves and US backscatter signals.

Applications of FUS also include in-vitro methods. Studies have shown that FUS can be used to overcome limitations of current cytometry methods that often require cytotoxic fluorescent markers and do not usually provide detailed information about cell types. Acoustic waves, often used interchangeably with ultrasound, have been used to irradiate cells and their photoacoustic response in turn measured to differentiate cells without the need for lysis buffers, tagging agents, and further sample preparation methods. One study showed that acoustic flow cytometer (AFC) can use ultra-high frequency ultrasound to detect cells and particles under flow without the need for labelling. By incorporating an ultrasound transducer that detects both ultrasonic backscatter and PA signals, the device is able to distinguish cell types in a polydimethylsiloxane (PDMS)-based microfluidic device with relative accuracy. The red blood cell and white blood cell count using AFC was found to be accurate compared with the conventional Fluorescence-activated cell sorting (FACS) results.

Similar technologies are being investigated to make improvements to in-vitro testing of diseases. One such device uses acoustofluidics for detecting Alzheimer's disease. Acoustofluidics allowed the detection of Alzheimer-specific biomarkers. This process is in-vitro requiring a patient's plasma sample and the use of ultrasound to detect nano-sized biomarkers. Ultrasound in the form of acoustics has been shown to improve microfluidic techniques by allowing control over the liquid and interaction kinetics through bulk acoustic waves (BAW) or surface acoustic waves (SAW).

== Challenges and Limitations ==
Some of the challenges for acoustofluidic microdevices include manufacturing, since the development must take place in a cleanroom and there is need for expensive materials limiting scaling and industrialization. Additionally, while a device may be portable, concerns include supplementary devices such as amplifiers and generators detering large-scale manufacturing. For example, the manufacturing of acoustic microreactors may hinder their portability potential due to various necessary equipment required with the device.

Health effects are also of concern to researchers and clinicians with the use of focused ultrasound because long duration of FUS at certain wavelengths can induce further damage to surrounding tissues which proposes the need for safety parameters for such devices. Furthermore, side effects such as allergies and other adverse reactions have been noted in some FUS-mediated diagnostic methods which may be worsened by preexisting conditions. In BBB-disruption, specifically, the concern for affected neuroplasticity exists. Determining the exact amplitude of FUS for sonicating is especially important since high amplitudes have been reported to lead to intracranial hemorrhage.

With in-vitro uses of FUS, only size and number of cells can be detected but studies have noted that information about the cell structure or organelles are unavailable. However, improving in-vitro diagnostic systems is still being researched. A common biomarker cancer detection technique relies on ctDNA, but this biomarker is currently suspected to have various limitations. Some limitations related to using ctDNA biomarkers include the lack of specificity for detection of rare cancers and low release rate from certain tumors. In such cases, however, FUS-microbubble sonication systems are being investigated for increase in tumor permeability and detection rate of cancers or allow drug delivery.

Focused-ultrasound mediated diagnostics is an expanding area in research that is often paired with the aim of using FUS to better detect or release biomarkers or to allow for a local drug delivery technique.
