= Digital variance angiography =

Medical image processing method

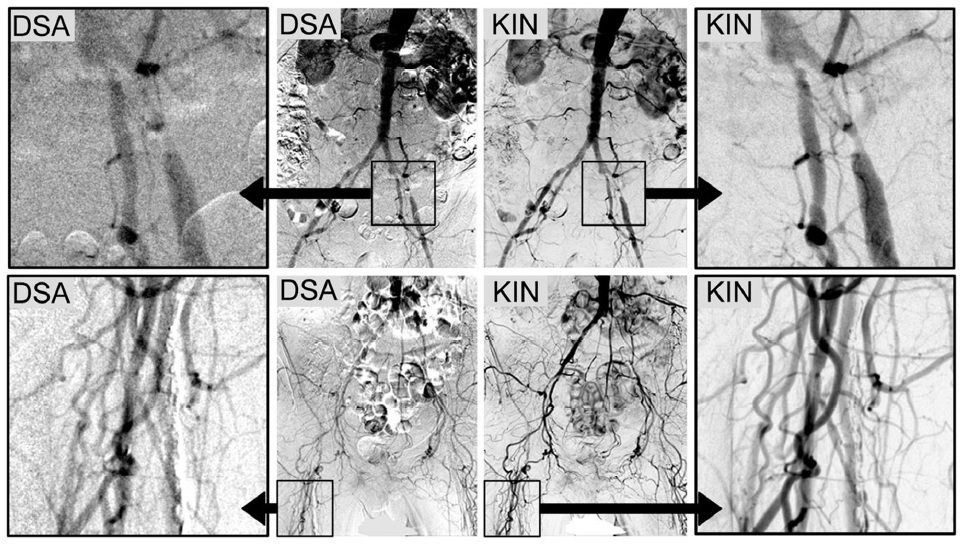
Comparison of kinetic images(KIN) and DSA images in abdominal (top row) and iliac regions (bottom row).

Digital variance angiography (DVA) is a novel image processing method based on kinetic imaging, which allows the visualization of motion on image sequences generated by penetrating radiations. DVA is a specific form of kinetic imaging: it requires angiographic image series, which are created by X-ray or fluoroscopic imaging and by the administration of contrast media during various medical procedures. The resulting single DVA image visualizes the path of contrast agent with relatively low background noise.

Between 2017 and 2019, two clinical studies have been performed to investigate the clinical usability of DVA and these studies have found that it has the potential to be used for low-dose radiographic imaging and carbon-dioxide angiography in the future.

DVA is currently under development by Kinetic Health Ltd. and Semmelweis University (Budapest, Hungary).

== Lower extremity DSA comparison study ==
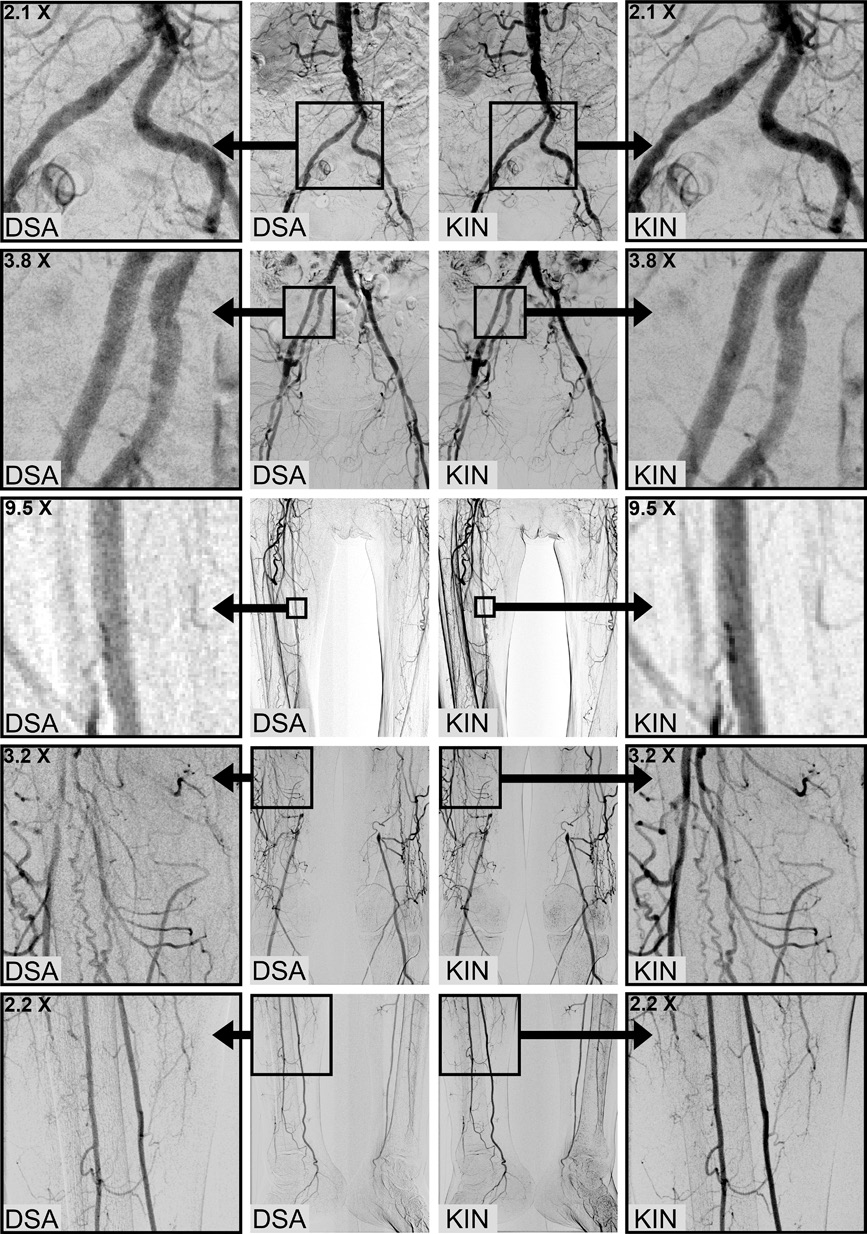
DSA (left) and DVA (KIN, right) image pairs, which were created by administering iodinated contrast agent. From top to bottom: abdominal, iliac, femoral, popliteal and crural regions.

In 2018 Gyánó M. et al. compared the quality of DVA and DSA (digital subtraction angiography) images in a prospective observational crossover study, which involved the analysis of 232 image pairs of 42 patients undergoing lower limb x-ray angiography (performed by using iodinated contrast agent) between February and June 2017. Methods included the measurement of SNR (signal-to-noise ratio) and visual quality comparison.

=== Signal-to-noise ratio ===
Although other factors like spatial resolution, sharpness, and object size may contribute to image quality and object perceptibility, noise places a fundamental limitation on the ability to recognize structures on low-contrast images and that was the main reason why the SNR measurement method was chosen. The results showed 2-3 times higher SNR values in the case of DVA images compared to traditionally used DSA images, which has indicated that DVA has the potential to improve the ability to view blood vessels, since a higher SNR value indicates lower noise levels.

=== Visual comparison ===
Qualitative comparison has been performed by three vascular surgeons and three interventional radiologists, with about 17 years of experience on the average. In an online visual questionnaire, which showed DVA and DSA image pairs of the same anatomical regions, raters were asked to choose the image which they found to be more useful for making the diagnosis. Overall, the raters judged the kinetic images better in 69% of all images. Regarding different anatomical regions, the raters agreed that the DVA was significantly better for talocrural and popliteal regions.

=== Conclusion ===
Since the SNR is proportional to radiation dose, the authors have concluded that the higher SNR values indicate that the DVA method has the ability to generate angiographic images which have the same quality as the currently used DSA, but the dose of the administered radiation and/or contrast media could be lowered to achieve the same vessel visibility.

== Carbon-dioxide angiography ==
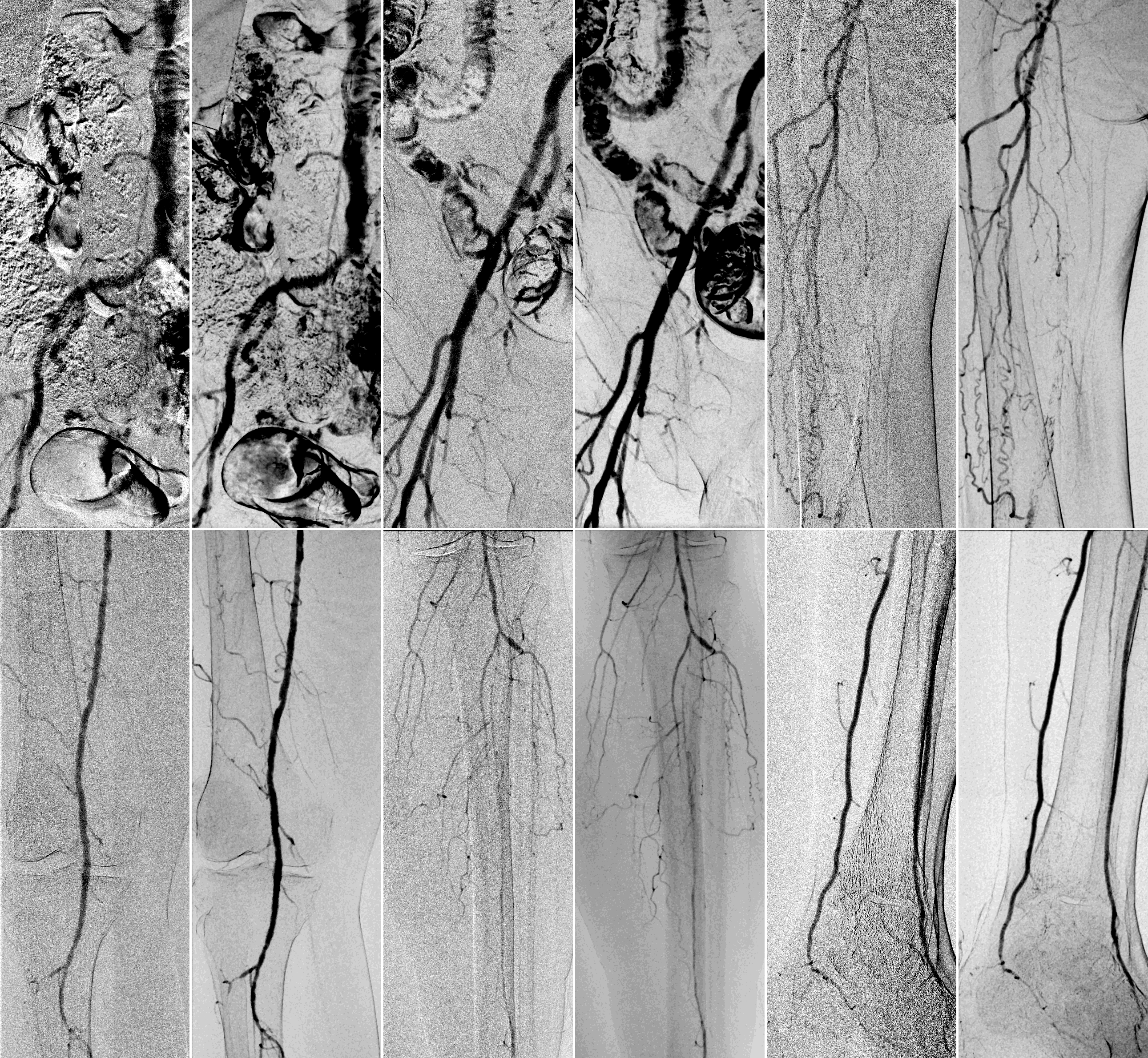
DSA (left) and DVA (right) carbon-dioxide angiography image pairs. Top row: abdominal, iliac and femoral region. Bottom row: Popliteal, crural and ankle regions.

In 2019 Óriás V. et al. published the results of a clinical study, which investigated the feasibility of digital variance angiography (DVA) in lower extremity carbon-dioxide angiography and compared the quantitative and qualitative performance of the new image processing technique to that of the current reference standard digital subtraction angiography (DSA).

=== Materials and methods ===
The study enrolled 24 patients undergoing lower limb carbon-dioxide angiography between December 2017 and April 2018 at two clinical centres in Hungary. For comparison, the signal-to-noise ratio (SNR) of DSA and DVA images were calculated and the visual quality of DSA and DVA images were also compared by independent clinical specialists using an online questionnaire.

=== Results ===
The ratio of SNR DVA /SNR DSA was calculated and the median values for the two centres were 3.53 and 4.52. During the visual evaluation 120 DSA and DVA image pairs were compared and it was judged that the DVA provided higher quality images in both centres, in 78% and 90% of comparisons. DVA images also received consistently higher individual rating than DSA images, regardless of the research site and anatomical region.

=== Conclusion ===
As the authors conclude, these results have shown that in lower limb carbon-dioxide angiography DVA, regardless of the image acquisition instruments and protocols, produces higher signal-to-noise ratio and significantly better image quality than DSA, therefore this new image processing method might help the widespread use of carbon-dioxide as a safer contrast agent in clinical practice.

== Ongoing research projects ==
Several oral presentations and posters have been presented at CIRSE 2019 conference about ongoing research projects, including the study of possible application of DVA during prostatic artery embolization and the development of new algorithms for DVA to further improve image quality, which would create a 'quality reserve' and allow the reduction of radiation and contrast media dose.

== See also ==
- X-ray imaging
- Fluoroscopy
- Angiography
