= Campeau =

Campeau is a surname. Notable people with the surname include:

- Charles-Édouard Campeau (1916–1992), Canadian engineer and politician
- Frank Campeau (1864–1943), actor
- Jean Campeau (1931–2025), Canadian businessman and politician
- Lucien Campeau (1927–2010), Canadian cardiologist
- Robert Campeau (1923–2017), Canadian financier and real estate developer
- Rychard Campeau (born 1952), ice hockey player
- Tod Campeau (1923–2009), ice hockey player
- Jennifer Campeau (born 1973), politician

== See also ==
- Campeau Corporation, real estate company
- Commission on the Political and Constitutional Future of Quebec, aka the Bélanger-Campeau Commission
