= Gensini score =

Clinical test to quantify angiographic atherosclerosis

Gensini score is a widely used means of quantifying angiographic atherosclerosis, where a zero score indicates absence of atherosclerotic disease. The Gensini score accounts for the degree of artery narrowing as well as locations of narrowing.
