= Focused ultrasound for intracranial drug delivery =

Medical technique

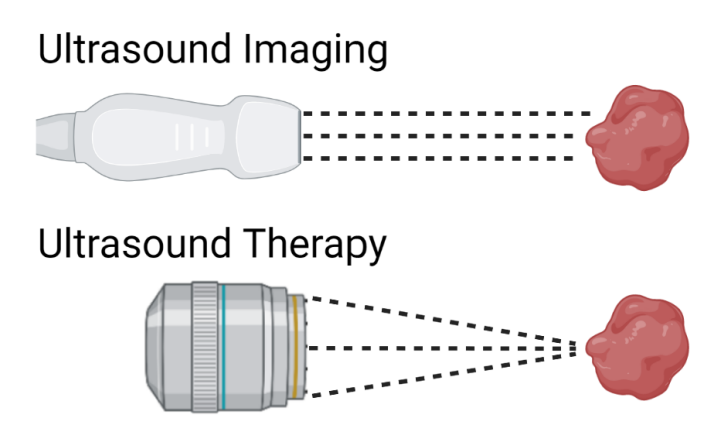
Ultrasound imaging deposits energy over a large area while therapeutic ultrasound focuses the energy on one target site.

Focused ultrasound for intracrainial drug delivery is a non-invasive technique that uses high-frequency sound waves (focused ultrasound, or FUS) to disrupt tight junctions in the blood–brain barrier (BBB), allowing for increased passage of therapeutics into the brain. The BBB normally blocks nearly 98% of drugs from accessing the central nervous system, so FUS has the potential to address a major challenge in intracranial drug delivery by providing targeted and reversible BBB disruption. Using FUS to enhance drug delivery to the brain could significantly improve patient outcomes for a variety of diseases including Alzheimer's disease, Parkinson's disease, and brain cancer.

Ultrasound is commonly used in the medical field for imaging and diagnostic purposes. With FUS, a curved transducer, lens, or phased array is used to guide the ultrasound waves to a particular location, similar to the way a magnifying glass can focus sunlight to a single point. This strategy concentrates the acoustic energy in a small target area while having a minimal effect on the surrounding tissue. Depending on the acoustic parameters, FUS can be used to exert mechanical and/or thermal effects on target tissues, making it a versatile and promising tool for many therapeutic applications.

== Blood–brain barrier ==
The BBB is a highly specialized structure composed of endothelial cells, pericytes, and astrocytic processes and is situated between the cerebral capillaries and brain parenchyma. The endothelial cells form tight junctions, creating a semi-permeable membrane that separates circulating blood from the central nervous system. Various mechanisms are used to transport molecules across the BBB. Small polar molecules such as glucose, amino acids, and nucleosides enter the brain through carrier-mediated transport. Small lipophilic molecules and gaseous molecules such as oxygen and carbon dioxide can passively diffuse through the BBB. Large molecules such as proteins and peptides use receptor-mediated or absorption-mediated endocytic transport to access the brain.

The BBB is crucial for structural and functional brain connectivity and plays a major role in protecting the brain from circulating pathogens. However, the BBB is also a key impediment for intracranial drug delivery and significantly limits entry of therapeutic molecules into the brain. Generally, only lipid-soluble molecules with a low molecular weight (around ~400 Da) and a positive charge can cross the BBB. Many therapeutic molecules do not have these properties and thus have difficulty entering the brain. For example, doxorubicin, a common chemotherapeutic, is ~540 Da in size and trastuzumab, a monoclonal antibody, is 148 kDa in size. The molecular weight of these molecules significantly hinders their ability to pass through the tight junctions present in the BBB.

Since the BBB limits the bioavailability of therapeutics in treating neurological diseases, many strategies have been developed to circumvent the BBB. Osmotic agents disrupt the BBB by causing osmotic shrinkage of the endothelial cells and creating an osmotic pressure gradient. However, this strategy results in global rather than localized BBB opening which can lead to neurological deficits and seizures. Intracranial injections can be used to directly deliver drugs to a specific part of the brain. While these injections limit systemic toxicities and remove the loss of drug from first pass clearance, these procedures are invasive and can pose additional risk to the patient. Convection enhanced delivery uses an intracranial catheter to deliver drug through the interstitial spaces of the central nervous system. This strategy is also quite invasive as it requires insertion of the catheter into the brain and the diffusion of drug from the catheter tip is limited. Radiation therapy is known to increase BBB permeability, but the temporal characteristics of radiation-induced opening are unpredictable and radiation can damage the surrounding brain tissue by causing necrosis, demyelination, and gliosis. Focused ultrasound has the potential to address the limitations posed by these strategies by offering a method for non-invasive, temporally-controlled, and localized BBB disruption.

== Thermal and cavitation assisted FUS-induced BBB opening ==
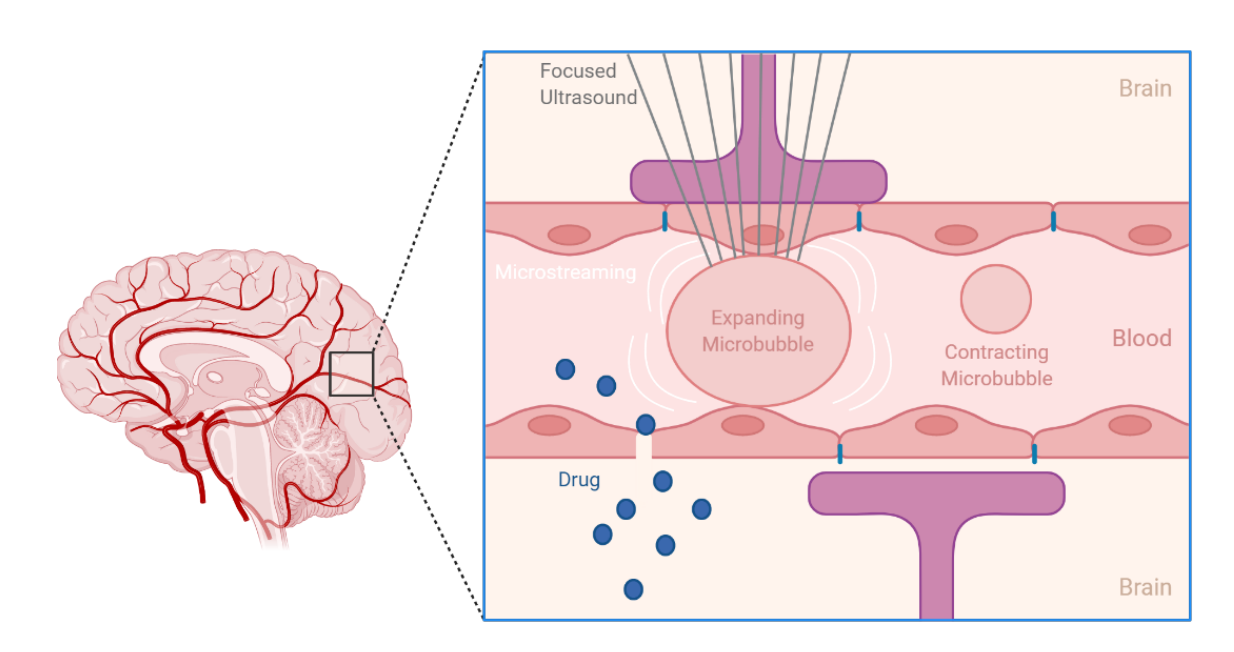
Stable cavitation of intravascular microbubbles with FUS applies mechanical forces on BBB to increase permeability for drug delivery.

Early studies that investigated the use of FUS for BBB disruption used ultrasound to increase the permeability of the blood vessels either by increasing the temperature (usually to 40-45°C) or forming gas bubbles (inertial cavitation). While these studies concluded that this method could be used to open the BBB, damage to healthy tissue was always reported. In 2004, it was discovered that the threshold for thermal BBB disruption is greater than the threshold for thermal damage, meaning thermal BBB disruption cannot be performed without causing some damage to the brain tissue. Nevertheless, ultrasound hyperthermia may still be useful for intracranial drug delivery. In vitro studies showed that moderate ultrasound hyperthermia (temperature elevations ≤ 6°C) increases endothelial cell permeability to hydrophobic molecules. FUS hyperthermia has also been used with radiation therapy to treat patients with brain tumors since FUS sensitizes tumor cells to radiation by inhibiting DNA damage repair and disrupting the protein kinase B signaling pathway. Studies have also shown that FUS can be used to both thermally ablate brain tumors and improve delivery of chemotherapy through reversible BBB opening to kill any remaining malignant cells. However, since thermal BBB disruption cannot be induced without damaging tissue, it may not be useful for non-cancer applications in which preserving healthy tissue may be essential.

Cavitation occurs when gas bubbles grow, oscillate, and collapse in a fluid during exposure to ultrasound waves. There are two general types of cavitation: stable and inertial. Stable cavitation occurs when the gas bubbles oscillate, and these oscillations are sustained for many cycles of acoustic pressure. These oscillations move the surrounding fluid, generating flow around the bubble. This flow is known as microstreaming and can increase the amount of drug that passes through the openings in the tight junctions. Inertial cavitation is typically transient and results in the collapse or fragmentation of bubbles. Low acoustic pressures are used to induce stable cavitation while higher ultrasound intensities lead to inertial cavitation. Both stable and inertial cavitation apply mechanical stress to the blood vessel walls, temporarily disrupting the tight junctions between the endothelial cells. This is typically done through a push-pull action in which the bubble expansion separates the endothelial lining while the bubble contraction causes invagination of the vascular lining. Transiently disrupting the BBB allows for paracellular transport of molecules, and there is evidence that the physical stress induced on the vessel walls by the gas bubbles causes cellular changes that further enhance paracellular and transcellular transport of therapeutics across the BBB. However, this mechanical stress can damage the blood vessels, and inertial cavitation is generally avoided for BBB opening since it poses the greatest risk for injury.

== Microbubble-mediated FUS-induced BBB opening ==
Due to the safety and efficacy issues related to thermal and cavitation-assisted FUS-induced BBB opening, research has focused on using preformed microbubbles to further enhance the effects of FUS. Microbubbles are small bubbles with diameters typically between .5 and 10 microns. The core is typically filled with gas, but microbubbles can also be loaded with active drug for therapeutic purposes. The microbubble shell is typically composed of polymers, lipids, proteins, or a combination of these components. Since these microbubbles are lipophilic, they can diffuse through the BBB. In 2001, Hynynen et al. used microbubbles in conjunction with FUS to induce BBB opening without causing tissue damage. By injecting microbubbles into the blood before sonication, they found the intensities required to disrupt the BBB were two times lower than the intensity required with FUS alone. Furthermore, they discovered that the BBB was restored 24 hours after the FUS treatment. Following this study, several groups have reported effective intracranial drug delivery using microbubbles with different FUS parameters. Many researchers have concluded that ultrasound pressure is the most important parameter to optimize to avoid injuring blood vessels and surrounding brain tissue. It has been seen that greater ultrasound pressure is required to allow a 2000 kDa drug to cross the BBB compared to a 70 kDa drug. In rodent models, it has been shown that BBB disruption with microbubbles is effective over a wide range of ultrasound frequencies from 28 kHz to 8 MHz. While the repetition frequency of the ultrasound bursts do not significantly affect BBB opening, if the burst frequency is too high, the microbubbles cannot effectively reperfuse the target area. The properties of the microbubbles themselves can affect treatment efficacy. As microbubble size and dose increase, BBB opening increases and there is a greater risk for damage.

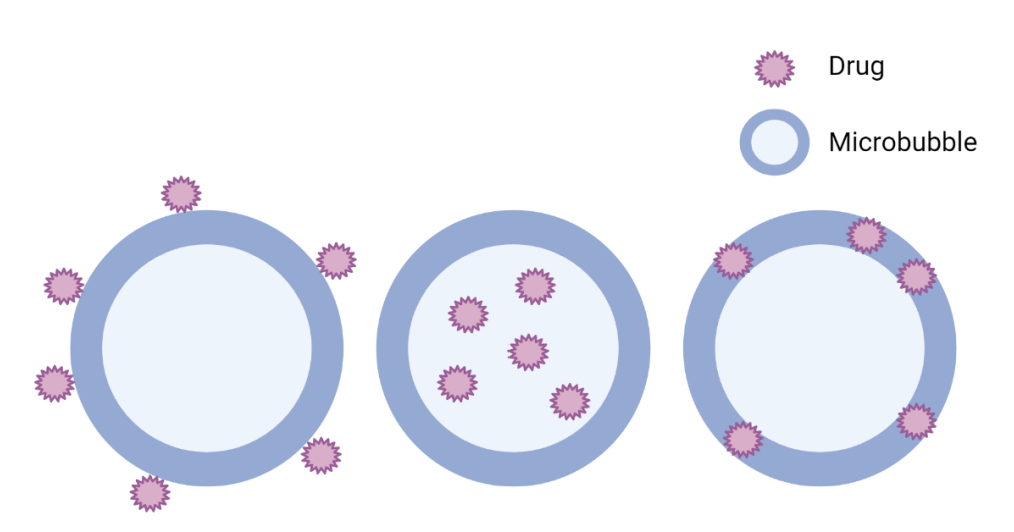
Mechanisms for loading microbubbles with drug including attaching the drug to the microbubble surface (left), encapsulating the drug inside the microbubble (middle), or embedding the drug in the microbubble membrane (right).

Microbubbles can also serve as effective drug carriers. Drugs can be adhered to the surface of microbubbles, encapsulated inside the microbubble, or embedded in the microbubble membrane. Ligands can also be conjugated to the surface of microbubbles to target specific sites. FUS-induced cavitation can be used to burst the microbubbles and release drug near the diseased region. This method achieves local drug release while limiting off-target toxicities. Drug-loaded microbubbles with FUS has been shown to be an attractive combination therapy for brain tumors. One study found that the ultrasound-triggered release of doxorubicin from loaded microbubbles resulted in a two-fold decrease in human glioblastoma cell survival rate compared to free doxorubicin or loaded microbubbles without FUS. Another study found encapsulating carmustine in microbubbles led to a five-fold increase in the circulating half-life and a five-fold decrease in drug accumulation in the liver. This study also found combining these carmustine-loaded microbubbles with FUS increased the median survival time by 12% in a rat glioma model. Due to the promising results seen with drug-loaded microbubbles and FUS for brain tumor treatment, this method may also have potential for treating other neurological disorders such as Alzheimer's and Parkinson's disease.

== Drug delivery and therapeutic effects ==
FUS for intracranial drug delivery has many potential benefits for both cancer and non-cancer applications. Examples of studies that used FUS to deliver therapeutics into the brain are summarized below.

Delivered Therapeutic	Disease	Application	Link
Doxorubicin	Malignant Glioma	In vitro study of FUS with doxorubicin liposome-loaded microbubbles to increase doxorubicin uptake by human glioblastoma cells	
Carmustine	Glioblastoma Multiforme	Assess treatment efficacy of carmustine-loaded microbubbles with FUS in rat glioma model	
Doxorubicin	Glioblastoma Multiforme	Doxorubicin-loaded microbubbles conjugated to iron oxide nanoparticles allowing for magnetic targeting in a rat glioma model	
Carmustine	Glioblastoma Multiforme	Carmustine-loaded microbubbles with FUS to achieve stable cavitation and reduce risk of intracranial hemorrhage in tumor-bearing rats	
Doxorubicin	Glioblastoma Multiforme	Pulsed FUS and doxorubicin-loaded liposomes conjugated to human atherosclerotic plaque-specific peptide-1 to enhance delivery of drug to tumors in mice	
Anti-programmed cell death-ligand 1 antibody (aPD-L1)	Brainstem Glioma	FUS and intranasally-injected aPD-L1 (immune checkpoint inhibitor) to cross BBB and enhance delivery to mouse brainstem	
Trastuzumab	Her2-positive Brain Metastases	Clinical trial demonstrating use of FUS to achieve targeted delivery of monoclonal antibody to the brain	
Paclitaxel	Glioblastoma Multiforme	Paclixatel liposomes, microbubbles, and FUS to improve chemotherapy efficacy in glioblastoma-bearing mice	
Doxorubicin	Diffuse Intrinsic Pontine Glioma (DIPG)	FUS followed systemic administration of doxorubicin to enhance intracranial delivery in DIPG mouse model	
Epirubicin	Glioblastoma Multiforme	Magnetic nanoparticles conjugated to epirubicin with FUS to treat brain tumor in rat model	
Brain-derived neurotrophic factor (BDNF)	Parkinson's Disease (PD)	FUS-enhanced intranasal delivery of BDNF to improve motor function in PD mouse model	
Paclitaxel	Glioblastoma Multiforme	In vivo study comparing paclitaxel dissolved in cremophor and albumin-bound paclitaxel to increase drug concentration in tumor-bearing mice following FUS and microbubble administration	
Cisplatin	Malignant Glioma	FUS and PEGylated brain-penetrating nanoparticles loaded with cisplatin to reduce tumor invasiveness and growth in rat glioma model	
Bevacizumab	Glioblastoma Multiforme	FUS in the presence of microbubbles to enhance bevacizumab penetration into the CNS of glioma-bearing mice	
Anti-amyloid-beta antibodies	Alzheimer's Disease (AD)	FUS increased permeability of BBB to anti-Aβ antibodies and reduced plaque pathology in AD mouse model	

== Challenges and future directions ==
While FUS has many potential advantages for intracranial drug delivery, there are several limitations. Heterogeneity in the acoustic properties of the skull leads to distortion and attenuation of the ultrasound. Intracranial structures such as gray and white matter and dense vasculature also vary between patients, so each individual may have a unique threshold for BBB opening. Patient-specific ultrasound arrays may need to be used to address this concern. After the procedure, MRI contrast agents are given to patients to measure BBB opening, so currently there is no method for intraoperative monitoring of BBB disruption. For strategies that use magnetic resonance guidance, the need for pre-procedural removal of hair, substantial operating time, and use of stereotactic frame may limit the widespread use of FUS for intracranial drug delivery. Treatment protocols and dosing schedules for many therapeutic molecules still need to be better understood to ensure off-target toxicities are limited. Finally, many studies investigating FUS for intracranial drug delivery use animals with healthy BBBs, but several neurological diseases break down the BBB, so current animal models may not be very representative.

Despite the limitations, FUS is a promising tool for improving the treatment of many disorders. FUS is currently being studied to facilitate intracranial gene delivery for the treatment of Alzheimer's disease. A similar approach is also being studied for Parkinson's disease. The ability to disrupt the BBB could also allow for delivery of therapeutics to the motor cortex to treat amyotrophic lateral sclerosis. There may also be applications of FUS for both neuromodulation and targeted drug delivery in epilepsy, Alzheimer's disease, Parkinson's disease, depression, and traumatic brain injury. In the future, research efforts will focus on addressing the challenges and limitations of FUS to develop safe and effective therapies for the most challenging brain conditions.

== See also ==
- Drug delivery to the brain
