= Drug delivery to the brain =

Passing of drugs through the blood brain-barrier

Drug delivery to the brain is the process of passing therapeutically active molecules across the blood–brain barrier into the brain. This is a complex process that must take into account the complex anatomy of the brain as well as the restrictions imposed by the special junctions of the blood–brain barrier.

== Anatomy ==
The blood–brain barrier is formed by special tight junctions between endothelial cells lining brain blood vessels. Blood vessels of all tissues contain this monolayer of endothelial cells, however only brain endothelial cells have tight junctions preventing passive diffusion of most substances into the brain tissue. The structure of these tight junctions was first determined in the 1960s by Tom Reese, Morris Kranovsky, and Milton Brightman. Furthermore, astrocytic "end feet", the terminal regions of the astrocytic processes, surround the outside of brain capillary endothelial cells". The astrocytes are glial cells restricted to the brain and spinal cord and help maintain blood-brain barrier properties in brain endothelial cells.

== Physiology ==
The primary function of the blood-brain barrier is to protect the brain and keep it isolated from harmful toxins that are potentially in the blood stream. It accomplishes this because of its structure, as is usual in the body that structure defines its function. The tight junctions between the endothelial cells prevent large molecules and many ions from passing between the junction spaces. This forces molecules to go through the endothelial cells to enter the brain tissue, meaning that they must pass through the cell membranes of the endothelial cells. Because of this, the only molecules that can easily transverse the blood–brain barrier are very lipid-soluble ones. These are not the only molecules that can transverse the blood–brain barrier; glucose, oxygen and carbon dioxide are not lipid-soluble but are actively transported across the barrier, to support the normal cellular function of the brain. The fact that molecules have to fully transverse the endothelial cells makes them a perfect barricade to unspecified particles from entering the brain, working to protect the brain at all costs. Also, because most molecules are transported across the barrier, it does a very effective job of maintaining homeostasis for the most vital organ of the human body.

== Drug delivery to the blood–brain barrier ==
Because of the difficulty for drugs to pass through the blood–brain barrier, a study was conducted to determine the factors that influence a compound's ability to transverse the blood–brain barrier. In this study, they examined several different factors to investigate diffusion across the blood–brain barrier. They used lipophilicity, Gibbs Adsorption Isotherm, a Co CMC Plot, and the surface area of the drug to water and air. They began by looking at compounds whose blood–brain permeability was known and labeled them either CNS+ or CNS- for compounds that easily transverse the barrier and those that did not. They then set out to analyze the above factors to determine what is necessary to transverse the blood–brain barrier. What they found was a little surprising; lipophilicity is not the leading characteristic for a drug to pass through the barrier. This is surprising because one would think that the most effective way to make a drug move through a lipophilic barrier is to increase its lipophilicity, it turns out that it is a complex function of all of these characteristics that makes a drug able to pass through the blood–brain barrier. The study found that barrier permittivity is "based on the measurement of the surface activity and as such takes into account the molecular properties of both hydrophobic and charged residues of the molecule of interest." They found that there is not a simple answer to what compounds transverse the blood–brain barrier and what does not. Rather, it is based on the complex analysis of the surface activity of the molecule as well as relative size.

== Problems faced in drug delivery ==
Other problems persist besides just simply getting through the blood–brain barrier. The first of these is that a lot of times, even if a compound transverses the barrier, it does not do it in a way that the drug is in a therapeutically relevant concentration. This can have many causes, the most simple being that the way the drug was produced only allows a small amount to pass through the barrier. Another cause of this would be the binding to other proteins in the body rendering the drug ineffective to either be therapeutically active or able to pass through the barrier with the adhered protein. Another problem that must be accounted for is the presence of enzymes in the brain tissue that could render the drug inactive. The drug may be able to pass through the membrane fine, but will be deconstructed once it is inside the brain tissue rendering it useless. All of these are problems that must be addressed and accounted for in trying to deliver effective drug solutions to the brain tissue.

== Possible solutions ==
=== Exosomes to deliver treatments across the blood–brain barrier ===
A group from the University of Oxford led by Prof. Matthew Wood claims that exosomes can cross the blood–brain barrier and deliver siRNAs, antisense oligonucleotides, chemotherapeutic agents and proteins specifically to neurons after inject them systemically (in blood). Because these exosomes are able to cross the blood–brain barrier, this protocol could solve the issue of poor delivery of medications to the central nervous system and cure Alzheimer's, Parkinson's Disease and brain cancer, among other diseases. The laboratory has been recently awarded a major new €30 million project leading experts from 14 academic institutions, two biotechnology companies and seven pharmaceutical companies to translate the concept to the clinic.

=== Pro-drugs ===
This is the process of disguising medically active molecules with lipophilic molecules that allow it to better sneak through the blood–brain barrier. Drugs can be disguised using more lipophilic elements or structures. This form of the drug will be inactive because of the lipophilic molecules but then would be activated, by either enzyme degradation or some other mechanism for removal of the lipophilic disguise to release the drug into its active form. There are still some major drawbacks to these pro-drugs. The first of which is that the pro-drug may be able to pass through the barrier and then also re-pass through the barrier without ever releasing the drug in its active form. The second is the sheer size of these types of molecules makes it still difficult to pass through the blood–brain barrier.

=== Peptide masking ===
Similar to the idea of pro-drugs, another way of masking the drugs chemical composition is by masking a peptide's characteristics by combining with other molecular groups that are more likely to pass through the blood–brain barrier. An example of this is using a cholesteryl molecule instead of cholesterol that serves to conceal the water soluble characteristics of the drug. This type of masking as well as aiding in traversing the blood–brain barrier. It also can work to mask the drug peptide from peptide-degrading enzymes in the brain Also a "targetor" molecule could be attached to the drug that helps it pass through the barrier and then once inside the brain, is degraded in such a way that the drug cannot pass back through the brain. Once the drug cannot pass back through the barrier the drug can be concentrated and made effective for therapeutic use. However drawbacks to this exist as well. Once the drug is in the brain there is a point where it needs to be degraded to prevent overdose to the brain tissue. Also if the drug cannot pass back through the blood–brain barrier, it compounds the issues of dosage and intense monitoring would be required. For this to be effective there must be a mechanism for the removal of the active form of the drug from the brain tissue.

=== Receptor-mediated permabilitizers ===
These are drug compounds that increase the permeability of the blood–brain barrier. By decreasing the restrictiveness of the barrier, it is much easier to get a molecule to pass through it. These drugs increase the permeability of the blood–brain barrier temporarily by increasing the osmotic pressure in the blood which loosens the tight junctions between the endothelial cells. By loosening the tight junctions normal injection of drugs through an [IV] can take place and be effective to enter the brain. This must be done in a very controlled environment because of the risk associated with these drugs. Firstly, the brain can be flooded with molecules that are floating through the blood stream that are usually blocked by the barrier. Secondly, when the tight junctions loosen, the homeostasis of the brain can also be thrown off which can result in seizures and the compromised function of the brain.

=== Nanoparticles ===
The most promising drug delivery system is using nanoparticle delivery systems, these are systems where the drug is bound to a nanoparticle capable of traversing the blood–brain barrier. The most promising compound for the nanoparticles is Human Serum Albumin (HSA). The main benefits of this is that particles made of HSA are well tolerated without serious side effects as well as the albumin functional groups can be utilized for surface modification that allows for specific cell uptake. These nanoparticles have been shown to transverse the blood–brain barrier carrying host drugs. To enhance the effectiveness of nanoparticles, scientists are attempting to coat the nanoparticles to make them more effective to cross the blood–brain barrier. Studies have shown that "the overcoating of the [nanoparticles] with polysorbate 80 yielded doxorubicin concentrations in the brain of up to 6 μg/g after i.v. injection of 5 mg/kg" as compared to no detectable increase in an injection of the drug alone or the uncoated nanoparticle. This is very new science and technology so the real effectiveness of this process has not been fully understood. However young the research is, the results are promising pointing to nanotechnology as the way forward in treating a variety of brain diseases.

=== Loaded microbubble-enhanced focused ultrasound ===
Microbubbles are small "bubbles" of mono-lipids that are able to pass through the blood–brain barrier. They form a lipophilic bubble that can easily move through the barrier. One barrier to this however is that these microbubbles are rather large, which prevents their diffusion into the brain. This is counteracted by a focused ultrasound. The ultrasound increases the permeability of the blood–brain barrier by causing interference in the tight junctions in localized areas. This combined with the microbubbles allows for a very specific area of diffusion for the microbubbles, because they can only diffuse where the ultrasound is disrupting the barrier. The hypothesis and usefulness of these is the possibility of loading a microbubble with an active drug to diffuse through the barrier and target a specific area. There are several important factors in making this a viable solution for drug delivery. The first is that the loaded microbubble must not be substantially greater than the unloaded bubble. This ensures that the diffusion will be similar and the ultrasound disruption will be enough to induce diffusion. A second factor that must be determined is the stability of the loaded micro-bubble. This means is the drug fully retained in the bubble or is there leakage. Lastly, it must be determined how the drug is to be released from the microbubble once it passes through the blood–brain barrier. Studies have shown the effectiveness of this method for getting drugs to specific sites in the brain in animal models.

== See also ==
- Retrometabolic drug design
