= Carbon dioxide angiography =

Diagnostic radiographic technique

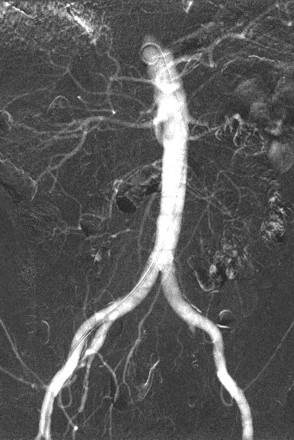
CO2 Angiogram showing Abdominal Aorta, visceral arteries and iliac arteries

Carbon dioxide angiography is a diagnostic radiographic technique in which a carbon dioxide (CO_{2}) based contrast medium is used - unlike traditional angiography where the contrast medium normally used is iodine based – to see and study the body vessels. Since CO_{2} is a non-radio-opaque contrast medium, angiographic procedures need to be performed in digital subtraction angiography (DSA).

== History ==
The use of carbon dioxide as a contrast agent goes back to 1920s when the gas was used to visualize retroperitoneal structures. In the 1950s and early 1960s, CO_{2} was injected intravenously to delineate the right atrium for the detection of pericardial effusion. This imaging technique developed from animal and clinical studies which demonstrated that CO_{2} was safe and well tolerated with venous injections. In the early 1970s, Dr. Hawkins and Dr. Cho started using and studying CO_{2} as a contrast agent also for peripheral vascular imaging and intervention. With the advent of digital subtraction angiography (DSA) technique in 1980s, CO_{2} has evolved into a safe and useful alternative contrast agent in both arteriography and venography. Because of its lack of renal toxicity and allergic potential, CO_{2} is a preferred contrast agent in patients with renal failure or iodinated contrast medium allergy, and particularly in patients who require large volumes of contrast medium for complex endovascular procedures.

== Technique ==
CO_{2} angiography is intended only for peripheral procedures. In case of procedures in the arterious system it is allowed to inject CO_{2} only below the diaphragm; while in the venous system it can also be investigated supradiaphragmatic, provided that the cerebral vessels are excluded. Taking this aspect into consideration, the practical approach follows that of the iodinated contrast procedures. The contrast injection can be carried out, similarly, both with manual devices and with automatic injectors (Automated Carbon Dioxide Angiography, ACDA).

== Properties ==
Being naturally present in the human body, CO_{2} is the only 100% biocompatible contrast agent, meaning no adverse reactions, such as allergy, nephrotoxicity, and hepatotoxicity.

Carbon dioxide is a negative contrast medium and it has a low radiopacity (while iodinated contrast media are defined as positive contrast media due to their high radiopacity). Contrast is caused by the different X-ray absorption coefficients between the tissue and the contrast agent. In the vascular imaging results produced using CO_{2}, vessels look brighter rather than the surrounding tissues, because the contrast medium absorbs less X-ray radiations rather an iodine-based contrast medium, where the vessel are displayed in black.

The CO_{2} does not mix with blood. At atmospheric pressure CO_{2} is in gaseous form and, when it comes out from the catheter, it forms a train of bubbles which displaces blood, causing a transient ischemia, in relation to the bloodstream (systolic pressure). When added together by DSA “stacking” software, the result is a composite diagnostic image of the frames.

Carbon dioxide is highly soluble, allowing multiple injections without a maximum dosage (per procedure, while it is 100 mL per injection by the literature), but, in case of multiple injections, should be considered and adequate time interval between them, so to allow the gas to be expelled from the body. Compared with the oxygen, the most present gaseous substance in the body, CO_{2} is more than 20 times more soluble, meaning the possibility of injecting high quantities in the body.

High compressibility and explosive delivery. More pressure is exerted to the gas, more its density increases, resulting in a decrease in gas volume and an increase in gas pressure. The effusion of the gas from the catheter orifice into a state of lower pressure, such as a blood vessel, leads to a sudden increase in the volume of the gas - the “explosive delivery” or “jet effect” - which could lead to an excessive stress in vessels walls. To avoid this, immediately prior to the injection of CO_{2}, a flush is performed, injecting small amounts of CO_{2} to reduce gas compression and guarantee gas delivery at a steady flow rate.

CO_{2} is 400 times less viscous than iodinated contrast medium, allowing its injection through devices with a very little inner lumen, as microcatheters, or, even, with other devices inserted in the catheter, as guidewires, balloons or as in atherectomy procedures. The low viscosity of CO_{2} makes it easy to pass through small vessels, visualizing tight stenosis, collaterals, small bleedings and endoleaks in AAA procedures.

Expulsion: Once dissolved in the plasma, CO_{2} is transported to the lungs and removed in a single pass by the alveoli, favoring the possibility of performing multiple injections without complications (in healthy patients, meaning no severe COPD or significant POF, especially in presence of pulmonary embolism).

Buoyancy is defined as the tendency of a body to float when submerged into a fluid. CO_{2} is lighter than blood and, therefore, floats above the bloodstream. The main advantage is represented by the simplicity of filling the more superficial (in transverse plane) vessels of the body, conversely the main disadvantage consists in a less ease of filling the deeper ones.

== Side effects ==
Pins and needles/burning sensation, nausea and temporary discomfort are possible sensations during CO_{2} angiography, mainly because the transient ischemia caused by the CO_{2} bubbles flowing in the bloodstream. CO_{2} is also neurotoxic, so brain injections should be avoided. The most feared complication for intravascular use is air embolism, which can result in stroke, myocardial infarction, paralysis, amputation, or death, although this risk across all patients is less than 1%. A large amount of CO_{2} trapped in the pulmonary artery or right side of the heart (only of concern during venography) obstructs venous return resulting in bradycardia and hypotension. The patient should be rotated into a left lateral decubitus position if this happens to attempt to separate the CO_{2} into a gas layer floating "on top of" and no longer interfering with the flow of the liquid and solid components of blood (vapor lock). Therefore, having a delivery system, which prevents air room diffusion, is a necessary safety measure for the patients.
