= Acoustic angiography =

Ultrasound imaging method

A specific branch of contrast-enhanced ultrasound, acoustic angiography is a minimally invasive and non-ionizing medical imaging technique used to visualize vasculature. Acoustic angiography was first developed by the Dayton Laboratory at North Carolina State University and provides a safe, portable, and inexpensive alternative to the most common methods of angiography such as Magnetic Resonance Angiography and Computed Tomography Angiography. Although ultrasound does not traditionally exhibit the high resolution of MRI or CT, high-frequency ultrasound (HFU) achieves relatively high resolution by sacrificing some penetration depth. HFU typically uses waves between 20 and 100 MHz and achieves resolution of 16-80μm at depths of 3-12mm. Although HFU has exhibited adequate resolution to monitor things like tumor growth in the skin layers, on its own it lacks the depth and contrast necessary for imaging blood vessels. Acoustic angiography overcomes the weaknesses of HFU by combining contrast-enhanced ultrasound with the use of a dual-element ultrasound transducer to achieve high resolution visualization of blood vessels at relatively deep penetration levels.

Acoustic angiography is performed by first injecting specially designed microbubbles with a low resonant frequency into the vessels. Next, a low-frequency transducer element with good depth penetration is used to send ultrasound waves into the sample at the resonant frequency of the microbubbles. This will generate a response from the microbubbles consisting of subharmonic, fundamental, and super-harmonic frequencies, as well as a response from the surrounding tissue consisting of only the fundamental and second-harmonic frequencies. Finally, a high-frequency transducer with high resolution is used to measure the super-harmonic frequencies, effectively removing any background signal from the microbubble signal, and allowing the vessels to be visualized

== Background ==
Angiography, or the examination of blood vessels, is essential in many areas of research and clinical practice. In particular, angiography is needed to monitor angiogenesis, which is the growth and development of new blood vessels. Angiogenesis is an essential process which is most often observed in organ growth in fetuses and children, the development of the placenta in adults, and wound healing. However, excessive angiogenesis has been observed in dozens of disorders, including diabetes, endometriosis, autoimmune disease, and asthma. Angiography has been used in the research, diagnosis, and treatment of many of these disorders. Perhaps the most important application of angiography for monitoring angiogenesis is in tumor growth. Tumors can exist for months or even years in a non-angiogeneic stage of development and only begin rapid growth once the angiogenic phenotype is expressed. Thus, angiogenesis has become a target for certain cancer therapies. Some therapies aim to promote organized development of blood vessels in tumor regions, which allows for more homogenous and effective distribution of chemotherapy. Other methods aim to block the start or progression of angiogenesis altogether. In both cases, angiography is essential for measuring the growth, recession, or shape of blood vessels in-vivo over time during these treatments and related research

Currently, the most common techniques used for angiography are X-ray CT and MRI. However, many other methods are used for performing angiography in special circumstances, such as the use of optical coherence tomography for performing angiography during retinal exams. MRI angiography provides the highest resolution of the current angiographic methods and can often be performed without the use of contrast agents by modifying the pulse sequence to visualize aspects of the vessels such as blood flow. On the other hand, x-ray CT angiography requires the use of a contrast agent, but still maintains relatively high resolution. Despite the high quality images produced by both of these techniques, there remain significant drawbacks. Both are relatively slow and require expensive equipment, while x-ray CT also exposes patients to potentially harmful ionizing radiation. Thus, there is still a need for an inexpensive, portable, and safe candidate for angiography. Acoustic angiography is able to fill this need. By using microbubbles as a contrast agent and a dual-element transducer for signal identification, acoustic angiography achieves depth, vessel contrast, and resolution not possible with other ultrasound techniques.

== Ultrasound contrast agents ==
Ultrasound contrast agents are particles used in ultrasound scans to improve image contrast. The first reported use of an ultrasound contrast agent was by Dr. Raymond Gramiak and Pravin Shah in 1968, when they injected saline into the aortic root of the heart and observed increased contrast. They hypothesized that the increase in contrast was a result of "mini bubbles produced by the rapid injection rate or possibly included in the contrast medium". Although most ultrasound contrast agents take the form of microbubbles, other types exist, such as perfluorocarbon nanoparticles or echogenic liposomes.

=== Components ===
Microbubble contrast agents generally have three main components:

1. Inner Gas: The gas inside the microbubble is generally air or a perfluorocarbon.
2. Lipid Shell: This shell serves to enclose the gas within it and is always made of lipids due to their hydrophobic property
3. Ligands: In the case of actively targeted microbubbles, ligands are attached to the outer surface of the lipid shell. These ligands are specific to membrane receptors in the body, and can be used to target certain physiological processes (such as inflammation) or organs. In the case of passively targeted microbubbles, no ligands are attached to the outer shell, and instead the microbubbles rely on factors such as surface charge in order to adhere to the endothelium.

=== Mechanism of contrast ===
Microbubbles work as contrast agents in ultrasound for two main reasons: The large difference in acoustic impedance between body tissues and the microbubbles and their quality of having a resonant frequency generally under 10 MHz. Due to the larger mismatch in acoustic impedances, the microbubbles are near-perfect reflectors of ultrasound waves in the body. This allows them to be point-sources of acoustic waves. Furthermore, at their resonant frequency, the microbubbles have a relatively large-magnitude broadband frequency response, which is picked up by the ultrasound transducer.

== Microbubble signal identification ==
In classical contrast-enhanced ultrasound, many methods exist for separating signal reflected by the microbubbles and signal reflected by surrounding body tissues. Most of these methods utilize the subharmonic and super harmonic response of the microbubbles, as well as the microbubbles nonlinear response to ultrasound waves, as opposed to body tissues linear response to ultrasound waves. Some of the more common filtering methods are listed below.

- Subharmonic filtering: This works by filtering out all signals but the subharmonic signals. Since tissue generally does not have a subharmonic response, only the microbubble signal remains. However, since this filters for the low-frequency signals, the resolution is slightly degraded as spatial resolution in ultrasound is dependent on the acoustic frequency.
- Super harmonic filtering: Similar to subharmonic filtering, this works by filtering all but the super harmonic frequencies, which are mostly emitted by the microbubbles and not surrounding tissue. Unlike subharmonic filtering, the resolution is actually improved since only the high-frequency response is received. However, most clinical transducers do not have the wide bandwidth necessary to be able to accomplish this.
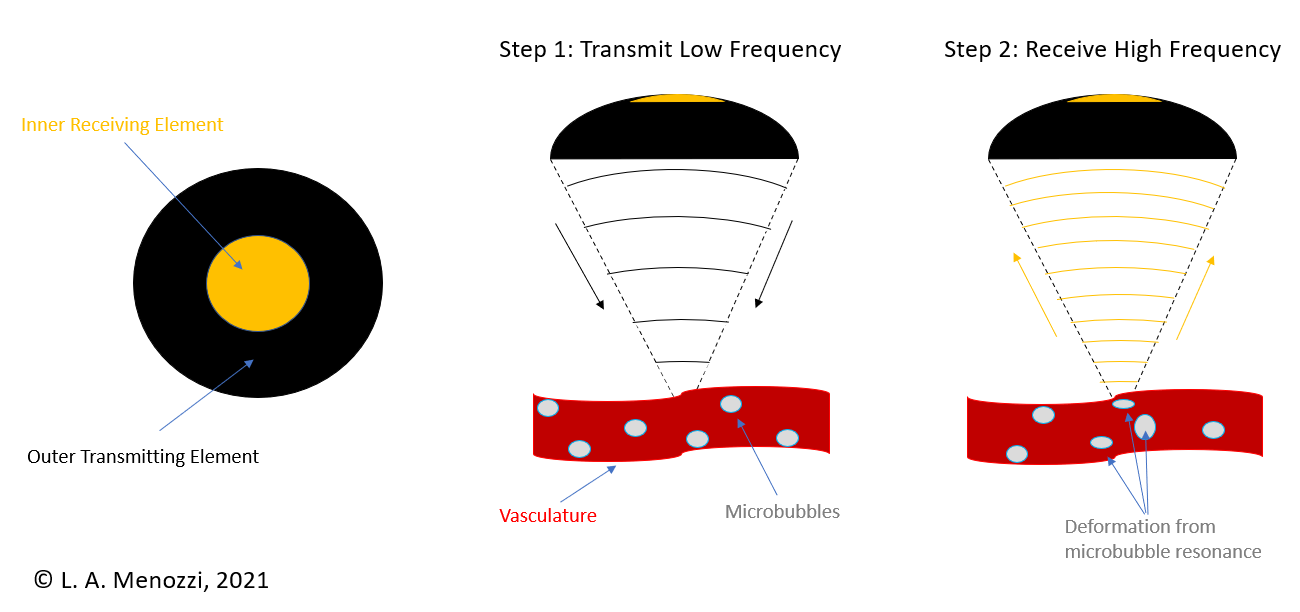
- This shows the fundamental physical process of imaging blood vessel structures in acoustic angiography
  Phase inversion: This filtering method utilizes the characteristically nonlinear response of the microbubbles to ultrasound waves. Here, nonlinear response means that the phase and magnitude of the acoustic wave reflected by the microbubble do not have a linear relationship with the phase and magnitude of the excitatory acoustic wave. In this method, two pulses with opposite phase are emitted by the transducer. The linear response of tissue will cause mostly destructive interference of the opposite-phased waves, while the nonlinear response of microbubbles will allow some signal to pass through.

With the creation of a dual-element transducer, these filtering methods are no longer critical. This is what distinguishes acoustic angiography from the more generic contrast-enhanced ultrasound. An element centered at a low frequency serves to excite the microbubbles at their resonant frequency, while an element centered at a high frequency receives the super harmonic response of the microbubbles. Since the tissue is excited by the low frequency input and does not produce a high frequency response, the only response received by the dual-element transducer is that originating from the microbubbles. Thus, little to no signal processing is necessary to remove tissue signal from the acquired data.

Because the inner element is receive only while the outer element is transmit only, special materials can be chosen to optimize the efficiency and sensitivity of this process. Lead Zirconate Titanate (PZT) works well as a material choice for the transmitting element because it has a high transmitting constant (d = 300 x 10^-12 m/V) while Polyvinylidene Fluoride (PVDF) works well as a material for the receiving element because it has a high receiving constant (g = 14 x 10^-2 Vm/N). Generally, PVDF is not a good choice for an ultrasound transducer because it has a relatively poor transmitting constant, however, since acoustic angiography separates the transmitting and receiving elements, this is no longer an issue.

== Image formation ==
=== Data acquisition ===
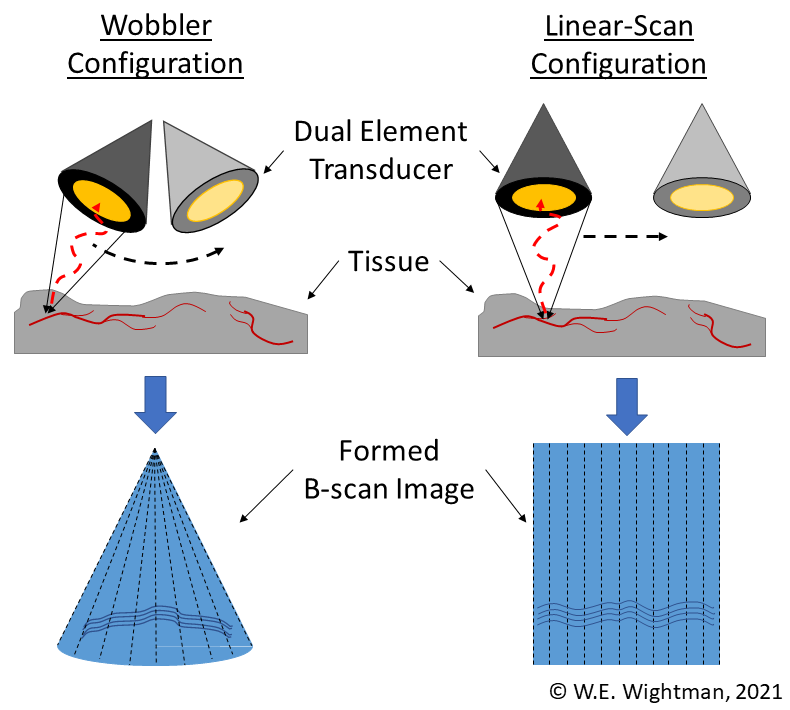
Wobbler vs Linear Sweep Mechanical Scanning Configurations

As acoustic angiography uses a dual-element ultrasonic transducer in the format of a focused ultrasound probe, it is not feasible to form an array of transducers as can be done in other forms of ultrasound imagining. Thus acoustic angiography images are formed by combining multiple a-mode images where each a-mode is a one-dimensional image identifying the acoustic boundaries along a vector originating at the transducer.

In order to form two or three dimensional images, the position and angle of the transducer and the resulting a-mode image must be mechanically manipulated. Two common configurations used to acquire these a-mode images include the wobbler configuration and mechanical sweep configuration.

In the wobbler configuration, the probe is rotated back and forth about a central axis in one plane so that the a-scans are radially oriented and the field of view, or region that is able to be imaged, is a cone. This allows for very quick acquisition of a-scans, but has nonhomogeneous resolution as the distance between each point on neighboring a-scans increases with depth.

In the linear sweep configuration, the ultrasound probe is mechanically moved, either by an external mechanism or hand, in a direction orthogonal to the direction of the a-scan. This configuration allows relatively consistent resolution as a function of depth as each point on neighboring a-scans is equidistant.

Once data has been collected as described above, it can be processed to form a variety of image types including projections and volumetric reconstruction.

=== Projection ===
Projection images in ultrasound are similar in concept to projection radiography. However, instead of projecting the degree of absorbance of X-ray photons along a given path, projection images in ultrasound generally project the mismatch of acoustic impedance and the location along a given boundary in tissue.

==== Maximum amplitude projection ====
The maximum amplitude projection or the maximum intensity projection is an image processing technique used to project three dimensional data onto a two dimensional image. This is a valuable tool as it allows the complex data to be formed into more readily understandable images that include the perception of depth.

In many forms of ultrasound imaging and photoacoustic imaging, the maximum amplitude of the signal along a given a-scan is used as the value for a pixel associated with that a-scan. As acoustic wave experience distance-dependent acoustic attenuation, the amplitude of a given signal along a given a-scan also encodes the distance to the object that generated that signal.

This simple image reconstruction technique allows for easily formed and interpretable projection images formed from acoustic signals.

==== Volumetric renderings ====
Volumetric renderings convert volumetric data into projection images. Most methods use data acquired in lower dimensions to generate voxels, volumetric pixels, that can form 3D images when combined.

=== Volumetric reconstruction ===
Volume reconstruction techniques are used to convert multiple 1D or 2D images into 3D volumes. Common volume reconstruction techniques include pixel-nearest-neighbors, voxel-nearest-neighbors, distance-weighted voxels, and function based methods used to statistically infer the value of a given voxel.

== Applications ==
As acoustic angiography is currently under development, this specific branch of contrast-enhanced ultrasound is not currently used in clinical settings. The majority of the previous work using acoustic angiography has studied angiogenesis in animal models for research purposes.

Though the FDA has only approved contrast-enhanced ultrasound use in one clinical application in the United States, echocardiography, the broader technique has been used throughout Europe and Asia to great success in a variety of clinical applications. To learn more, see the current applications of contrast enhanced ultrasound.

=== Currently investigated clinical uses ===
The only use of acoustic angiography that has been investigated in clinical settings to date studied angiogenesis in the peripheral vasculature of human breast tissue. This study investigated if acoustic angiography could be used to reduce the need for biopsy of breast tissue when diagnosing if lesions in breast tissue were cancerous or not.

Using acoustic angiography, the authors collected and reconstructed the 3D volumes associated with vasculature surrounding lesions in the breast. These reconstructed volumes were then analyzed for vascular density and tortuosity. This information is useful for diagnosis as it has been shown that when these two factors increase in the vasculature surrounding a lesion, there is an increased risk that the lesion is cancerous.
