= Lucien Campeau =

- Born: June 20, 1927; Sudbury, Ontario, Canada
- Died: March 15, 2010; Ste-Agathe, Québec, Canada
- Occupation: Cardiologist
- Employer(s): Montreal Heart Institute, Université de Montréal

Lucien Campeau (June 20, 1927 – March 15, 2010) was a Canadian cardiologist. He was a full professor at the Université de Montréal. He is best known for performing the world's first transradial coronary angiogram. Campeau was one of the founding staff of the Montreal Heart Institute, joining in 1957. He is also well known for developing the Canadian Cardiovascular Society grading of angina pectoris.

== Education ==
Campeau received his M.D. degree from the University of Laval in 1953 and completed a fellowship in Cardiology at Johns Hopkins Hospital from 1956 to 1957. He later became a professor at University of Montreal in 1961 and was one of the co-founders of the Montreal Heart Institute.

In his lifetime, Campeau was awarded the Research Achievement Award of the Canadian Cardiovascular Society. In 2004, he was named “Cardiologue émérite 2004” by the Association des cardiologues du Québec.
