= Digital subtraction angiography =

Method for delineating blood vessels using contrast medium

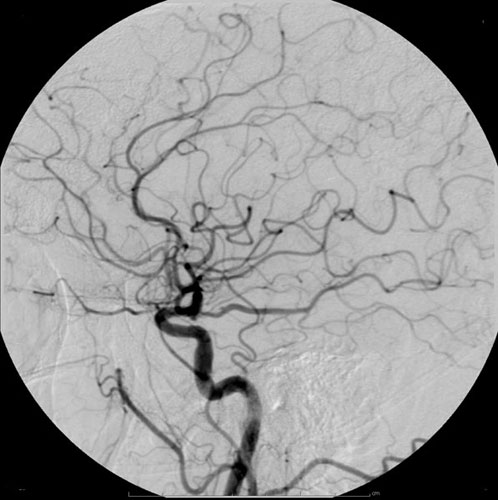
- Example of iodine-based contrast in cerebral angiography
- MeSH: D015901

Digital subtraction angiography (DSA) is a fluoroscopy technique used in interventional radiology to clearly visualize blood vessels in a bony or dense soft tissue environment. Images are produced using contrast medium by subtracting a "pre-contrast image", or mask, from subsequent images once the contrast medium has been introduced into a structure (hence the term "digital subtraction angiography"). Subtraction angiography was first described in 1935, and in 1962, it was described in English sources as a manual technique. Digital technology made DSA practical starting in the 1970s.

== Procedure ==
=== DSA and fluoroscopy ===
In traditional angiography, images are acquired by exposing an area of interest with time-controlled x-rays while injecting a contrast medium into the blood vessels. The image obtained includes the blood vessels, together with all overlying and underlying structures. The images are useful for determining anatomical position and variations, but unhelpful for visualizing blood vessels accurately.

In order to remove the distracting structures to see the vessels better, first a mask image is acquired. The mask image is simply an image of the same area before the contrast is administered. The radiological equipment used to capture this is usually an X-ray image intensifier, which then keeps producing images of the same area at a set rate (1 to 7.5 frames per second). Each subsequent image gets the original "mask" image subtracted out. (Mathematically, the incoming image is divided by the mask image) The radiologist controls how much contrast media is injected and for how long. Smaller structures require less contrast to fill the vessel than others. Images produced appear with a very pale grey background, which produces a high contrast to the blood vessels, which appear a very dark grey.

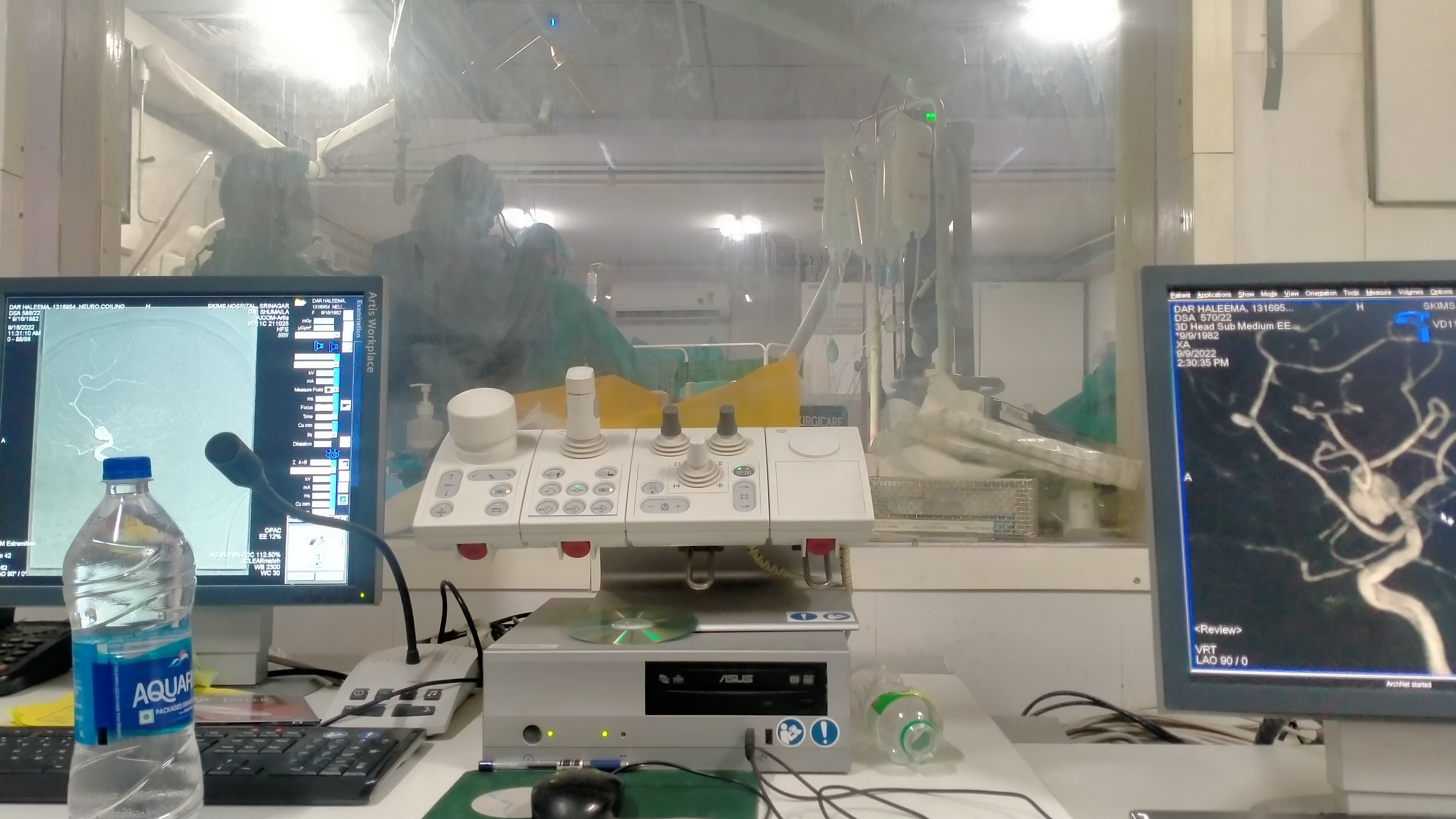
Neuro Coiling Procedure

=== Intravenous digital subtraction angiography ===
Intravenous digital subtraction angiography (IV-DSA) is a form of angiography which was first developed in the late 1970s.

IV-DSA is a computer technique that compares an X-ray image of a region of the body before and after radiopaque iodine based dye has been injected intravenously into the body. Tissues and blood vessels on the first image are digitally subtracted from the second image, leaving a clear picture of the artery which can then be studied independently and in isolation from the rest of the body.

Some limited studies have indicated that IV-DSA is not suitable for patients with diabetes or kidney failure because the dye load is significantly higher than that used in arteriography. However, IV-DSA has been used successfully to study the vessels of the brain and heart and has helped detect carotid artery obstruction and to map patterns of cerebral blood flow. It also helps detect and diagnose lesions in the carotid arteries, a potential cause of strokes.

IV-DSA has also been useful in assessing patients prior to surgery and after coronary artery bypass surgery and some transplant operations.

== Applications ==
DSA is primarily used to image blood vessels. It is useful in the diagnosis and treatment of arterial and venous occlusions, including carotid artery stenosis, pulmonary embolisms, and acute limb ischaemia; arterial stenosis, which is particularly useful for potential kidney donors in detecting renal artery stenosis (DSA is the gold standard investigation for renal artery stenosis); cerebral aneurysms and arteriovenous malformations (AVM).

== The future ==
DSA is done less routinely in imaging departments. It is being replaced by computed tomography angiography (CTA), which can produce 3D images through a test which is less invasive and stressful for the patient, and magnetic resonance angiography (MRA), which avoids X-rays and nephrotoxic contrast agents.

== See also ==
- Angiography
- Computed tomography angiography (CTA)
- Contrast medium
- Peripheral artery disease
- X-ray image intensifier
- Digital variance angiography (DVA)
