= Angiography =

Medical imaging technique

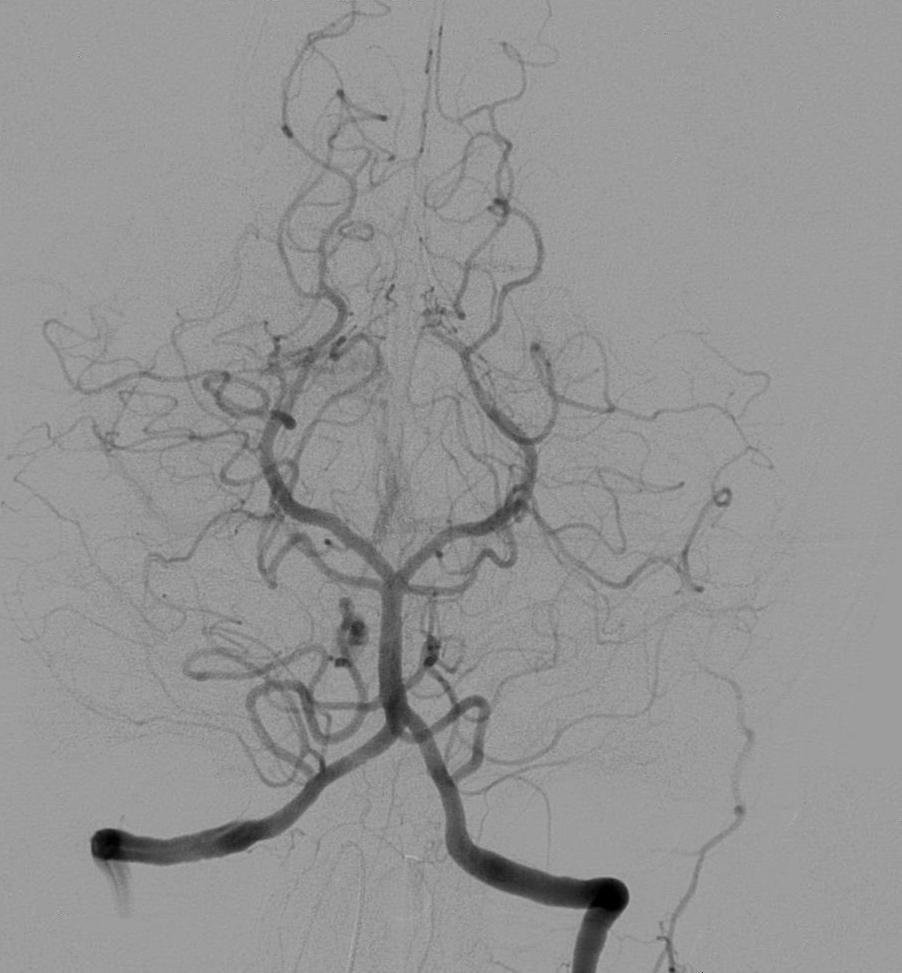
- Angiogram of the brain showing a transverse projection of the vertebro basilar and posterior cerebral circulation.
- Specialty: Radiology, interventional radiology
- ICD-9-CM: 88.40-88.68
- MeSH: D000792
- OPS-301 code: 3–60

Angiography or arteriography is a medical imaging technique used to visualize the inside, or lumen, of blood vessels and organs of the body, with particular interest in the arteries, veins, and the heart chambers. Modern angiography is performed by injecting a radio-opaque contrast agent into the blood vessel and imaging using X-ray based techniques such as fluoroscopy. With time-of-flight (TOF) magnetic resonance it is no longer necessary to use a contrast.

The word itself comes from the Greek words ἀγγεῖον angeion 'vessel' and γράφειν graphein 'to write, record'. The film or image of the blood vessels is called an angiograph, or more commonly an angiogram. Though the word can describe both an arteriogram and a venogram, in everyday usage the terms angiogram and arteriogram are often used synonymously, whereas the term venogram is used more precisely.

The term angiography has been applied to radionuclide angiography and newer vascular imaging techniques such as CO_{2} angiography, CT angiography and MR angiography. The term isotope angiography has also been used, although this more correctly is referred to as isotope perfusion scanning.

== History ==
Renal artery angiography video

The technique was first developed in 1927 by the Portuguese physician and neurologist Egas Moniz at the University of Lisbon to provide contrasted X-ray cerebral angiography in order to diagnose several kinds of nervous diseases, such as tumors, artery disease and arteriovenous malformations. Moniz is recognized as the pioneer in this field. He performed the first cerebral angiogram in Lisbon in 1927, and Reynaldo dos Santos performed the first aortogram in the same city in 1929. In fact, many current angiography techniques were developed by the Portuguese at the University of Lisbon. For example, in 1932, Lopo de Carvalho performed the first pulmonary angiogram via venous puncture of the superior member. In 1948 the first cavogram was performed by Sousa Pereira. With the introduction of the Seldinger technique in 1953, the procedure became markedly safer as no sharp introductory devices needed to remain inside the vascular lumen. Radial access technique for angiography can be traced back to 1989, when Lucien Campeau first cannulated the radial artery to perform a coronary angiogram.

== Technique ==
Depending on the type of angiogram, access to the blood vessels is gained most commonly through the femoral artery, to look at the left side of the heart and at the arterial system; or the jugular or femoral vein, to look at the right side of the heart and at the venous system. Using a system of guide wires and catheters, a type of contrast agent (which shows up by absorbing the X-rays), is added to the blood to make it visible on the X-ray images.

The X-ray images taken may either be still, displayed on an image intensifier or film, or motion images. For all structures except the heart, the images are usually taken using a technique called digital subtraction angiography or DSA. Images in this case are usually taken at 2–3 frames per second, which allows the interventional radiologist to evaluate the flow of the blood through a vessel or vessels. This technique "subtracts" the bones and other organs so only the vessels filled with contrast agent can be seen. The heart images are taken at 15–30 frames per second, not using a subtraction technique. Because DSA requires the patient to remain motionless, it cannot be used on the heart. Both these techniques enable the interventional radiologist or cardiologist to see stenosis (blockages or narrowings) inside the vessel which may be inhibiting the flow of blood and causing pain.

After the procedure has been completed, if the femoral technique is applied, the site of arterial entry is either manually compressed, stapled shut, or sutured in order to prevent access-site complications.

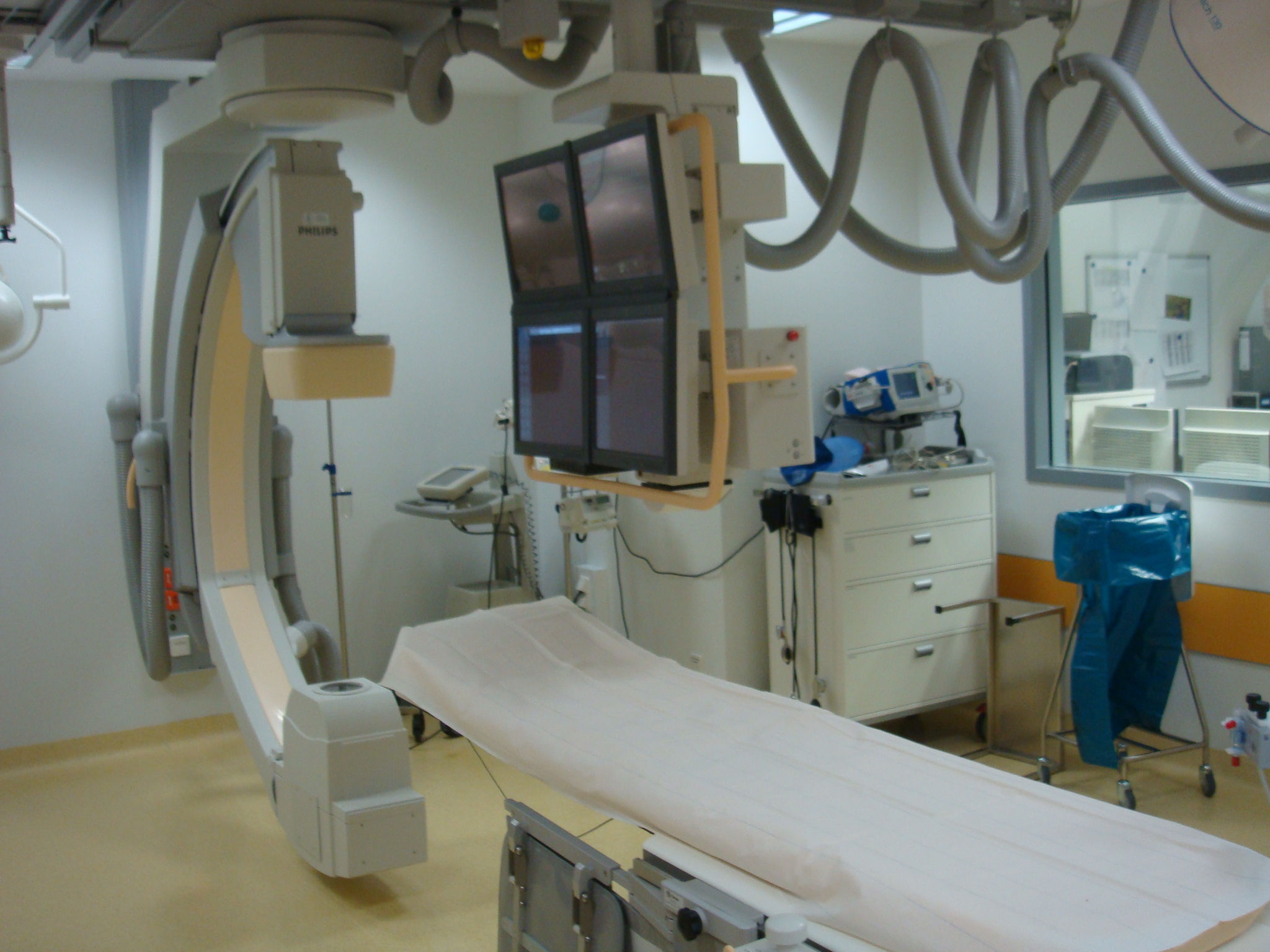
Catheterization Lab

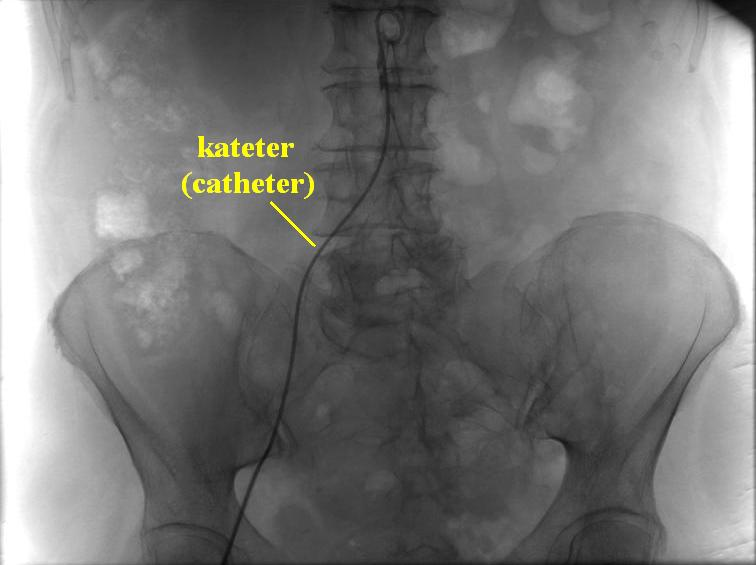
Catheterization in selective angiography

== Uses ==
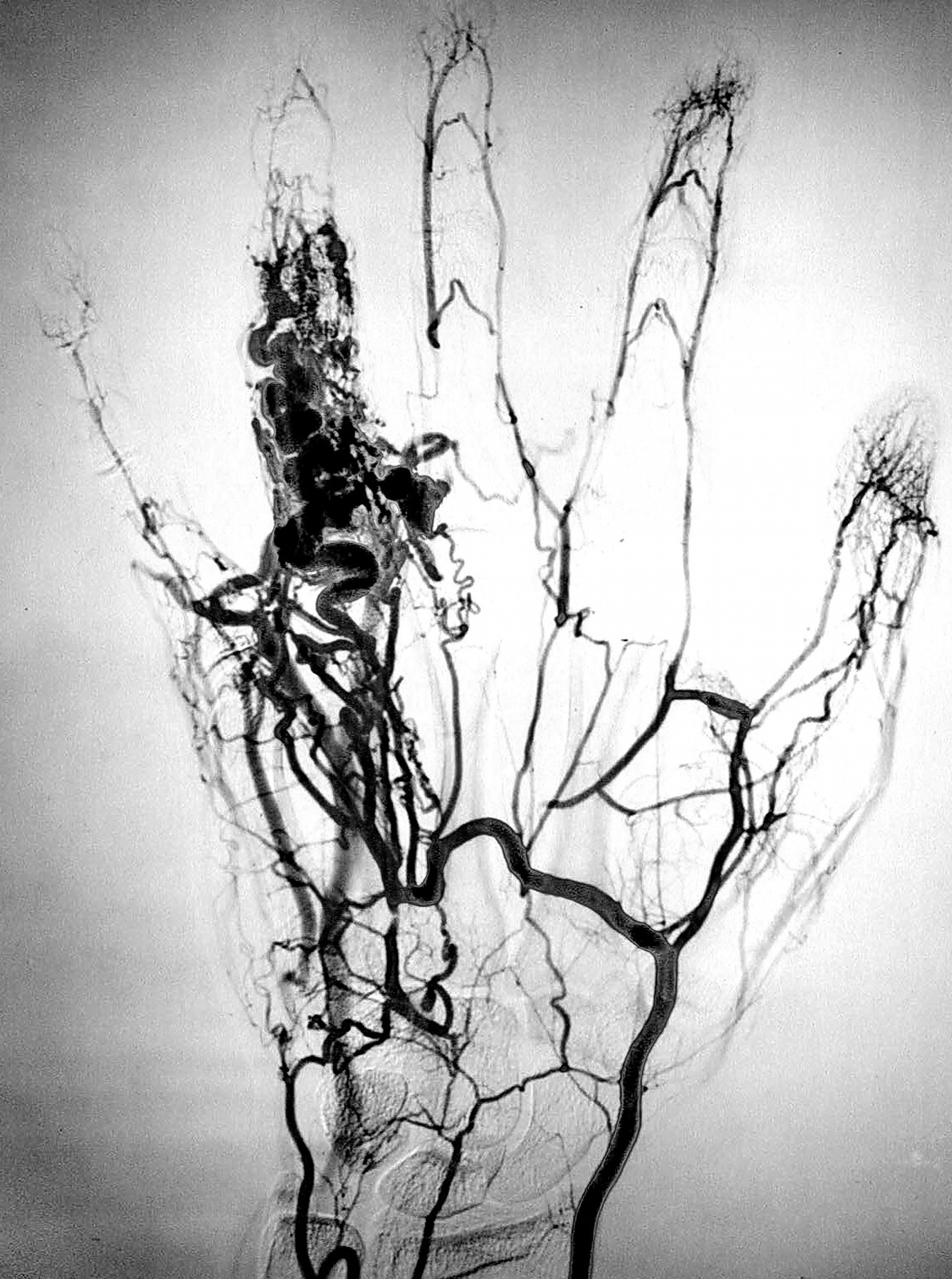
Finger angioma seen on angiogram

=== Coronary angiography ===
One of the most common angiograms performed is to visualize the coronary arteries. A long, thin, flexible tube called a catheter is used to administer the X-ray contrast agent at the desired area to be visualized. The catheter is threaded into an artery in the forearm, and the tip is advanced through the arterial system into the major coronary artery. X-ray images of the transient radiocontrast distribution within the blood flowing inside the coronary arteries allows visualization of the size of the artery openings. The presence or absence of atherosclerosis or atheroma within the walls of the arteries cannot be clearly determined.

Coronary angiography can visualize coronary artery stenosis, or narrowing of the blood vessel. The degree of stenosis can be determined by comparing the width of the lumen of narrowed segments of blood vessel with wider segments of adjacent vessel.

The coronary angiography is performed under local anaesthesia. The patient is awake during the procedure. An incision is made in the groin, wrist, or arm, and a catheter is inserted into the artery through it. An X-ray is used to guide the catheter to the area of blockage. A dye is inserted through the catheter to make the places of blockage visible.

When the catheter is in position, a thin wire with a balloon is guided to the place of blockage. The balloon is inflated to widen the artery, allowing the blood to flow freely. Often, a stent is used, and as the balloon is inflated, the stent in place expands and holds open the artery. The balloon is then deflated and removed, leaving the stent in place.

After the completion of the procedure, the catheter is removed, and the plug area is sealed using angio-seal.

The procedure takes around two hours, and the patient can be discharged after an overnight stay in the hospital, depending on the condition.

=== Cerebral angiography ===
Cerebral angiography provides images of blood vessels in and around the brain to detect abnormalities, including arteriovenous malformations and aneurysms. One common cerebral angiographic procedure is neuro-vascular digital subtraction angiography.

=== Pulmonary angiography ===
Pulmonary angiography is used to visualise the anatomy of pulmonary vessels. Pulmonary angiography may be used during embolization of pulmonary arteriovenous malformations. In addition, pulmonary angiography may be performed during treatment of pulmonary embolisms.

=== Peripheral angiography ===
Angiography is also commonly performed to identify vessels narrowing in patients with leg claudication or cramps, caused by reduced blood flow down the legs and to the feet; in patients with renal stenosis (which commonly causes high blood pressure) and can be used in the head to find and repair stroke. These are all done routinely through the femoral artery, but can also be performed through the brachial or axillary (arm) artery. Any stenoses found may be treated by the use of balloon angioplasty, stenting, or atherectomy.

=== Visceral angiography ===
A common indication for angiography is to evaluate and guide treatment for internal (e.g. gastrointestinal) bleeding. Angiography may also be used during hemorrhoidal artery embolization for treatment of symptomatic hemorrhoids.

=== Fluorescein angiography ===
Fluorescein angiography is a medical procedure in which a fluorescent dye is injected into the bloodstream. The dye highlights the blood vessels in the back of the eye so they can be photographed. This test is often used to manage eye disorders.

=== OCT angiography ===
Optical coherence tomography (OCT) is a technology using near-infrared light to image the eye, in particular penetrate the retina to view the micro-structure behind the retinal surface. Ocular OCT angiography (OCTA) is a method leveraging OCT technology to assess the vascular health of the retina.

=== Microangiography ===
Microangiography is commonly used to visualize tiny blood vessels.

=== Post mortem CT angiography ===
Post mortem CT angiography for medicolegal cases is a method initially developed by a virtopsy group. Originating from that project, both watery and oily solutions have been evaluated.

While oily solutions require special deposition equipment to collect waste water, watery solutions seem to be regarded as less problematic. Watery solutions also were documented to enhance post mortem CT tissue differentiation whereas oily solutions were not. Conversely, oily solutions seem to only minimally disturb ensuing toxicological analysis, while watery solutions may significantly impede toxicological analysis, thus requiring blood sample preservation before post mortem CT angiography.

== Complications ==
Angiography is a relatively safe procedure. But it does have some minor and very few major complications. After an angiogram, a sudden shock can cause a little pain at the surgery area, but heart attacks and strokes usually do not occur, as they may in bypass surgery. The risk of complications from angiography can be reduced with a prior CT scan by providing clinicians with more information about number and positioning of the clots in advance.

=== Cerebral angiography ===
Major complications in cerebral angiography such as in digital subtraction angiography or contrast MRI are also rare but include stroke, an allergic reaction to the anaesthetic other medication or the contrast medium, blockage or damage to one of the access veins in the leg, pseudoaneurysm at the puncture site; or thrombosis and embolism formation. Bleeding or bruising at the site where the contrast is injected are minor complications, delayed bleeding can also occur but is rare.

=== Additional risks ===
The contrast medium that is used usually produces a sensation of warmth lasting only a few seconds, but may be felt in a greater degree in the area of injection. If the patient is allergic to the contrast medium, much more serious side effects are inevitable; however, with new contrast agents the risk of a severe reaction is less than one in 80,000 examinations. Additionally, damage to blood vessels can occur at the site of puncture/injection, and anywhere along the vessel during passage of the catheter. If digital subtraction angiography is used instead, the risks are considerably reduced because the catheter does not need to be passed as far into the blood vessels; thus lessening the chances of damage or blockage.

=== Infection ===
Antibiotic prophylaxis may be given in those procedures that are not clean, or clean procedures that results in generation of infarcted or necrotic tissues such as embolisation. Routine diagnostic angiography is often considered a clean procedure. Prophylaxis is also given to prevent infection from infected space into blood stream.

=== Thrombosis ===
There are six risk factors causing thrombosis after arterial puncture: low blood pressure, small arterial diameter, multiple puncture tries, long duration of cannulation, administration of vasopressor/inotropic agents, and the usage of catheters with side holes.

== See also ==
- Acoustic angiography
- Angiosarcoma
- Cardiac catheterization
- Computed tomography angiography
- Contrast medium
- Echocardiogram
- Electrocardiogram
- Fluorescein angiography
- Image intensifier
- Interventional radiology
- Intravascular ultrasound
- Intravenous digital subtraction angiography
- Magnetic resonance angiography
- Peripheral artery occlusive disease
