= Microbubble =

Microbubbles are bubbles smaller than one hundredth of a millimetre in diameter, but larger than one micrometre. They have widespread application in industry, medicine, life science, and food technology. The composition of the bubble shell and filling material determine important design features such as buoyancy, crush strength, thermal conductivity, and acoustic properties.

They are used in medical diagnostics as a contrast agent for ultrasound imaging. The gas-filled microbubbles, typically air or perfluorocarbon, oscillate, and vibrate if a sonic energy field is applied and may reflect ultrasound waves. This distinguishes the microbubbles from surrounding tissues. Because gas bubbles in liquid lack stability and would therefore quickly dissolve, microbubbles are typically encapsulated by shells. The shell is made from elastic, viscoelastic, or viscous material. Common shell materials are lipid, albumin, and protein. Materials having a hydrophilic outer layer to interact with the bloodstream and a hydrophobic inner layer to house the gas molecules are thermodynamically stable. Air, sulfur hexafluoride, and perfluorocarbon gases all can serve as the composition of the microbubble interior. Microbubbles with one or more incompressible liquid or solid cores surrounded by gas are referred to as microscopic or endoskeletal antibubbles. For increased stability and persistence in the bloodstream, gases with high molecular weight as well as low solubility in the blood are attractive candidates for microbubble gas cores.

Microbubbles may be used for drug delivery, biofilm removal, membrane cleaning /biofilm control and water/waste water treatment purposes. They are also produced by the movement of a ship's hull through water, creating a bubble layer; this may interfere with the use of sonar because of the tendency of the layer to absorb or reflect sound waves.

== Acoustic response ==
Contrast in ultrasound imaging relies on the difference in acoustic impedance, a function of both the speed of the ultrasound wave and the density of the tissues, between tissues or regions of interest. As the sound waves induced by ultrasound interact with a tissue interface, some of the waves are reflected back to the transducer. The larger the difference, the more waves are reflected, and the higher the signal to noise ratio. Hence, microbubbles that have a core with a density orders of magnitude lower than and compress more readily than the surrounding tissues and blood, afford high contrast in imaging.

== Therapeutic application ==
=== Physical Response ===
When exposed to ultrasound, microbubbles oscillate in response to the incoming pressure waves in one of two ways. With lower pressures, higher frequencies, and larger microbubble diameter, microbubbles oscillate, or cavitate, stably. This causes microstreaming near the surrounding vasculature and tissues, inducing shear stresses that can create pores on the endothelial layer. This pore formation enhances endocytosis and permeability. At lower frequencies, higher pressures, and lower microbubble diameter, microbubbles oscillate inertially; they expand and contract violently, ultimately leading to microbubble collapse. This phenomenon can create mechanical stresses and microjets along the vascular wall, which has been shown to disrupt tight cellular junctions as well as induce cellular permeability. Extremely high pressures cause small vessel destruction, but the pressure can be tuned to only create transient pores in vivo. microbubble destruction serves as a desirable method for drug delivery vehicles. The resulting force from destruction can dislodge the therapeutic payload present on the microbubble and simultaneously sensitize the surrounding cells for drug uptake.

=== Drug Delivery ===
Microbubbles can serve as drug delivery vehicles in a variety of methods. The most notable of these include: (1) incorporating a lipophilic drug to the lipid monolayer, (2) attaching nanoparticles and liposomes to the microbubble surface, (3) enveloping the microbubble within a larger liposome, and (4) electrostatically bonding nucleic acids to the microbubble surface.

==== I. Lipophilic Drugs ====
Microbubbles can facilitate the local targeting of hydrophobic drugs through the incorporation of these agents into the microbubble lipid shell. This encapsulation technique reduces systemic toxicity, increases drug localization, and improves the solubility of hydrophobic drugs. For increased localization, a targeting ligand can be appended to the exterior of the microbubble. This improves treatment efficacy. One drawback of the lipid-encapsulated microbubble as a drug delivery vehicle is its low payload efficacy. To combat this, an oil shell can be incorporated to the interior of the lipid monolayer to enhance payload efficacy.

==== II. Nanoparticle and Liposome Attachment ====
Attachment of liposomes or nanoparticles to the exterior of the lipid microbubble has also been explored to increase microbubble payload. Upon microbubble destruction with ultrasound, these smaller particles can extravasate into the tumor tissue. Furthermore, through attachment of these particles to microbubbles as opposed to co-injection, the drug is confined to the blood stream instead of accumulating in healthy tissues, and the treatment is relegated to the location of ultrasound therapy. This microbubble modification is particularly attractive for Doxil, a lipid formulation of Doxorubicin already in clinical use. An analysis of nanoparticle infiltration due to microbubble destruction indicates that higher pressures are necessary for vascular permeability and likely improves treatment by promoting local fluid movement and enhancing endocytosis.

==== III. Microbubble Loading Inside Liposome ====
Another novel acoustically responsive microbubble system is the direct encapsulation of microbubbles inside of a liposome. Theses systems circulate longer in the body than microbubbles alone do, as this packaging method prevents the microbubble from dissolving in the blood stream. Hydrophilic drugs persist in the aqueous media inside the liposome, while hydrophobic drugs congregate in the lipid bilayer. It has been shown in vitro that macrophages do not engulf these particles.

==== IV. Gene Delivery through Electrostatic Interactions ====
Microbubbles also serve a non-viral vector for gene transfection through electrostatic bonds between a positively charged microbubble outer shell and negatively charged nucleic acids. The transient pores formed by microbubble collapse allow the genetic material to pass into the target cells in a safer and more specific manner than current treatment methods. Microbubbles have been used to deliver microRNAs, plasmids, small interfering RNA, and messenger RNA.

==== Disadvantages of Microbubbles for Drug Delivery ====
- Microbubbles do not extravasate easily due to their large size, and hence their effects are relegated to the vasculature. Nanodroplets, perfluorocarbon liquid droplets surrounded by a lipid shell that vaporize due to an ultrasound pulse, offer a small diameter to promote extravasation and afford an alternative to microbubbles.
- Microbubbles have short half-lives on the order of minutes in circulation, which limits the treatment time.
- Microbubbles are filtered by the liver and spleen, and any drug conjugation would then also potentially pose a toxicity threat to these organs, should the microbubbles not have already released their cargo.
- Drug conjugations to microbubbles are complicated for translation, and these formulations would be difficult to scale up for widespread use.
- There can be a small amount hemorrhage into brain tissue when microbubbles are used to disrupt the blood brain barrier, though this is thought to be reversible.

=== Unique Applications of Microbubbles for Therapeutic Application ===
Microbubbles used for drug delivery not only serve as drug vehicles but also as a means to permeate otherwise impenetrable barriers, specifically the blood brain barrier, and to alter the tumor microenvironment.

==== I. Blood Brain Barrier Disruption ====
The brain is protected by tight junctions in the endothelial cell wall in the capillaries, known as the blood-brain barrier (BBB). The BBB strictly regulates what passes into the brain from the blood, and while this function is highly desirable in healthy individuals, it also poses a barrier for therapeutics to enter the brain for cancer patients. Ultrasound was shown to disrupt the blood brain barrier in the mid 20th century, and in the early 2000's, microbubbles were shown to assist in a temporary permeabilization. Since then, ultrasound and microbubble therapy has been used to deliver therapeutics to the brain. As BBB disruption with ultrasound and microbubble treatment has shown to be a safe and promising treatment pre-clinically, two clinical trials are testing delivery of doxorubicin and carboplatin with microbubbles to increase drug concentration locally.

==== II. Immunotherapy ====
In addition to permeating the blood brain barrier, ultrasound and microbubble therapy can alter the tumor environment and serve as an immunotherapeutic treatment. High-intensity focused ultrasound (HIFU) alone triggers an immune response, speculated to be through facilitating the release of tumor antigens for immune cell recognition, activating antigen-presenting cells and promoting their infiltration, combatting tumor immunosuppression, and promoting a Th1 cell response. Typically, HIFU is used for thermal ablation of tumors. Low-intensity focused ultrasound (LIFU) in combination with microbubbles has also shown to stimulate immunostimulatory effects, inhibiting tumor growth and increasing endogenous leukocyte infiltration. Furthermore, lowering the acoustic power required for HIFU yields a safer treatment for the patient, as well as diminished treatment time. Though the treatment itself shows potential, a combinatorial treatment is speculated to be required for a complete treatment. Ultrasound and microbubble treatment without additional drugs impeded the growth of small tumors but required a combinatorial drug treatment to affect medium-sized tumor growth. With their immune stimulating mechanism, ultrasound and microbubbles offer a unique ability to prime or enhance immunotherapies for more effective cancer treatment.

== Water and wastewater treatment ==
Microbubbles have been investigated as an aeration technology for water and wastewater treatment, where their long residence time, high specific surface area, and capacity to generate reactive oxygen species can improve gas-transfer efficiency and contaminant removal compared with conventional diffused aeration. Reviews of microbubble and nanobubble aeration have reported improvements in dissolved oxygen levels and biological oxygen demand removal in activated sludge processes when these technologies are applied in place of conventional aeration.

== Aquaculture ==
In aquaculture, microbubble aerators have been used to maintain elevated dissolved oxygen concentrations in fish and shrimp culture systems. Studies have reported improved fish growth performance, reduced stress, and altered microbial community composition in pond and recirculating aquaculture systems treated with microbubble or nanobubble aeration compared with conventional aeration.
