= List of drugs: Im–In =

This multi-page article lists pharmaceutical drugs alphabetically by name. Many drugs have more than one name and, therefore, the same drug may be listed more than once. Brand names and generic names are differentiated by capitalizing brand names.

See also the list of the top 100 bestselling branded drugs, ranked by sales.

Abbreviations are used in the list as follows:

- INN = International nonproprietary name
- BAN = British Approved Name
- USAN = United States Adopted Name
- Two-letter codes for countries

Lists of drugs
1–9 | A | B | C | D | E | F | G | H | I | J | K | L | M | N | O | P | Q | R | S | T | U | V | W | X | Y | Z

Ia–Il | Im–In | Io–Ip | Iq–Iz

== im ==
=== ima-imf ===
- Imaavy
- imafen (INN)
- imagabalin (USAN, INN)
- Imagent
- imanixil (INN)
- imatinib mesylate (INN)
- imazodan (INN)
- imcarbofos (INN)
- imciromab (INN)
- Imdelltra
- Imdur
- Imdylltra
- imecasermin (INN)
- imeglimin (INN)
- imelasomeran (INN)
- imepitoin (INN)
- imetelstat (USAN, INN)
- imexon (INN)
- Imfinzi

=== imi-imr ===
- imiclopazine (INN)
- imidafenacin (INN)
- imidapril (INN)
- imidaprilat (INN)
- imidazole salicylate (INN)
- imidocarb (INN)
- imidoline (INN)
- imiglucerase (INN)
- imiloxan (INN)
- iminophenimide (INN)
- imipenem (INN)
- imipramine (INN)
- imipraminoxide (INN)
- imiquimod (INN)
- imirestat (INN)
- imisopasem manganese (USAN, INN)
- Imitrex
- imitrodast (INN)
- imlunestrant (USAN, INN)
- Imlygic
- intravenous human
- Immgolis
- Immgolis Intri
- immune globulin intravenous human-ifas
- immune globulin intravenous human-kthm
- immune globulin intravenous human-slra
- immune globulin subcutaneous human
- immune globulin subcutaneous human-hipp
- immune globulin subcutaneous human-klhw
- Imodium
- imolamine (INN)
- imoxiterol (INN)
- impacarzine (INN)
- impromidine (INN)
- improsulfan (INN)
- Imraldi
- Imreplys

=== imu ===
- Imuldosa
- imuracetam (INN)
- Imuran

== in ==
=== ina-inc ===
- inakalant (INN)
- inalimarev (USAN)
- inaperisone (INN)
- Inapsine
- inavolisib (INN)
- inbakicept (INN)
- incadronic acid (INN)
- Incellipan
- incobotulinumtoxinA (USAN)
- incyclinide (USAN, INN)

=== ind ===
==== inda-indi ====
- indacaterol (USAN)
- indacrinone (INN)
- Indahexal (Hexal Australia) [Au]. Redirects to indapamide.
- indalpine (INN)
- indanazoline (INN)
- indanidine (INN)
- indanorex (INN)
- indantadol (INN)
- indapamide (INN)
- indatraline (INN)
- indecainide (INN)
- indeglitazar (INN)
- indeloxazine (INN)
- indenolol (INN)
- Inderal
- Inderide (Pfizer)
- indibulin (USAN)
- Indimacis-125
- indinavir (INN)
- indiplon (USAN)
- indisetron (INN)
- indisulam (USAN)
- indium (111In) altumomab pentetate (INN)
- indium (111In) biciromab (INN)
- indium (111In) capromab pendetide (INN)
- indium (111In) igovomab (INN)
- indium (111In) imciromab (INN)
- indium (111In) satumomab pendetide (INN)

==== indo-indr ====
- Indo-Lemmon
- indobufen (INN)
- indocate (INN)
- Indocin
- indolapril (INN)
- indolidan (INN)
- indometacin (INN)
- indomethacin (INN)
- Indomethegan
- indopanolol (INN)
- indopine (INN)
- indoprofen (INN)
- indoramin (INN)
- indorenate (INN)
- indoxole (INN)
- indriline (INN)

=== inf-ino ===
- Infants' Feverall
- Infasurf Preservative Free
- Infed
- Infilbray
- Inflamase Forte
- Inflamase Mild
- infliximab (INN)
- Infumorph
- Infuvite
- ingenol mebutate (USAN, INN)
- INH
- inicarone (INN)
- iniparib (USAN)
- Injectapap
- Inluriyo
- Innofem
- Innohep
- Innopran XL
- Innovar
- Inocor
- inocoterone (INN)
- inogatran (INN)
- inolimomab (INN)
- inolitazone (INN)
- inotuzumab ozogamicin (INN)
- Inomax (Ikaria)
- inosine (INN)
- inositol nicotinate (INN)

=== inp-ins ===
- Inpefa
- Inpersol
- inproquone (INN)
- Inprosub
- Inspra
- Instant Microspheres
- Insulatard NPH Human
- insulin (INN)
- insulin argine (INN)
- insulin aspart (INN)
- insulin aspart-fsan
- insulin aspart-szjj
- insulin aspart-xjhz
- insulin defalan (INN)
- insulin degludec (INN)
- insulin detemir (INN)
- insulin glargine (INN)
- insulin glulisine (USAN)
- insulin icodec (INN)
- insulin icodec-abae
- insulin lispro (INN)
- insulin zinc suspension (amorphous) (INN)
- insulin zinc suspension (crystalline) (INN)

=== int-inv ===
- Intal
- intedanib (INN)
- Integrilin (Merck)
- Intelence (Janssen Pharmaceutica)
- interferon alfa (INN)
- interferon alfacon-1 (INN)
- interferon beta (INN)
- interferon gamma (INN)
- intermedine (INN)
- intetumumab (USAN, INN)
- intoplicine (INN)
- Intralipid (Baxter International)
- intrazole (INN)
- intriptyline (INN)
- Intron A (Schering Corp)
- Intropin (DuPont)
- Invagesic (Sandoz)
- Invanz (Merck)
- Invega (Janssen Pharmaceutica)
- Inversine
- Invirase (Roche)
