= Iodinated contrast =

Substance to enhance X-ray imaging

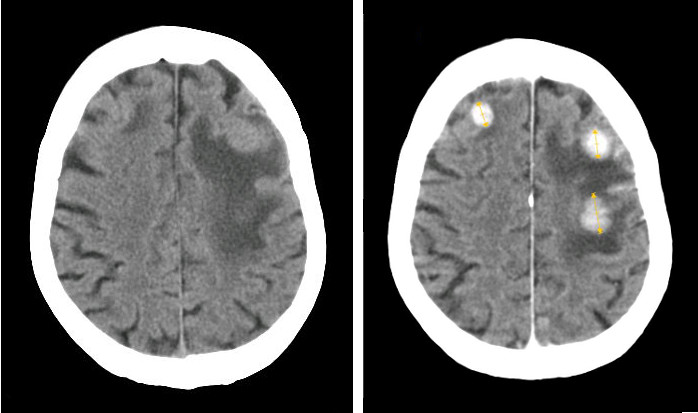
Contrast CT of a patient with brain metastases from breast cancer, before (left) and after (right) injection of iodinated contrast.

Iodinated contrast is a form of water-soluble, intravenous radiocontrast agent containing iodine, which enhances the visibility of vascular structures and organs during radiographic procedures. Some pathologies, such as cancer, have particularly improved visibility with iodinated contrast.

The radiodensity of iodinated contrast is 25–30 Hounsfield units (HU) per milligram of iodine per milliliter at a tube voltage of 100–120 kVp.

== Types ==
Iodine-based contrast media are usually classified as ionic or nonionic. Both types are used most commonly in radiology due to their relatively harmless interaction with the body and their solubility. Contrast media are primarily used to visualize vessels and changes in tissues on radiography and CT (computerized tomography). Contrast media can also be used for tests of the urinary tract, uterus, and fallopian tubes. It may cause the patient to feel as if they have had urinary incontinence. It also puts a metallic taste in the patient's mouth.

The iodine may be bound either in an organic (nonionic) compound or an ionic compound. Ionic agents were developed first and are still in widespread use depending on the requirements, but may result in additional complications due to the high concentration of ions (hyperosmolality). Organic agents that covalently bind the iodine have fewer side effects as they do not dissociate into component molecules. Many of the side effects are due to the hyperosmolar solution being injected. i.e., they deliver more iodine atoms per molecule. The more iodine, the more "dense" the X-ray effect.

Organic iodine molecules used for contrast include iohexol, iodixanol, and ioversol. Iodine-based contrast media used nowadays are water-soluble. These contrast agents are sold as clear, colorless water solutions, with the concentration usually expressed as mg I/ml. Modern iodinated contrast agents can be used almost anywhere in the body. Most often they are used intravenously, but for various purposes they can also be used intra-arterially, intrathecally (as in diskography of the spine), and intra-abdominally – just about any body cavity or potential space.

Heating non-ionic contrast agent to human body temperature reduces its viscosity.

The amount of iodine administered in children in the United States in 2010 was 272 to 740 mg/kg for CT scan.

Iodine contrast agents are used for the following:

- Contrast CTs
- Angiography (arterial investigations)
- Myelography (spinal investigations)
- Venography (venous investigations)
- VCUG (voiding cystourethrography)
- HSG (hysterosalpingogram)
- IVU (intravenous urography)

Commonly used ionic iodinated contrast agents
Name	Type	Iodine content	Osmolality	
diatrizoate (Hypaque 50/ Gastrografin)	Monomer	300 mgI/ml	1550	High
metrizoate (Isopaque 370)	Monomer	370 mgI/ml	2100	High
iothalamate (Conray)	Monomer		600-2400	High
ioxaglate (Hexabrix)	Dimer	320 mgI/ml	580	Low

Commonly used nonionic contrast agents
Name	Type	Iodine content	Osmolality	
iopamidol (Isovue 370)	Monomer	370 mgI/ml	796	Low
iohexol (Omnipaque 350)	Monomer	350 mgI/ml	884	Low
ioxilan (Oxilan 350)	Monomer	350 mgI/ml	695	Low
iopromide (Ultravist 370)	Monomer	370 mgI/ml	774	Low
iodixanol (Visipaque 320)	Dimer	320 mgI/ml	290	Low
iobitridol (Xenetix 300)	Monomer	300 mgI/ml	695	Low
ioversol	Monomer			

== Adverse effects ==
Iodinated contrast agents may cause allergic reactions, contrast-induced nephropathy, hyperthyroidism, and possibly metformin accumulation. However, there are no absolute contraindications to iodinated contrast, so the benefits need to be weighed against the risks.

Hypersensitivity towards iodinated contrast agent is associated with increase in histamine and tryptase concentration in blood. Diphenhydramine (Benadryl) 50 mg orally or intravenously one hour before contrast administration can reduce the risk of urticaria, angioedema, and respiratory symptoms.

An observational study conducted across 133,331 patients concluded that iodinated contrast injected through veins has more hypersensitivity reactions than when injected through arteries. However, the cause for this phenomenon is unknown.

In people with myasthenia gravis, older forms of iodinated contrast have caused an increased risk of exacerbation of the disease, but modern (low-osmolar) forms have no immediate increased risk.

=== Hypersensitivity reactions ===
Anaphylactoid reactions occur rarely, but can occur in response to injected as well as oral and rectal contrast and even retrograde pyelography. They are similar in presentation to anaphylactic reactions, but are not caused by an IgE-mediated immune response. Patients with a history of contrast reactions, however, are at increased risk of anaphylactoid reactions. Pretreatment with corticosteroids has been shown to decrease the incidence of adverse reactions.

Anaphylactoid reactions range from urticaria and itching, to bronchospasm and facial and laryngeal edema. For simple cases of urticaria and itching, an oral or intravenous antihistamine such as diphenhydramine is appropriate. For more severe reactions, including bronchospasm and facial or neck edema, an albuterol inhaler, or subcutaneous or IV epinephrine, plus diphenhydramine, may be needed. If respiration is compromised, an airway must be established before medical management.

Anaphylaxis to ionic (high osmolar) contrast agent injections occurred in two clusters of reactions on two occasions (1983 and 1987) in a single radiology clinic in London, Ontario. On each occasion, these anaphylactic reactions were associated with contamination of the injection by natural rubber components (disposable plastic syringes in the first case and rubber ampoule seals in the second case). The allergenic-toxic rubber leachate was MBT (mercaptobenzothiazole). This is a known allergen that becomes bound to plasma proteins, creating a hapten-protein complex – a signature mechanism in true IgE drug allergy and true anaphylactic reactions (not "anaphylactoid" reactions).

A Japanese syringe manufacturer, Terumo, implicated in syringe-related toxic laboratory cell culture effects in Australia in 1981, was instrumental in pro-actively making Japanese disposable syringes and ampoule seals free of natural rubber. Katayama's 1990 article in Radiology showed that a new type of nonionic (low osmolar) contrast agent was associated with significantly fewer severe life-threatening reactions than the older ionic (high osmolar) contrast agents. By merchandizing the Katayama series reprints, manufacturers persuaded users worldwide to switch to the almost exclusive use of the expensive nonionic agents.

What was unknown to the Katayama researchers was that the ampoule seals of the "safer" nonionic contrast agents were made from artificial rubber, whereas the ionic agents were sealed with natural rubber. In 1987, it was the leaching of allergenic MBT from the rubber seals of ionic ampoules that caused a series of allergic reactions (including anaphylaxis) in a radiology office in Canada. The worldwide hazard of MBT contamination of injections was unknown then and, as the World Health Organization reported it remains as an unknown hazard still – after three decades.

The most significant study, proving that injections of ionic (high osmolar) agents are at least as safe as the newer, very expensive nonionic agents, was published in Radiology in 1997. Lasser did not comment that the marked drop in the incidence of severe reactions with ionic agents was related to the removal of natural rubber contamination from ionic ampoule seals.

==== Contribution of seafood and other allergies ====
The term "iodine allergy" should be omitted because this kind of allergy does not exist. Seafood "allergy" is not a contraindication for the use of iodinated contrast materials, because in seafood allergy the immune system is directed against the muscle protein tropomyosin. While iodine levels in seafood are higher than in non-seafood items, the consumption of the latter exceeds that of the former by far, and there is no evidence that the iodine content of seafood is related to reactions to seafood. Available data suggest that seafood allergy increases the risk of a contrast-mediated reaction by approximately the same amount as allergies to fruits or those with asthma. In addition, those with an alcohol intolerance should avoid use of this product due to chemical breakdown similar to ethyl alcohol. Studies show that B.A.C. has been shown to increase exponentially for up to 72 hours after contrast is administered, resulting in altered results of urine, blood, and breath alcohol screens. Those with a history of severe contrast reaction will have a six-fold increased risk of adverse reaction. Those with a history of asthma will have a sixfold increased risk of low-osmolar contrast media and a 10-fold increased risk of high-osmolar contrast media.

Over 85% of patients with seafood allergies will not have an adverse reaction to iodinated contrast. Finally, there is no evidence that adverse skin reactions to iodine-containing topical antiseptics (e.g., povidone-iodine) are of any specific relevance to administration of I.V. contrast material.

IL-2 medication poses no risk for the acquisition of adverse events by radiocontrast agents.

=== Effects on kidney function ===
Contrast-associated acute kidney injury or contrast-induced acute kidney injury is a debated phenomenon, in which there is a 50% increase in serum creatinine or an absolute increase in serum creatinine of 0.3 mg/dL (26.4 μmol/L) within 48 hours after contrast medium exposure. Iodinated contrast may be toxic to the kidneys, possibly when given in large doses via the arteries, but the actual occurrence is unknown or rare. Nonionic contrast agents, which are almost exclusively used in CT scans, have not been shown to cause acute kidney injury when given intravenously at doses needed for CT studies.

=== Effects on thyroid function ===
Iodinated contrast media exposure can potentially cause incident hyperthyroidism and incident overt hypothyroidism." Hyperthyroidism is the effect of iodine being a substrate of thyroid hormones, and is then called the Jod-Basedow phenomenon. The risk is higher in those with an underlying thyroid disease, such as toxic multinodular goiter, Graves' disease, or Hashimoto's thyroiditis, where thyroid monitoring is indicated. Otherwise, for the general population, routine screening with thyroid function tests is generally not feasible.

=== Drug interactions ===
It has been recommended that metformin, an oral antidiabetic agent, be stopped for 48 hours following the intravascular administration of contrast media and that the use of metformin not be resumed until kidney function is normal. Metformin is not nephrotoxic; the reasoning is that if the contrast medium causes acute kidney injury and the person continues to take metformin (which is normally excreted by the kidneys), there may be a toxic accumulation of metformin, increasing the risk of lactic acidosis, a dangerous complication.

However, guidelines published by the American College of Radiologists suggest this is not as important for patients who have normal kidney function and no evidence of acute kidney injury. If kidney impairment is found before administration of the contrast, metformin should be withheld for 48 hours following the procedure and until kidney function has returned to normal.

Contrast exposure may interfere with subsequent radioiodine treatment, causing unwanted delays in the management of thyroid cancer.

Previously, beta blockers have been assumed to be a risk factor for the acquisition of contrast medium-induced adverse reactions/hypersensitivity reactions. Due to recent investigations it became clear that beta blockers do not increase the frequency of adverse reactions in concert with radiocontrast agents.

=== Pregnancy ===
Iodinated contrast in medical imaging in pregnancy, when orally administered, is harmless. Intravenous administration of iodinated radiocontrast agents can cross the placenta and enter the fetal circulation, but animal studies have reported no teratogenic or mutagenic effects from its use. There have been theoretical concerns about the potential harm of free iodide on the fetal thyroid gland, but multiple studies have shown that a single dose of intravenously administered iodinated contrast medium to a pregnant mother does not affect neonatal thyroid function. Nevertheless, it generally is recommended that radiocontrast only be used if required to obtain additional diagnostic information that will improve the care of the fetus or mother.

=== Breastfeeding ===
American College of Radiology (ACR) guidelines state that iodinated contrast administration to a breastfeeding mother is considered safe for both the mother and child. Still, mothers who remain concerned about any potential adverse effects to the child are recommended to have the option of abstaining from breastfeeding for 24 hours, with continued milk extraction such as by a breast pump during that period. Mothers who opt for this for non-emergent exams may also use a breast pump to obtain milk before the exam to feed the child during the 24-hour abstinence period. What is also important, breastfeeding women should be asked whether they want to take a break from breastfeeding after CM administration.

== See also ==
- Contrast agent
- Contrast CT
- Lithium iodide § Applications (disused)
- Organoiodine compound
