= C17H22I3N3O8 =

The molecular formula C_{17}H_{22}I_{3}N_{3}O_{8} (molar mass: 777.085 g/mol) may refer to:

- Iomeprol
- Iopamidol
