= Iobitridol =

Pharmaceutical drug

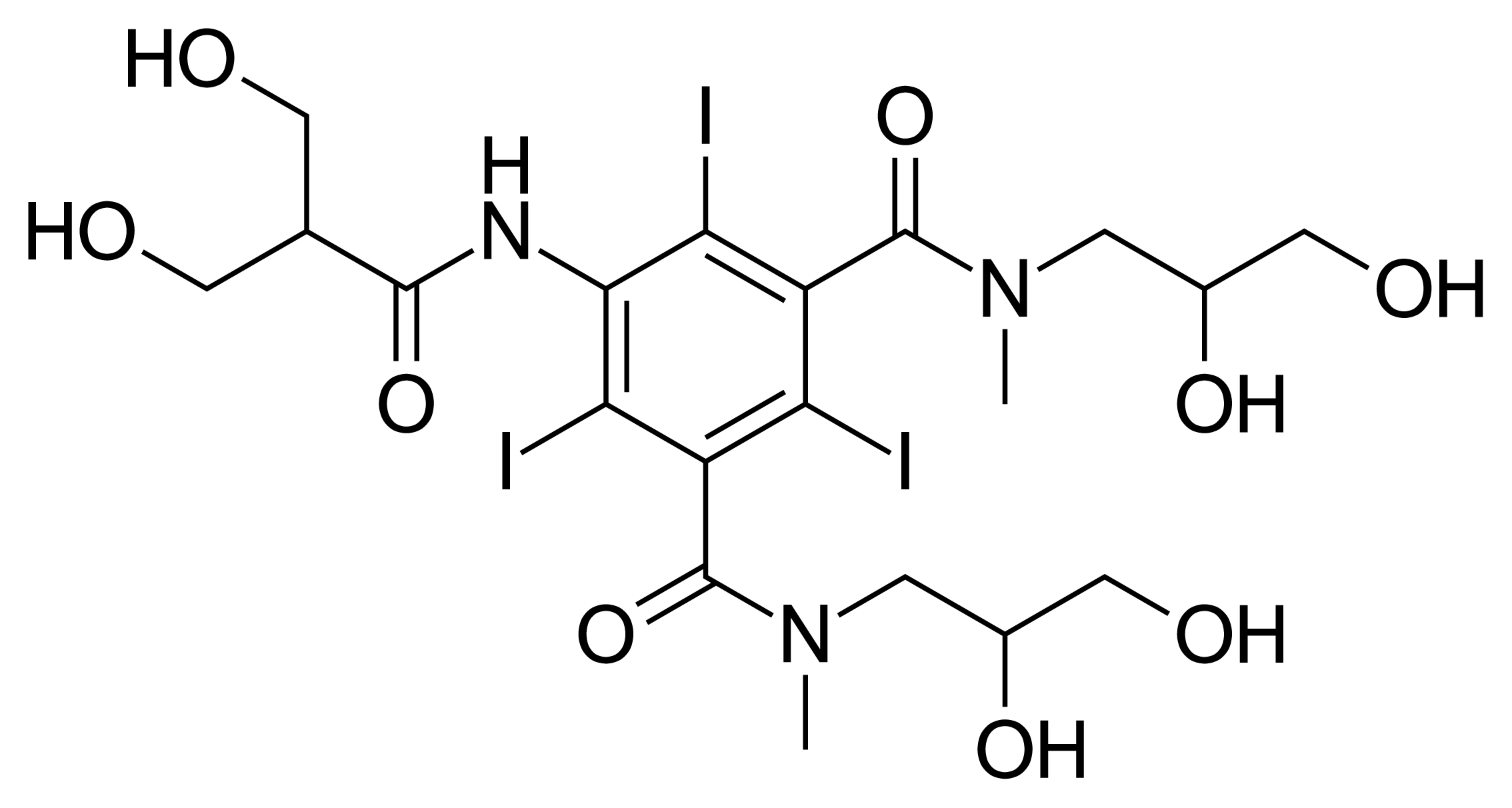

Clinical data
- Trade names: Xenetix
- AHFS/Drugs.com: UK Drug Information
- Routes of administration: Intravenous, joint injection, instillation into body cavities
- ATC code: V08AB11 (WHO)

Legal status
- Legal status: UK: POM (Prescription only)

Pharmacokinetic data
- Protein binding: ~2%
- Metabolism: none
- Elimination half-life: 1.8 hours
- Excretion: unchanged via kidneys

Identifiers
- IUPAC name: 1-N,3-N-bis(2,3-dihydroxypropyl)-5-[3-hydroxy-2-(hydroxymethyl)propanamido]-2,4,6-triiodo-1-N,3-N-dimethylbenzene-1,3-dicarboxamide
- CAS Number: 136949-58-1
- PubChem CID: 65985
- DrugBank: DB12407
- ChemSpider: 59379
- UNII: 182ECH14UH
- KEGG: D01181
- ChEBI: CHEBI:31701
- ChEMBL: ChEMBL2107212
- CompTox Dashboard (EPA): DTXSID90869865

Chemical and physical data
- Formula: C_{20}H_{28}I_{3}N_{3}O_{9}
- Molar mass: 835.169 g·mol^{−1}
- 3D model (JSmol): Interactive image
- SMILES: CN(CC(CO)O)C(=O)c1c(c(c(c(c1I)NC(=O)C(CO)CO)I)C(=O)N(C)CC(CO)O)I
- InChI: InChI=1S/C20H28I3N3O9/c1-25(3-10(31)7-29)19(34)12-14(21)13(20(35)26(2)4-11(32)8-30)16(23)17(15(12)22)24-18(33)9(5-27)6-28/h9-11,27-32H,3-8H2,1-2H3,(H,24,33); Key:YLPBXIKWXNRACS-UHFFFAOYSA-N

Iobitridol (trade name Xenetix) is a pharmaceutical drug used as an iodine-based radiocontrast agent in X-ray imaging. It is injected into blood vessels, joints, or body cavities such as the uterus, and filtered out by the kidneys. Its most common adverse effect is nausea. Severe allergic reactions are rare.

The drug received its first marketing approval in 1994 in France and is approved for use in many European countries including the UK, but not in the US. It is manufactured by Guerbet.

== Medical uses ==
Iobitridol is used for intravenous urography (imaging of the urinary system via a vein), angiography (imaging of blood vessels), angiocardiography (heart and coronary arteries), arthrography (joints), hysterosalpingography (uterus and fallopian tubes), and imaging of the cranium and the whole body. It is approved for use in adults and children.

== Contraindications ==
The drug is contraindicated in people with manifest hyperthyreosis because of its iodine content. It must not be used to image the uterus or fallopian tubes in pregnant women.

== Adverse effects ==
Iobitridol is generally well tolerated. The only side effect observed in more than 1% of patients is nausea. Rare side effects (in fewer than 1 per 10.000 people) include anaphylaxis (severe allergic reactions), circulatory collapse, kidney failure, thyroid-related effects, and skin reactions such as Stevens–Johnson syndrome. Rare side effects in brain imaging include convulsions, transient sight disorders, memory loss, and coma.

== Overdose ==
Overdosing is unlikely. It is managed by rehydration therapy and monitoring of the kidney function for at least three days. If necessary, iobitridol can be removed from the body by haemodialysis.

== Interactions ==
Drug interactions are the same as with other iodine-containing contrast agents: patients taking diuretics are at a higher risk of developing kidney failure under iobitridol unless they receive a water and electrolyte infusion before imaging. As the diabetes drug metformin is eliminated via the kidneys, it is recommended that people with severe kidney impairment should pause metformin during and after they are given iobitridol.

Certain antihypertensive (blood pressure lowering) drugs such as beta-blockers, ACE inhibitors, and sartans can prevent the heart from compensating for low blood pressure, with an increased risk of circulatory collapse. Iodine-131, a radioactive isotope used for thyroid imaging (scintigraphy) and therapy of thyroid cancers, can be less effective when used within several weeks after the application of iobitridol because of residual iodine in the body.

Interleukin 2 cancer therapy has been thought to result in more severe side effects than iobitridol, but a 2009 literature search has found no such risk.

== Pharmacology ==
=== Mechanism of action ===
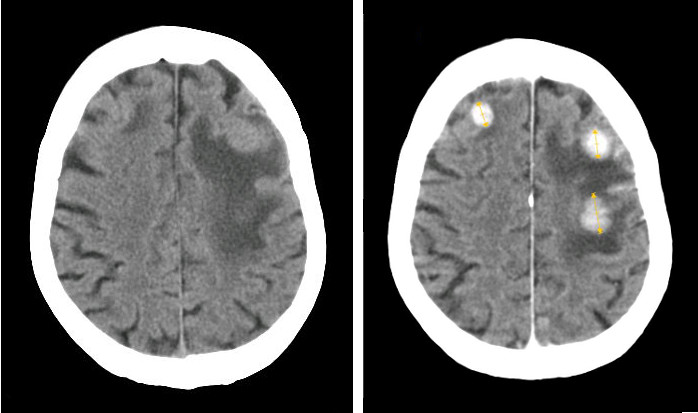
CT scan of three brain metastases from breast cancer. Before (left image) and after (right image) injection of an iodinated contrast agent similar to iobitridol.

Iobitridol is an iodine-containing radiocontrast agent. The iodine atoms readily absorb X-rays, resulting in better contrast in radiography images. The quality of images made with this drug is equally good as with other low– or medium–osmolarity iodinated contrast agents such as iopamidol or iohexol.

=== Pharmacokinetics ===
After intravenous infusion, iobitridol is distributed in the circulatory system and the interstitium. The substance is only marginally bound to blood plasma proteins (to about 2%) and membrane proteins because the hydrophilic side chains of the molecule efficiently mask the central iodinated benzene ring. It is not metabolized but eliminated in the unchanged form via the kidneys by glomerular filtration without active secretion or reabsorption. The elimination half-life is 1.8 hours.

In people with kidney failure, the substance is instead eliminated via the bile duct.

== Chemistry ==
Of the molecular mass, 45.6% is contributed by the three iodine atoms. Iobitridol is nonionic but water-soluble, having some OH groups in its side chains designed to mask the central hydrophobic benzene ring.

The solution has a low osmolarity of 695 (Xenetix 300) or 915 mOsm/kg H_{2}O (Xenetix 350), which means it causes fewer allergic and allergy-like reactions, as well as less extravasation (leakage of blood vessels) than contrast agents with higher osmolarities.
