= C22H28O5 =

The molecular formula C_{22}H_{28}O_{5} may refer to:

- Estradiol hemisuccinate (Estradiol succinate)
- Isoprednidene
- Meprednisone
- 16α-Methyl-11-oxoprednisolone
- Prednylidene
- Pyrethrin II
