= List of drugs: U =

This multi-page article lists pharmaceutical drugs alphabetically by name. Many drugs have more than one name and, therefore, the same drug may be listed more than once. Brand names and generic names are differentiated by capitalizing brand names.

See also the list of the top 100 bestselling branded drugs, ranked by sales.

Abbreviations are used in the list as follows:

- INN = International nonproprietary name
- BAN = British Approved Name
- USAN = United States Adopted Name
- Two-letter codes for countries

Lists of drugs
1–9 | A | B | C | D | E | F | G | H | I | J | K | L | M | N | O | P | Q | R | S | T | U | V | W | X | Y | Z

- urethane (INN)
- U-47700
- U-Cort
- U-Gencin
- ubenimex (INN)
- Ubeslo
- ubidecarenone (INN)
- ubisindine (INN)
- ublituximab (INN)
- Ubrelvy
- Ucedane
- Ucephan
- Uceris
- udenafil (INN, USAN)
- Udenyca
- ufenamate (INN)
- ufiprazole (INN)
- Ukoniq
- ularitide (INN)
- Ulcerease
- uldazepam (INN)
- Ulesfia
- ulimorelin (USAN, INN)
- ulipristal (USAN)
- Ulo
- ulobetasol (INN)
- Uloric
- Ulspira
- Ultacan Forte
- Ultacan
- Ultane
- Ultibro Breezhaler
- Ultiva
- Ultomiris
- Ultra-Technekow Fm
- Ultracef
- Ultracet
- Ultragris-165
- Ultragris-330
- Ultragris
- Ultralente
- Ultram Er
- Ultram
- Ultramop
- Ultraquin
- 'Ultrase
- Ultratag
- Ultravate
- Ultravist 150
- Ultravist 240
- Ultravist 300
- Ultravist 370
- Ultravist
- Ulunar Breezhaler
- umeclidinium bromide (USAN)
- umespirone (INN)
- umifenovir (INN)
- umirolimus (INN)
- Unasyn
- Unguentine
- Uni-Decon
- Uni-Dur
- Uni-Fed
- Uni-Pro
- Uni-tussin
- Unidet
- Unipen In Plastic Container
- Unipen
- Uniphyl
- Unipres
- Uniretic
- Unisom
- Unitensen
- Unithroid
- Unituxin
- Univasc
- Univol
- Unloxcyt
- unoprostone (INN)
- upamostat (INN)
- upenazime (INN)
- Uplizna
- Upneeq
- Upstaza
- Uptravi
- Urabeth
- uracil mustard
- uramustine (INN)
- urapidil (INN)
- Urasal
- Ureaphil
- Urecholine
- uredepa (INN)
- uredofos (INN)
- urefibrate (INN)
- urelumab (USAN)
- Uremol
- Urese
- Urex
- Uri-Tet
- uridine triacetate (INN)
- Urisec
- Urised
- Urispas
- Uristat
- Urobak
- Urocit-K
- Urodine
- urofollitropin (INN)
- urokinase alfa (INN)
- urokinase (INN)
- Urologic
- Uromitexan
- Uroplus Ds
- Uroplus Ss
- Uroplus
- Urorec
- Urovist Cysto Pediatric
- Urovist Cysto
- Urovist Meglumine Diu/Ct
- Urovist Sodium 300
- Urovist
- Uroxatral
- Urso 250
- Urso Forte
- Urso
- ursodeoxycholic acid (INN)
- Ursodiol
- ursulcholic acid (INN)
- urtoxazumab (INN)
- usistapide (USAN, INN)
- ustekinumab-aauz
- ustekinumab-aekn
- ustekinumab-auub
- ustekinumab-hmny
- ustekinumab-kfce
- ustekinumab-srlf
- ustekinumab-stba
- ustekinumab-ttwe
- Utebzi
- ustekinumab (USAN, INN)
- utibapril (INN)
- utibaprilat (INN)
- Utibron
- Uticillin Vk
- Uticort
- Utimox
- Utradol
- Uvadex
- Uzedy
- Uzpruvo
