= C4H5N3O =

The molecular formula C_{4}H_{5}N_{3}O (molar mass: 111.10 g/mol, exact mass: 111.0433 u) may refer to:

- Cytosine (Cyt)
- Imexon
- Isocytosine, or 2-aminouracil
