= Ioxaglic acid =

Chemical compound

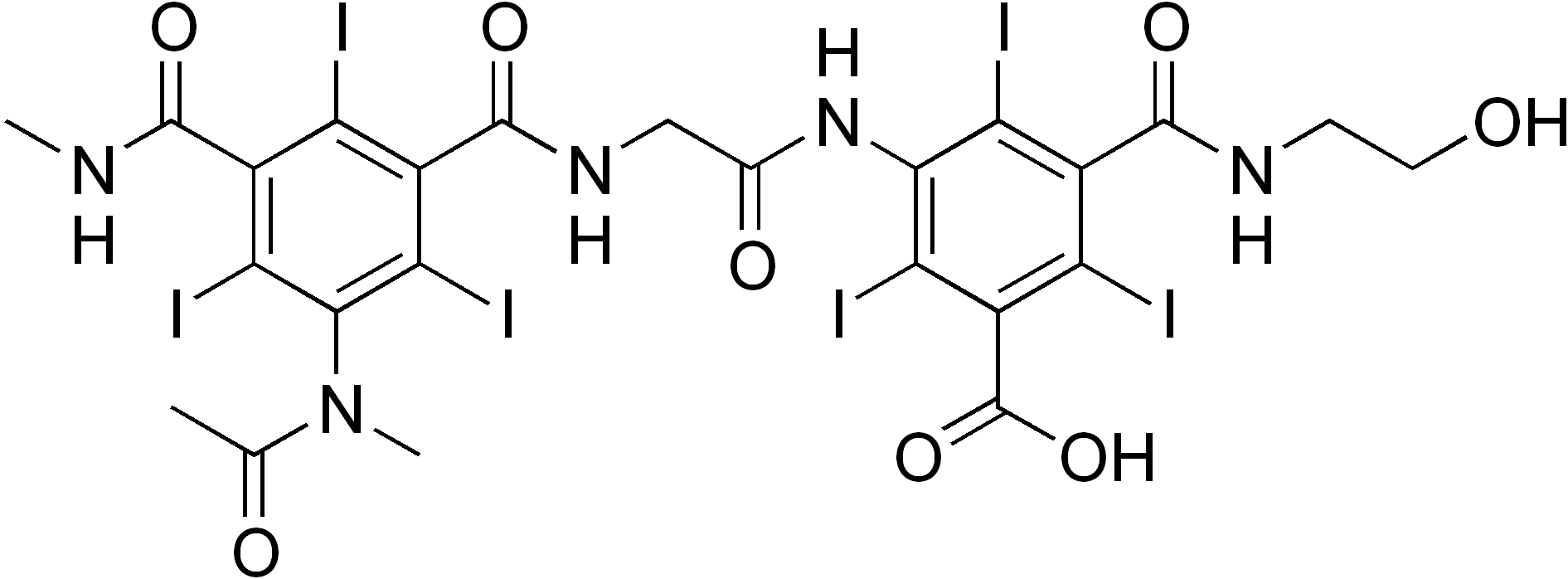

Clinical data
- Trade names: Hexabrix
- AHFS/Drugs.com: FDA Professional Drug Information
- Routes of administration: Intravascular, intraarticular, by mouth
- ATC code: V08AB03 (WHO)

Legal status
- Legal status: In general: ℞ (Prescription only)

Pharmacokinetic data
- Protein binding: 14%
- Metabolism: None
- Elimination half-life: 92 min
- Excretion: Unchanged via kidneys

Identifiers
- IUPAC name: 3-[(2-hydroxyethyl)carbamoyl]-2,4,6-triiodo-5-(2-{[2,4,6-triiodo-3-(methylcarbamoyl)-5-(N-methylacetamido)phenyl]formamido}acetamido)benzoic acid
- CAS Number: 59017-64-0
- PubChem CID: 3742
- DrugBank: DB09313
- ChemSpider: 3611
- UNII: Z40X7EI2AF
- KEGG: D01761
- ChEMBL: ChEMBL1201291
- CompTox Dashboard (EPA): DTXSID5023166
- ECHA InfoCard: 100.055.945

Chemical and physical data
- Formula: C_{24}H_{21}I_{6}N_{5}O_{8}
- Molar mass: 1268.886 g·mol^{−1}
- 3D model (JSmol): Interactive image
- SMILES: CC(=O)N(C)C1=C(C(=C(C(=C1I)C(=O)NCC(=O)NC2=C(C(=C(C(=C2I)C(=O)O)I)C(=O)NCCO)I)I)C(=O)NC)I
- InChI: InChI=1S/C24H21I6N5O8/c1-7(37)35(3)20-17(29)10(21(39)31-2)13(25)11(18(20)30)23(41)33-6-8(38)34-19-15(27)9(22(40)32-4-5-36)14(26)12(16(19)28)24(42)43/h36H,4-6H2,1-3H3,(H,31,39)(H,32,40)(H,33,41)(H,34,38)(H,42,43); Key:TYYBFXNZMFNZJT-UHFFFAOYSA-N

Ioxaglic acid (trade name Hexabrix) is pharmaceutical drug used as an iodinated contrast medium for X-ray imaging. It has low osmolality (relatively few molecules per volume), typically resulting in fewer side effects than high-osmolality media. It is manufactured by Guerbet, but marketing in the US has been discontinued. As of 2021, it may still be available in some European countries.

It is applied in form of its salts, ioxaglate meglumine and ioxaglate sodium.

== Medical uses ==
Uses include angiography (imaging of blood vessels, including those of the brain and heart), arthrography (imaging of joints), urography (imaging of the urinary system), hysterosalpingography (imaging of the uterus and fallopian tubes), imaging of the gastrointestinal tract, and endoscopic retrograde cholangiopancreatography (ERCP; imaging of the biliary and pancreatic ducts).

== Contraindications ==
Ioxaglic acid is contraindicated in people with hyperthyreosis because of the drug's iodine content. It must not be used for myelography (spinal cord imaging), for hysterosalpingography in women who are pregnant or have an acute inflammation in the pelvic region, or for arthrography if the joint is infected.

== Adverse effects ==
Adverse effects include reactions at the injection site, such as a hot or painful feeling as well as general reactions such as nausea and vomiting. All of these are usually mild and transient. Allergy-like effects such as itching, sneezing, coughing and yawning can be the first sign of severe adverse reactions, especially a shock.

Accidental intrathecal administration (into the spinal canal) can result in life-threatening reactions such as convulsions, cerebral (brain) edema or cerebral bleed.

== Interactions ==
Iodine-131, a radioactive isotope used for thyroid imaging (scintigraphy) and therapy of thyroid cancers, can be less effective when used within two to six weeks after application of ioxaglic acid because of residual iodine in the body.

== Pharmacology ==
=== Chemistry and mechanism of action ===
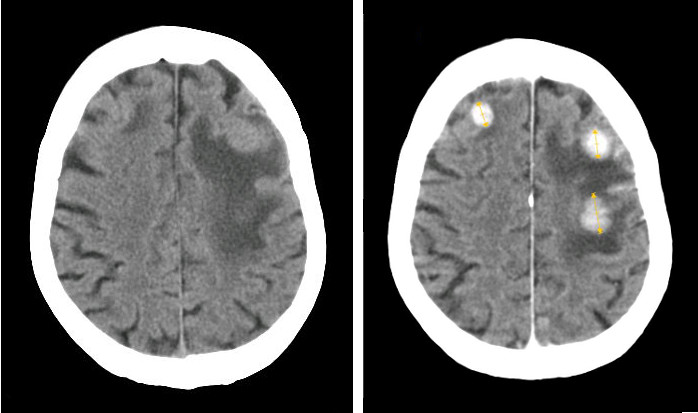
Contrast CT of a patient with brain metastases from breast cancer, before (left) and after (right) injection of an iodine-containing contrast agent

Ioxaglic acid is an iodine-containing, water-soluble radiocontrast agent. The iodine atoms readily absorb X-rays, resulting in a higher contrast of X-ray images. It has a low osmolality of 600 mosm/kg water at 37 °C (99 °F), meaning that the solution has a relatively low concentration of molecules; this is usually associated with fewer adverse effects than high-osmolality contrast agents.

=== Pharmacokinetics ===
After injection into a vein, 14% of the circulating ioxaglic acid is bound to blood plasma proteins, which is unusually high for a water-soluble iodinated contrast agent. The substance is distributed in the body with a half-life of 12 minutes (range 4 to 17 minutes) and eliminated in unmetabolized (unchanged) form via the kidneys with a half-life of 92 minutes (range 61 to 140 minutes). In people with kidney failure, it is eliminated via the bile duct, saliva or sweat.
