= Lutetium arsenate =

Names
- Other names Lutetium(III) arsenate

Identifiers
| CAS Number | 18490-52-3 |
| 3D model (JSmol) | Interactive image |
| PubChem CID | 173857965 |
- InChI: InChI=1S/AsH3O4.Lu/c2-1(3,4)5;/h(H3,2,3,4,5);/q;+3/p-3 Key: AHMUNOVWRYAXBU-UHFFFAOYSA-K
- SMILES: [O-][As](=O)([O-])[O-].[Lu+3]

Properties
| Chemical formula | LuAsO_{4} |
| Molar mass | 313.89 g/mol |
| Appearance | Colorless crystalline solid |
| Density | 6.92 g/cm^{3} (calculated, 25 °C) |
| Solubility in water | Sparingly soluble in water |

Structure
| Crystal structure | Tetragonal, xenotime type |
| Space group | I4_{1}/amd, No. 141 |
| Lattice constant | a = 0.6949 nm, c = 0.6227 nm |
| Formula units (Z) | 4 |
- Except where otherwise noted, data are given for materials in their standard state (at 25 °C [77 °F], 100 kPa). Infobox references

Lutetium arsenate is an inorganic compound of lutetium and the arsenate ion, with the formula LuAsO_{4}. It is a colorless, sparingly soluble crystalline solid and crystallizes in the tetragonal xenotime structure type.

== Preparation ==
Lutetium arsenate can be prepared by precipitation from aqueous solutions containing lutetium(III) and arsenate ions. For example, lutetium(III) chloride reacts with sodium arsenate:

LuCl_{3} + Na_{3}AsO_{4} → LuAsO_{4}↓ + 3 NaCl

This method has been reported as part of systematic preparations of rare-earth arsenates.

Anhydrous LuAsO_{4} has also been prepared by heating a mixture of lutetium(III) oxide and arsenic(III) oxide. A sample prepared at the U.S. National Bureau of Standards was heated first at 1050 °C and subsequently at 1250 °C.

Single crystals can be grown by high-temperature flux methods for spectroscopic and structural studies.

== Properties ==
=== Crystal structure ===
Lutetium arsenate crystallizes in the tetragonal crystal system, space group I4_{1}/amd (No. 141), with the xenotime or zircon structure type.

The single-crystal refinement gives lattice parameters a = 6.949 Å, c = 6.227 Å with four formula units per unit cell.

An independent powder-diffraction determination at 25 °C gave closely similar parameters of a = 6.9509 Å and c = 6.2321 Å, with a calculated density of 6.924 g/cm^{3}.

The structure contains isolated AsO^{3−}_{4} tetrahedra and eight-coordinate Lu^{3+} ions. The LuO_{8} coordination polyhedra share edges to form chains that are linked by arsenate tetrahedra into a three-dimensional framework.

LuAsO_{4} lies at the small-cation end of the rare-earth arsenate series and is firmly within the xenotime-type stability field.

=== Solubility ===
Lutetium arsenate is very sparingly soluble in water. A concentration-based solubility-product value of pK_{sp,c} = 22.66 ± 0.01 has been reported.

=== Vibrational properties ===
Polarized Raman spectroscopy of LuAsO_{4} single crystals shows the vibrational modes expected for a xenotime-type rare-earth arsenate.

Across the rare-earth arsenate series from Sm to Lu, the internal vibrational frequencies of the AsO_{4} tetrahedra generally increase with increasing atomic number, while most lattice-mode frequencies change much less strongly.
