= Magnetic resonance myelography =

Medical Imaging Technique

Magnetic Resonance Myelography

Magnetic resonance myelography (MR myelography or MRI myelography) is a noninvasive medical imaging technique that can provide anatomic information about the subarachnoid space. It is a type of MRI examination that uses a contrast medium and magnetic resonance imaging scanner to detect pathology of the spinal cord, including the location of a spinal cord injury, cysts, tumors and other abnormalities. The procedure involves the injection of a gadolinium based contrast media into the cervical or lumbar spine, followed by the MRI scan.

== Procedure ==
The radiologist will first numb the skin with the local anesthetic and then inject the gadolinium based contrast media into the spinal cord at the interspace between third and fourth lumbar vertebrae (L3-L4). Then the patient will be asked to roll on the table until the contrast is evenly distributed in the spinal cord and fill the nerve roots. Then the patient will be transferred to the MRI table and the scan will be taken.

== Postprocedural care ==
- The patient should be adequately hydrated to remove contrast from the body.
- The patient should be observed following the examination for adverse effects of contrast media.
- The myelogram is performed on an outpatient basis, So the patient should be properly instructed regarding limitations following the procedure such as driving.
- Instructions regarding postprocedural care, including warning signs of adverse reactions and the possibility of persistent headaches, should be given to the patient by a trained professional.
- A physician should be available to answer questions and provide patient management following the procedure.

== Indications ==
- Demonstration of the site of a cerebrospinal fluid leak (postlumbar puncture headache, postspinal surgery headache, rhinorrhea, or otorrhea)
- Surgical planning, especially in regard to the nerve roots.
- Radiation therapy planning.
- Diagnostic evaluation of spinal or basal cisternal disease.
- Nondiagnostic MRI studies of the spine or skull base.
- Poor correlation of physical findings with MRI.

== Contraindications ==
- Metallic Implants unless made up of titanium.
- Pacemakers

== Advantages ==
Major advantages of MR myelography over conventional radiographic myelography include its lack of ionizing radiation, noninvasive nature, and lack of need for intrathecal contrast material.

== See also ==
- Myelography
- MRI
