= Cholangiopancreatography =

Cholangiopancreatography can refer to:

- Endoscopic retrograde cholangiopancreatography
- Magnetic resonance cholangiopancreatography
