= Iopromide =

Chemical compound

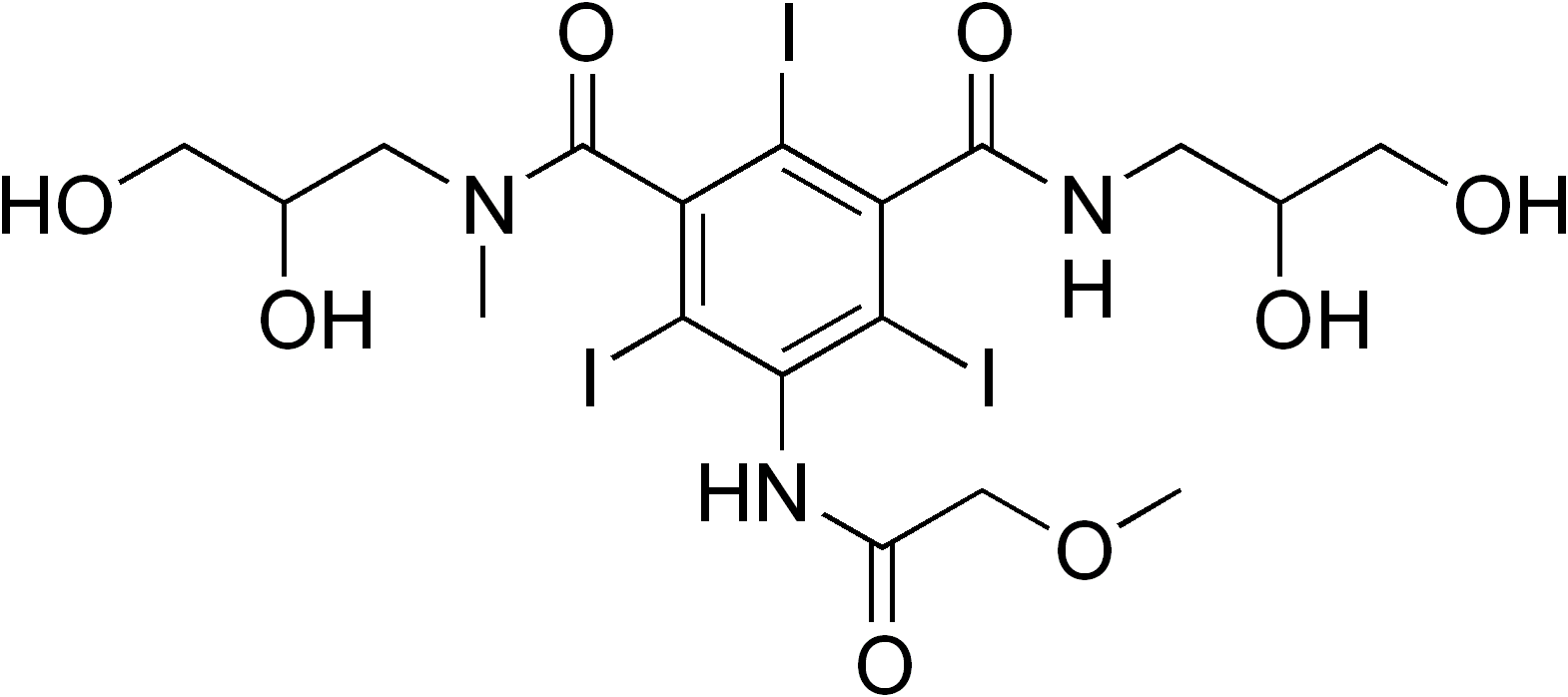

Clinical data
- Trade names: Ultravist
- AHFS/Drugs.com: Micromedex Detailed Consumer Information
- Pregnancy category: AU: B2
- Routes of administration: Intravascular
- ATC code: V08AB05 (WHO)

Legal status
- Legal status: US: ℞-only

Pharmacokinetic data
- Protein binding: ~1%
- Metabolism: None
- Elimination half-life: 2 hours
- Excretion: Kidneys

Identifiers
- IUPAC name: 1-N,3-N-bis(2,3-dihydroxypropyl)-2,4,6-triiodo-5-(2-methoxyacetamido)-1-N-methylbenzene-1,3-dicarboxamide
- CAS Number: 73334-07-3
- PubChem CID: 3736
- DrugBank: DB09156
- ChemSpider: 3605
- UNII: 712BAC33MZ
- KEGG: D01893
- ChEBI: CHEBI:63578
- ChEMBL: ChEMBL1725
- CompTox Dashboard (EPA): DTXSID0023163
- ECHA InfoCard: 100.070.330

Chemical and physical data
- Formula: C_{18}H_{24}I_{3}N_{3}O_{8}
- Molar mass: 791.116 g·mol^{−1}
- 3D model (JSmol): Interactive image
- SMILES: CN(CC(CO)O)C(=O)c1c(c(c(c(c1I)NC(=O)COC)I)C(=O)NCC(CO)O)I
- InChI: InChI=1S/C18H24I3N3O8/c1-24(4-9(28)6-26)18(31)12-13(19)11(17(30)22-3-8(27)5-25)14(20)16(15(12)21)23-10(29)7-32-2/h8-9,25-28H,3-7H2,1-2H3,(H,22,30)(H,23,29); Key:DGAIEPBNLOQYER-UHFFFAOYSA-N

Iopromide is an iodinated contrast medium for X-ray imaging. It is marketed under the name Ultravist which is produced by Bayer Healthcare. It is a low osmolar, non-ionic contrast agent for intravascular use; i.e., it is injected into blood vessels.

It is commonly used in radiographic studies such as intravenous urograms, brain computer tomography (CT) and CT pulmonary angiograms (CTPAs).

== Medical uses ==
The radiocontrast agent is given intravenously in computed tomography (CT) scans, angiography and excretory urography.

== Contraindications ==
Iopromide use is contraindicated in myelography, cerebral ventriculography and cisternography procedures. It is also contraindicated in those with hyperthyroidism, or with known allergy to the drug.

Iopromide is also contraindicated in children with prolonged fasting, fluid restriction, on laxative, or dehydration as it can cause renal failure.
