= Bracco (company) =

Italian healthcare company

Bracco S.p.A.
- Type: Private
- Industry: Chemical, pharmaceutical
- Founded: 1927
- Founder: Elio Bracco
- Headquarters: Milan, Italy
- Area served: Worldwide
- Key people: Diana Bracco (President and CEO of the Bracco Group); Fulvio Renoldi Bracco (Vice Chairman and CEO of Bracco Imaging)
- Products: Contrast agents, injectors, medical devices, pharma
- Revenue: ▲€2,000,000,000 (2024)
- Number of employees: 4,000 (2024)
- Website: www.bracco.com

The Bracco Group is an Italian multinational active in the healthcare sector, specialized globally in diagnostic imaging. The company has a workforce of over 4,000 employees and consolidated annual revenues of approximately €2 billion, 88% generated by international markets.

In Research and Development, the company allocates approximately 9% of its reference turnover in the imaging diagnostics and medical devices sectors, maintaining a portfolio of over 2,500 patents and 11 innovation centers across the world. Diana Bracco serves as President and CEO, and Fulvio Renoldi Bracco as Vice-President and CEO of Bracco Imaging.

The company’s portfolio includes pharmaceutical products for diagnostic imaging, including contrast agents for X-ray, Computed Tomography (CT), and Magnetic Resonance Imaging (MRI), as well as microbubbles for Contrast Enhanced Ultrasound (CEUS), and Molecular Imaging through radioactive tracers and PET imaging agents, alongside AI-based applications. Bracco Group also develops contrast management technologies for cardiovascular angiography and radiology imaging.

In Italy, Bracco Group established the CDI - Centro Diagnostico Italiano, an outpatient healthcare provider specialized in prevention, diagnosis, and rehabilitation services. The Group operates in over 100 countries both directly and through subsidiaries, joint ventures, and licensing or distribution agreements, with significant market presence in North America, China, Europe, and Japan.

Historically, the Bracco brand in Italy is associated with pharmaceutical products such as Cebion, Xamamina, Euclorina, the Alfa eye-drops line, and the Friliver range of sport supplements. services. In 2016, Bracco sold its pharmaceutical division to the Italian biopharmaceutical group Dompé. The divestment allowed Bracco to focus on its core business of diagnostic imaging.

== History ==
The company founded by Elio Bracco was established in 1927 in Milan with the name Società Italiana Prodotti E Merck, to produce, package and sell the chemical products of the German company E. Merck. It had just five employees. In 1934 Fulvio Bracco, Elio's son, officially joined the company which, the same year, began marketing Cebion, an innovative product based on vitamin C, recently discovered by the Hungarian biochemist Albert Szent-Györgyi. In 1962 Bracco researchers created the first contrast agent based on their original research: iodamide, a product with very high tolerability. On 17 March 1977 Diana Bracco, Fulvio's daughter, was appointed Bracco General Manager.

In 1981 the company launched Iopamidol in Italy and Germany. In the second half of the 1980s, Bracco Spa became the leading international producer of non-ionic contrast agents. It also won a positive response and important results for other formulations, including the anti-tuberculosis drug pyrazinamide, of which Bracco is the leading world producer, which is included in the WHO list of essential pharmaceuticals.

In 1990, Bracco began a ten-year period of important growth. At international level, acquisitions and joint ventures enhanced the Group structure. In 1990 the Bracco Eisai joint venture was set up in Japan. In 1994 Bracco acquired Squibb Diagnostic, a company in the Bristol Myers Squibb group in the United States, which is still Bracco Imaging's largest market today. 1995 saw the integration of the three research centres in Milan, Geneva and Princeton: Milan focuses on the research and development of contrast agents for radiology and magnetic resonance, Bracco Research Geneva on ultrasound and Bracco Research USA Princeton on magnetic resonance and nuclear medicine.

1999 was a milestone year for the company: the Bracco family and the Merck Group reached an agreement under which Bracco bought Merck's 50% stake in the Group's diagnostic and pharmaceuticals operations. In 2001, the Bracco Group acquired ACIST Medical Systems, a US company based in Eden Prairie, Minnesota, a suburb of Minneapolis, active in advanced contrast-agent management and injection systems. Meanwhile, the Group's international growth continued, with more offices opening around the world.

In 2001, the Group launched a second-generation Sulphur hexafluoride contrast agent, which had been conceived at the Bracco research laboratories in Geneva and developed in international ultrasound research centers. That same year, the Group established Bracco UK Limited for imagining operations in the United Kingdom and Ireland, along with Bracco Far East Ltd., based in Hong Kong, and Bracco Sine Pharmaceutical Corp. Ltd. based in Shanghai. Additionally, the Minneapolis-based company ACIST Medical Systems, a specialist in advanced contrast agent administration systems, joined the Bracco Group. ACIST Medical Systems currently develops and distributes contrast agent injection systems for cardiology, radiology, and both diagnostic and interventional purposes.

Since 2002 Bracco has had a direct presence in China with Bracco Sine Pharmaceutical Corp. Ltd. in Shanghai. The Group established the CRB - Bracco Research Centre within the Bioindustry Park Silvano Fumero in Colleretto Giacosa, in the Italian region Piedmont, which focuses on the initial discovery phase of new molecules and new sustainable processes, such as alternative forms of packaging. Alongside its research activities, the center also produces contrast media.

In April of that same period, the Group completed the reclamation of the production site in Torviscosa, in the province of Udine. With the opening of the SPIN facility, Bracco Group repurposed a historical industrial site dating back to the 1930s, utilizing its location in Central Europe to integrate industrial production with environmental preservation.

In 2004, the Bracco Sine facility was inaugurated in the high-tech Pudong district of Shanghai. The site specializes in the final production phases of contrast agents and produces non-ionic contrast media for X-ray, magnetic resonance imaging (MRI), and ultrasound imaging.

In 2008 it acquired E-Z-EM, a leading company in the radiology sector. In 2010 Bracco entered Estonia, Scandinavia and South Korea. In February of the same year, Bracco Foundation (Fondazione Bracco) was established, with Diana Bracco serving as President and Gemma Bracco as Vice-President. The foundation develops and supports cultural, scientific, and social projects, drawing upon the historical background of the Bracco family.

In 2011 Bracco Imaging acquired Swiss Medical Care (now Bracco Injeneering) and the Nycomed production plants in Singen (Germany). The Group expanded its European commercial operations by establishing subsidiaries in Slovakia (Bracco Imaging Slovakia), Poland (Bracco Imaging Polska), and the Czech Republic (Bracco Imaging Czech). In 2012 it completed the acquisitions of Justesa in Argentina, Mexico and Brazil.

In 2016, ACIST Medical Systems inaugurated its new European headquarters. That same year, Bracco Group completed the sale of its Pharma division to the Italian biopharmaceutical Group Dompé, a transaction intended to consolidate the pharmaceutical activities of both domestic entities. Additionally, Bracco Group and Shanghai Pharmaceuticals Holding renewed their Bracco-Sine joint venture partnership until 2037.

In 2019, Bracco Imaging entered the field of Personalised Diagnostics through the acquisition of Blue Earth Diagnostics, a molecular imaging company based in Oxford, UK. The acquisition enhanced Bracco’s portfolio in precision medicine and personalised diagnostics, while also expanding its range of nuclear oncology imaging services in the urology segment and other specialties.

In 2020, marking the 30th anniversary of Bracco Suisse, the Group commenced construction on a new multipurpose building at its Geneva site. The facility was designed to expand the existing infrastructure and double its manufacturing capacity, serving as a primary production hub in conjunction with the R&D center.

In 2021, Blue Earth Diagnostics expanded its oncology portfolio by acquiring an exclusive license for a radiopharmaceutical therapeutic technology (theranostics). In 2022, Bracco Imaging established a new subsidiary, Blue Earth Therapeutics, focused on developing the next generation of radiopharmaceutical oncology technologies to address unmet medical needs. That same year, Bracco Imaging signed a global collaboration agreement with Guerbet for Gadopiclenol, an investigational gadolinium-based macrocyclic contrast agent (GBCA).

In 2023, the joint venture with Eisai was dissolved, leading to the establishment of Bracco Japan, headquartered in Tokyo. In November 2024, Bracco Suisse inaugurated Hexagon, its new multifunctional building, designed to increase the global supply of its microbubble-based ultrasound contrast agents.

== Group Companies ==
- Bracco S.p.A. - Milan (Italy)
- Bracco Imaging S.p.A. - Milan (Italy)
- Bracco Imaging Holding (Italy)
- Bracco RE
- SPIN S.p.A. - Torviscosa (Italy)

=== Europe ===
- Bracco Suisse
- Bracco Oesterreich
- SurgVision
- Bracco Imaging France
- Bracco Imaging Europe
- Bracco UK
- Bracco Imaging Scandinavia
- Bracco Imaging Czech/Slovakia
- Bracco Imaging Polska
- Blue Earth Diagnostics
- Blue Earth Therapeutics

=== North America ===
- Bracco Diagnostics
- E-Z-EM Canada
- Blue Earth Diagnostics

=== Latin America ===
- Bracco Imaging do Brasil
- Justesa Imagen Mexicana S.A. de C.V.

=== Asia ===
- Bracco Japan
- Bracco Far-East
- Bracco Sine
- Bracco Imaging Korea
- Bracco Imaging Medical Technologies

=== Gruppo C.D.I. ===
- Centro Diagnostico Italiano
- Bionics
- Centro Medico SME

=== Bracco Medical Technologie (BMT) ===
- Acist Medical System – US
- Acist Europe
- Bracco Injeneering
