= Iomeprol =

Chemical compound

Clinical data
- Trade names: Iomervu, others
- License data: US DailyMed: Iomeprol
- Routes of administration: Intravenous, intra-arterial
- ATC code: V08AB10 (WHO)

Legal status
- Legal status: US: ℞-only; In general: ℞ (Prescription only)

Pharmacokinetic data
- Metabolism: none
- Elimination half-life: 109±20 min
- Excretion: Kidney

Identifiers
- IUPAC name: 1-N,3-N-bis(2,3-dihydroxypropyl)-5-(2-hydroxy-N-methylacetamido)-2,4,6-triiodobenzene-1,3-dicarboxamide
- CAS Number: 78649-41-9
- PubChem CID: 3731
- DrugBank: DB11705
- ChemSpider: 3600
- UNII: 17E17JBP8L
- KEGG: D01719
- ChEBI: CHEBI:31710
- CompTox Dashboard (EPA): DTXSID1049061

Chemical and physical data
- Formula: C_{17}H_{22}I_{3}N_{3}O_{8}
- Molar mass: 777.089 g·mol^{−1}
- 3D model (JSmol): Interactive image
- SMILES: Ic1c(c(I)c(c(I)c1N(C(=O)CO)C)C(=O)NCC(O)CO)C(=O)NCC(O)CO
- InChI: InChI=1S/C17H22I3N3O8/c1-23(9(29)6-26)15-13(19)10(16(30)21-2-7(27)4-24)12(18)11(14(15)20)17(31)22-3-8(28)5-25/h7-8,24-28H,2-6H2,1H3,(H,21,30)(H,22,31); Key:NJKDOADNQSYQEV-UHFFFAOYSA-N

Iomeprol, sold under the brand name Imeron among others, is a medication used as a radiocontrast agent in X-ray imaging.

Iomeprol was approved for medical use in the United States in November 2024.

== Side effects ==
It is classified as a water-soluble, nephrotrophic, low osmolar X-ray contrast medium. Low osmolar non-ionic agents are better tolerated and less likely to cause side effects than the high osmolar ionic agents.

== Society and culture ==
Iomeprol is not metabolized in the human body but excreted in unchanged form. It is decomposed slowly and can therefore accumulate in the environment.

=== Legal status ===
Iomeprol was approved for medical use in the United States in November 2024.

=== Brand names ===
Iomeprol is sold under the brand name Iomervu.
