= Incadronic acid =

Chemical compound

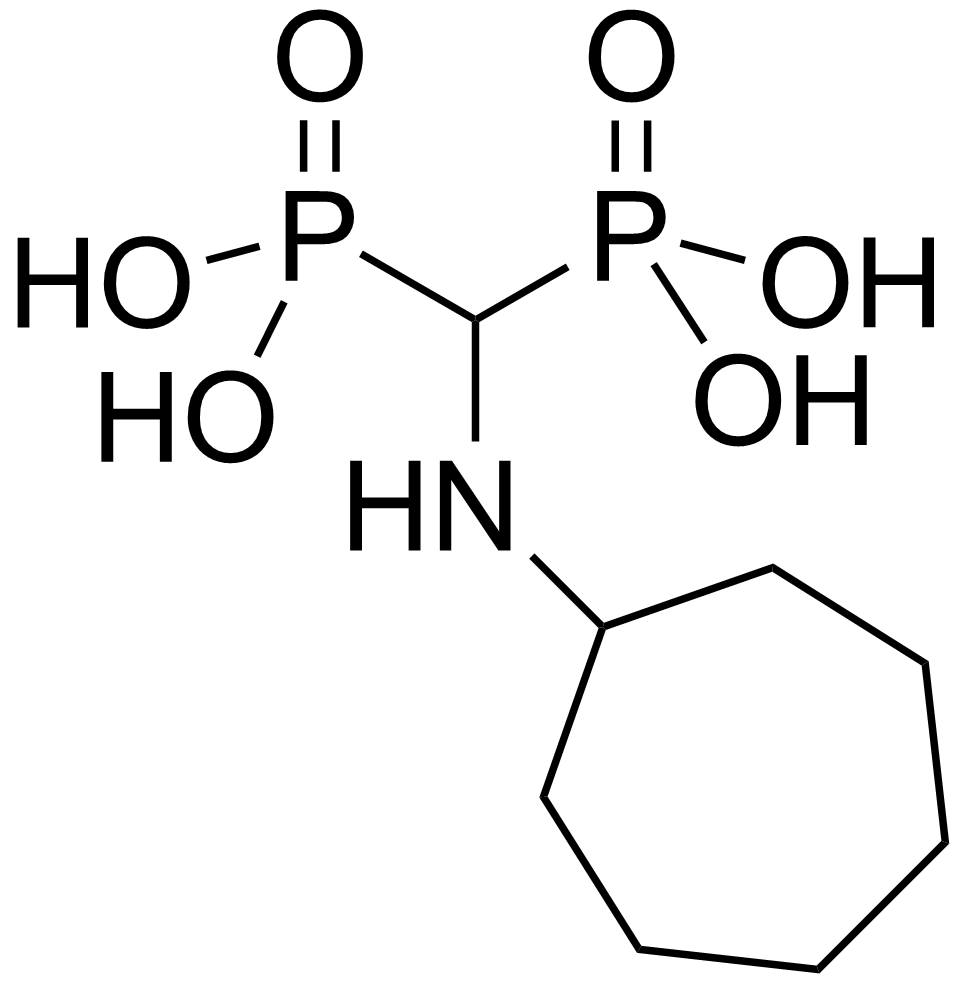

Clinical data
- AHFS/Drugs.com: International Drug Names
- Routes of administration: IV
- ATC code: none

Legal status
- Legal status: AU: Not marketed; CA: Not marketed; UK: Not marketed; US: Not marketed; In general: ℞ (Prescription only)

Identifiers
- IUPAC name: [(Cycloheptylamino)methylene]bis(phosphonic acid)
- CAS Number: 124351-85-5
- PubChem CID: 3699
- ChemSpider: 3571
- UNII: G5C4M8847E
- KEGG: D08073
- ChEMBL: ChEMBL53950
- CompTox Dashboard (EPA): DTXSID90154283

Chemical and physical data
- Formula: C_{8}H_{19}NO_{6}P_{2}
- Molar mass: 287.189 g·mol^{−1}
- 3D model (JSmol): Interactive image
- SMILES: O=P(O)(O)C(NC1CCCCCC1)P(=O)(O)O
- InChI: InChI=1S/C8H19NO6P2/c10-16(11,12)8(17(13,14)15)9-7-5-3-1-2-4-6-7/h7-9H,1-6H2,(H2,10,11,12)(H2,13,14,15); Key:LWRDQHOZTAOILO-UHFFFAOYSA-N

Incadronic acid (INN, trade name Bisphonal) is a bisphosphonate.
