= Arachnoiditis =

Inflammation of the arachnoid mater

- Myelogram showing arachnoiditis in the lumbar spine
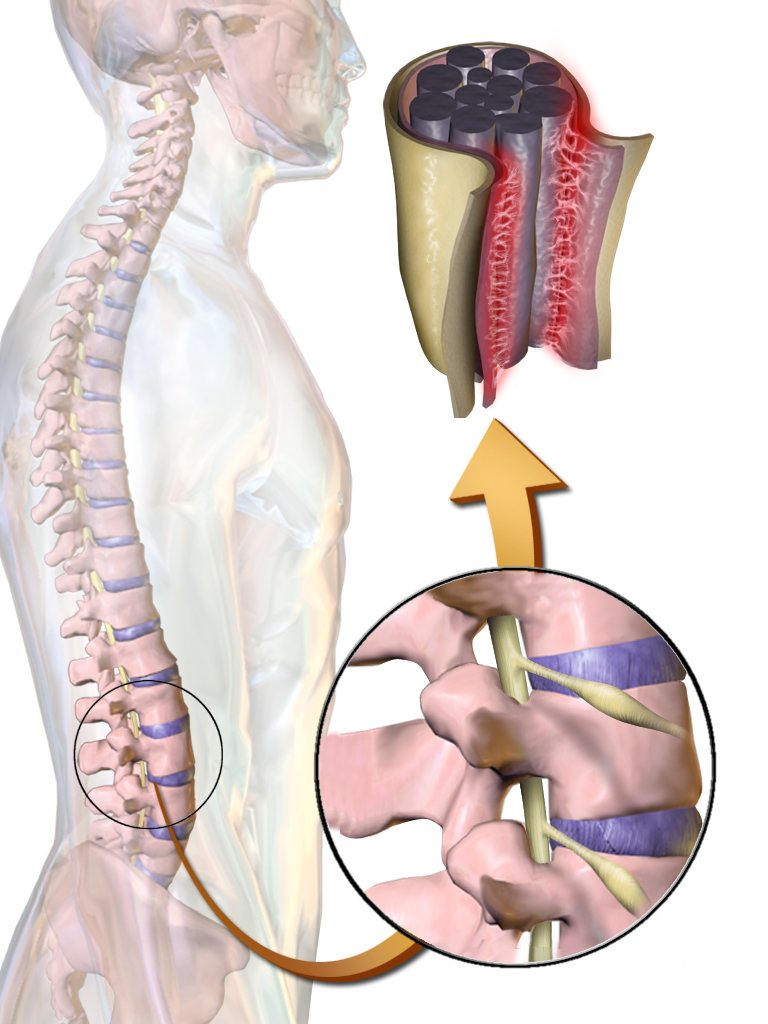
- Illustration of Arachnoiditis
- Specialty: Neurosurgery

Arachnoiditis is an inflammatory condition of the arachnoid mater or 'arachnoid', one of the membranes known as meninges that surround and protect the central nervous system. The outermost layer of the meninges is the dura mater (Latin for hard) and adheres to inner surface of the skull and vertebrae. The arachnoid is under or "deep" to the dura and is a thin membrane that adheres directly to the surface of the brain and spinal cord.

== Signs and symptoms ==
Arachnoid inflammation can lead to many painful and debilitating symptoms which can vary greatly in each case, and not all people experience all symptoms. Chronic pain is common, including neuralgia, while numbness and tingling of the extremities can occur with spinal cord involvement, and bowel, bladder, and sexual functioning can be affected if the lower part of the spinal cord is involved. While arachnoiditis has no consistent pattern of symptoms, it frequently affects the nerves that supply the legs and lower back. Many patients experience difficulty sitting for long (or even short) periods of time due to discomfort or pain.

== Etiology ==
Arachnoiditis has been described as having many different etiologies. As an infectious source, tuberculosis, syphilis, candida, mycosis, and HIV. As a mechanical source, spinal and cranial surgery, trauma, and disc herniation. Prior disease including ankylosing spondylitis, autoimmune vasculitis, and Guillain–Barré syndrome have been known to cause arachnoiditis. Chemical causes include morphine, myelograms with oil-based radiographic contrast agents, phenolic solutions, chlorhexidine, epidural injection of steroids and antibiotics, blood in subarachnoid hemorrhage, epidural blood patches and anesthetics.

Oftentimes, the precise cause of arachnoiditis is not known due to the variable latency from cause to symptom onset. With growing incidence of spine surgery, a common cause of arachnoiditis is lumbar spine procedures.

== Pathogenesis ==
The above etiologies can cause inflammation of the arachnoid, leading to arachnoiditis. This inflammation is enough to cause pain and even potentially neurological deficits - symptoms caused by nerves not communicating properly with the body's mechanisms for sensation and movement. The inflammation can lead to the formation of scar tissue and adhesion that can make the spinal nerves "stick" together, a condition where such tissue develops in and between the leptomeninges - between dura and arachnoid or pia and arachnoid. This condition can be very painful, especially when progressing to adhesive arachnoiditis. Adhesive arachnoiditis occurs when inflammation leads to recruitment of cells to the area and fibrous exudate, and ensuing deposition of collagen forms bands that could cause ischemia or even atrophy of the spinal cord or nerve roots. Chronic inflammation could lead to arachnoiditis ossificans, in which the inflamed arachnoid becomes ossified, or turns to bone, and is thought to be a late-stage complication of the adhesive form of arachnoiditis. More serious complications can occur, including spinal cord swelling, myelomalacia, cauda equina syndrome, and hydrocephalus.

== Diagnosis ==
Diagnosis is based on a combination of clinical findings, patient examination, and imaging evaluation. The most common affected area is the lumbar region of the back, and includes the classic symptomatic triad of back pain, neurological deficits, and MRI with notable adhesions. For the ossificans form of the condition, unenhanced CT may better show the presence and extent of arachnoid ossifications, and is complementary to MRI, as MRI can be less specific and findings can be confused with regions of calcification or hemosiderin.

== Treatment ==
Arachnoiditis can be difficult to treat and treatment is generally limited to alleviation of pain and other symptoms. While arachnoiditis may not yet be curable with the potential to be life-altering, management including medication, physical therapy, and if appropriate, psychotherapy, can help patients cope with the difficulties it presents.

Medications that have been used to treat arachnoiditis include nonsteroidal anti-inflammatory drugs, pulse steroid therapy with methylprednisolone, and multi-modal pain regimens. Surgical intervention generally has a poor outcome and may only provide temporary relief, but some cases of surgical success have been reported. Epidural steroid injections to treat sciatic pain have been linked as a cause of the disease by the U.S. Food and Drug Administration as well as in other research, and are therefore discouraged as a treatment for arachnoiditis as they will most likely worsen the condition.

== Prognosis ==
Arachnoiditis is a chronic disorder with no known cure, and prognosis may be difficult to determine because of an unclear correlation between the beginning of the disease or source and the appearance of symptoms. For many, arachnoiditis is a disabling disease that causes chronic pain and neurological deficits, and may also lead to other spinal cord conditions, such as syringomyelia.
