= Lutetium(III) chloride =

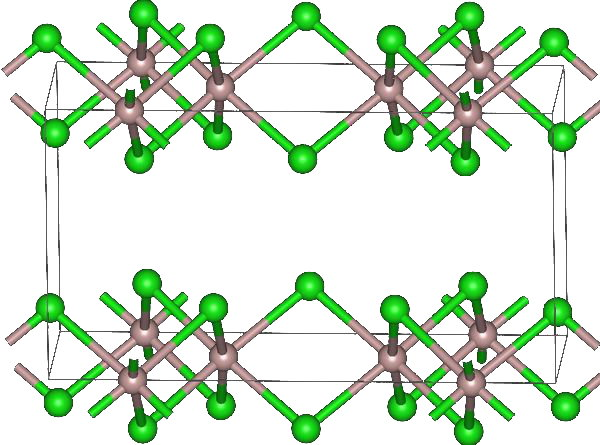

Names
- IUPAC name Lutetium(III) chloride
- Other names Lutetium chloride, lutetium trichloride

Identifiers
| CAS Number | 10099-66-8 |
| 3D model (JSmol) | Interactive image |
| ChemSpider | 23297 |
| ECHA InfoCard | 100.030.205 |
| EC Number | 233-240-1 |
| PubChem CID | 24919 |
| RTECS number | OK8400000 |
| UNII | 2VY5D2E2HC |
| CompTox Dashboard (EPA) | DTXSID2064941 |
- InChI: InChI=1S/3ClH.Lu/h3*1H;/q;;;+3/p-3 Key: AEDROEGYZIARPU-UHFFFAOYSA-K; InChI=1S/3ClH.Lu/h3*1H;/q;;;+3/p-3 Key: AEDROEGYZIARPU-DFZHHIFOAO; Key: AEDROEGYZIARPU-UHFFFAOYSA-K
- SMILES: Cl[Lu](Cl)Cl

Properties
| Chemical formula | LuCl_{3} |
| Molar mass | 281.325 g/mol |
| Appearance | colorless or white monoclinic crystals |
| Density | 3.98 g/cm^{3} |
| Melting point | 925 °C (1,697 °F; 1,198 K) |
| Boiling point | sublimes above 750°C |
| Solubility in water | soluble |

Structure
| Crystal structure | Monoclinic, mS16 |
| Space group | C2/m, No. 12 |

Pharmacology
| License data | EU EMA: by Lutetium (177 Lu) chloride |

Hazards
- Occupational safety and health (OHS/OSH)
| Main hazards | Irritant |
- GHS labelling
| Pictograms | (GHS07: Exclamation mark) |
| Signal word | Warning |
| Hazard statements | H315, H319, H335 |
| Precautionary statements | P261, P264, P271, P280, P302+P352, P304+P340, P305+P351+P338, P312, P321, P332+P313, P337+P313, P362, P403+P233, P405, P501 |
| NFPA 704 (fire diamond) | 2 0 1 |

Related compounds
| Other anions | Lutetium(III) oxide |
| Other cations | Ytterbium(III) chloride Scandium(III) chloride Yttrium(III) chloride |
- Except where otherwise noted, data are given for materials in their standard state (at 25 °C [77 °F], 100 kPa). verify (what is ?) Infobox references

Lutetium(III) chloride or lutetium trichloride is the chemical compound composed of lutetium and chlorine with the formula LuCl_{3}. It forms hygroscopic white monoclinic crystals and also a hygroscopic hexahydrate LuCl_{3}·6H_{2}O. Anhydrous lutetium(III) chloride has the YCl_{3} (AlCl_{3}) layer structure with octahedral lutetium ions. Its isotopologue lutetium (^{177}Lu) chloride is used as a radioactive tracer for diagnosis and/or treatment in anti-cancer therapies.

== Reactions ==
Pure lutetium metal can be produced from lutetium(III) chloride by heating it together with elemental calcium:

2 LuCl_{3} + 3 Ca → 2 Lu + 3 CaCl_{2}

== See also ==
- Lutetium (^{177}Lu) chloride
