= Indacaterol/glycopyrronium bromide =

Combination drug

Combination of
- Indacaterol: Ultra-long-acting beta-adrenoceptor agonist
- Glycopyrronium bromide: Muscarinic anticholinergic

Clinical data
- Trade names: Ultibro Breezhaler, Utibron Neohaler, Xoterna Breezhaler
- Pregnancy category: AU: B3
- Routes of administration: Inhalation only
- ATC code: R03AL04 (WHO)

Legal status
- Legal status: AU: S4 (Prescription only); CA: ℞-only; UK: POM (Prescription only); US: ℞-only; EU: Rx-only

Identifiers
- CAS Number: 444313-53-5
- PubChem CID: 11564052
- KEGG: D10505
- CompTox Dashboard (EPA): DTXSID60155126

Indacaterol/glycopyrronium bromide, sold under the brand name Ultibro Breezhaler among others, is a fixed-dose combination medication for inhalation consisting of the following two active ingredients:

- Indacaterol maleate—an ultra-long-acting beta-adrenoceptor agonist (ultra-LABA);
- Glycopyrronium bromide (glycopyrrolate)—a muscarinic anticholinergic.

Indacaterol maleate/glycopyrronium bromide is used as a maintenance bronchodilator treatment to relieve symptoms in adult patients with chronic obstructive pulmonary disease (COPD).

The drug is marketed by Novartis under the trade names Ultibro Breezhaler and Utibron Neohaler in Europe and the United States, respectively. In 2016, Novartis licensed its U.S. commercial rights for Seebri Neohaler and Utibron Neohaler to Sunovion Pharmaceuticals.
