= Icotrokinra =

Medication for psoriasis

Clinical data
- Pronunciation: /aɪkoʊtrəˈkɪnrə/ eye-koh-trə-KIN-rə
- Trade names: Icotyde
- Other names: JNJ-77242113, PN-21235, JNJ-2113, Icotrokinra hydrochloride (USAN US)
- AHFS/Drugs.com: Monograph
- MedlinePlus: a626053
- License data: US DailyMed: Icotrokinra
- Routes of administration: Oral
- Drug class: Interleukin 23 receptor antagonist
- ATC code: None

Legal status
- Legal status: US: ℞-only; EU: Rx-only

Identifiers
- IUPAC name: (4S)-4-[[4-[[(2S)-2-[[(2S)-2-[[(4R,7S,10S,13S,16S,19R)-19-acetamido-7-(4-acetamidobutyl)-16-(2-amino-2-oxoethyl)-13-[(1R)-1-hydroxyethyl]-3,3,20,20-tetramethyl-10-[(7-methyl-1H-indol-3-yl)methyl]-6,9,12,15,18-pentaoxo-1,2-dithia-5,8,11,14,17-pentazacycloicosane-4-carbonyl]amino]-3-[4-(2-aminoethoxy)phenyl]propanoyl]amino]-3-naphthalen-2-ylpropanoyl]amino]oxane-4-carbonyl]amino]-5-[[(2S)-4-amino-1-[[(2S)-1-[(2-amino-2-oxoethyl)-methylamino]-1-oxo-3-pyridin-3-ylpropan-2-yl]amino]-1,4-dioxobutan-2-yl]amino]-5-oxopentanoic acid
- CAS Number: 2763602-16-8
- PubChem CID: 162462321
- DrugBank: DB21724
- ChemSpider: 129786698
- UNII: MUW8FP7HNZ
- KEGG: D13108

Chemical and physical data
- Formula: C_{90}H_{120}N_{20}O_{22}S_{2}
- Molar mass: 1898.19 g·mol^{−1}
- 3D model (JSmol): Interactive image
- SMILES: CC1=C2C(=CC=C1)C(=CN2)C[C@H]3C(=O)N[C@H](C(=O)N[C@@H](C(SSC([C@@H](C(=O)N[C@H](C(=O)N[C@H](C(=O)N3)[C@@H](C)O)CC(=O)N)NC(=O)C)(C)C)(C)C)C(=O)N[C@@H](CC4=CC=C(C=C4)OCCN)C(=O)N[C@@H](CC5=CC6=CC=CC=C6C=C5)C(=O)NC7(CCOCC7)C(=O)N[C@@H](CCC(=O)O)C(=O)N[C@@H](CC(=O)N)C(=O)N[C@@H](CC8=CN=CC=C8)C(=O)N(C)CC(=O)N)CCCCNC(=O)C
- InChI: InChI=1S/C90H120N20O22S2/c1-48-16-14-20-59-57(46-97-72(48)59)42-64-79(122)99-60(21-12-13-34-96-50(3)112)77(120)108-75(89(7,8)134-133-88(5,6)74(98-51(4)113)84(127)104-66(44-69(93)115)81(124)107-73(49(2)111)83(126)102-64)85(128)103-62(39-52-23-26-58(27-24-52)132-37-32-91)78(121)100-63(40-53-22-25-55-18-10-11-19-56(55)38-53)82(125)109-90(30-35-131-36-31-90)87(130)106-61(28-29-71(117)118)76(119)101-65(43-68(92)114)80(123)105-67(41-54-17-15-33-95-45-54)86(129)110(9)47-70(94)116/h10-11,14-20,22-27,33,38,45-46,49,60-67,73-75,97,111H,12-13,21,28-32,34-37,39-44,47,91H2,1-9H3,(H2,92,114)(H2,93,115)(H2,94,116)(H,96,112)(H,98,113)(H,99,122)(H,100,121)(H,101,119)(H,102,126)(H,103,128)(H,104,127)(H,105,123)(H,106,130)(H,107,124)(H,108,120)(H,109,125)(H,117,118)/t49-,60+,61+,62+,63+,64+,65+,66+,67+,73+,74-,75-/m1/s1; Key:IVFNYXYPMJQSGF-QMRCQSNESA-N

Icotrokinra, sold under the brand name Icotyde, is a medication used for the treatment of plaque psoriasis. It is a cyclic peptide that functions as a selective interleukin 23 (IL-23) receptor antagonist. It is a synthetic peptide that binds selectively to the IL-23 receptor (IL-23R) with high affinity and competitively antagonizes the binding of IL-23. It is an immunosuppressant and interleukin inhibitor. It is being developed by Johnson & Johnson.

Icotrokinra was approved for medical use in the United States in March 2026.

== Medical uses ==
Icotrokinra is indicated for the treatment of moderate-to-severe plaque psoriasis in people aged twelve years of age and older who weigh at least 40 kilograms (88 lb) who are candidates for systemic therapy or phototherapy.

== Mechanism of action ==
Icotrokinra is a targeted oral peptide that selectively binds to and blocks the interleukin 23 receptor (IL-23R), thereby inhibiting IL-23-mediated signaling. The drug demonstrates high affinity for the human IL-23 receptor with a dissociation constant (K_{D}) of 7.1 pM and inhibits IL-23-induced STAT3 phosphorylation in peripheral blood mononuclear cells with an IC_{50} of 5.6 pM. The IL-23 pathway plays a central role in the inflammatory cascade underlying various autoimmune conditions, particularly those involving Th17 cells.

Unlike injectable biologics that target IL-23 or its receptor, icotrokinra offers the convenience of oral administration while maintaining selective receptor binding.

== Safety and tolerability ==
In phase III trials for plaque psoriasis, the most common adverse events were upper respiratory tract infections and headache. Pooled safety data from multiple studies showed similar rates of adverse events between icotrokinra and comparator groups.

== History ==
Icotrokinra was jointly discovered by Johnson & Johnson (J&J) and Protagonist Therapeutics.

== Society and culture ==
=== Legal status ===
Icotrokinra was approved for medical use in the United States in March 2026.

In July 2026, the Committee for Medicinal Products for Human Use of the European Medicines Agency adopted a positive opinion, recommending the granting of a marketing authorization for the medicinal product Icotyde, intended for the treatment of plaque psoriasis in adults and adolescents. The applicant for this medicinal product is Janssen-Cilag International N.V. Icotrokinra was authorized for medical use in the European Union in September 2026.

=== Names ===
Icotrokinra is the international nonproprietary name.

Icotrokinra is sold under the brand name Icotyde.
