= Imafen =

Antidepressant

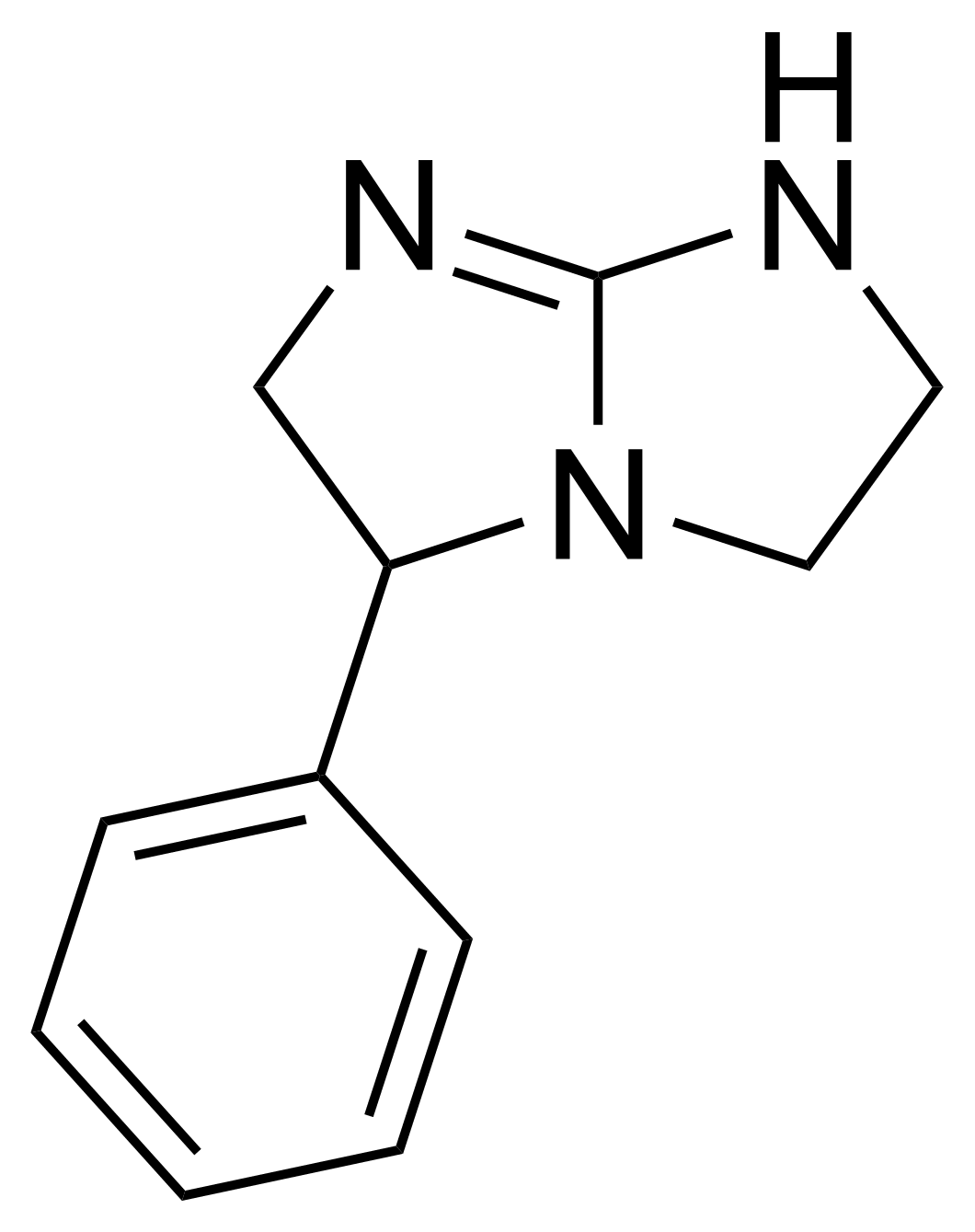

Clinical data
- ATC code: None

Identifiers
- IUPAC name: 5-phenyl-2,3,5,6-tetrahydro-1H-imidazo[1,2-a]imidazole
- CAS Number: 59198-18-4 53361-24-3 (HCl)
- PubChem CID: 163316
- ChemSpider: 143324
- UNII: 43S5D07K8G; W0X9P59ZQU (HCl)
- KEGG: D00974
- CompTox Dashboard (EPA): DTXSID801336559 DTXSID00962290, DTXSID801336559

Chemical and physical data
- Formula: C_{11}H_{13}N_{3}
- Molar mass: 187.246 g·mol^{−1}
- 3D model (JSmol): Interactive image
- SMILES: N\3=C1/NCCN1C(c2ccccc2)C/3

Imafen (R25540) is an antidepressant which was patented in the mid-1970s by Janssen, but was never marketed.
