= Urtoxazumab =

Monoclonal antibody

Monoclonal antibody
- Type: Whole antibody
- Source: Humanized (from mouse)
- Target: E. coli Shiga-like toxin II B subunit

Clinical data
- ATC code: none

Identifiers
- CAS Number: 502496-16-4
- ChemSpider: none
- UNII: 232D35B3NT

Chemical and physical data
- Formula: C_{6414}H_{9934}N_{1718}O_{2010}S_{40}
- Molar mass: 144556.44 g·mol^{−1}

Urtoxazumab is a humanized monoclonal antibody against diarrhoea caused by Escherichia coli, serotype O121. The drug is designed to bind to a toxin of this bacterium, so that it can be more easily broken down and eliminated from the body.
