= Inolimomab =

Monoclonal antibody

Monoclonal antibody
- Type: Whole antibody
- Source: Mouse
- Target: CD25

Clinical data
- ATC code: none

Identifiers
- CAS Number: 152981-31-2
- ChemSpider: none
- UNII: GO90DFK14U

Inolimomab is a mouse monoclonal antibody developed as an immunosuppressive drug against graft-versus-host disease. Its target is the alpha chain of the interleukin-2 receptor.
