= Indium (111In) imciromab =

Indium (^{111}In) imciromab
Monoclonal antibody
- Type: Fab fragment
- Source: Mouse
- Target: cardiac myosin

Clinical data
- Trade names: Myoscint
- ATC code: V09GX02 (WHO)

Legal status
- Legal status: withdrawn

Identifiers
- CAS Number: 126132-83-0 (imciromab)
- ChemSpider: none
- UNII: UT2BA2O3KN

Indium (^{111}In) imciromab (trade name Myoscint) is a mouse monoclonal antibody labelled with the radioisotope Indium-111. It was used for cardiac imaging, but withdrawn in 1993.

== See also ==
- Nuclear medicine
