= Invagesic =

Combination drug

Invagesic is a combination drug consisting of:

- caffeine
- salicylic acid
- orphenadrine

It is indicated for management of fatigue, orthostatic hypotension and for the short-term treatment of apnea of prematurity in infants.
