= 16α-Methyl-11-oxoprednisolone =

Chemical compound

Clinical data
- Other names: Dexamethasone impurity J; 17α,21-Dihydroxy-16α-methylpregna-1,4-diene-3,11,20-trione
- Drug class: Corticosteroid; Glucocorticoid

Identifiers
- IUPAC name: (8S,9S,10R,13S,14S,16R,17R)-17-Hydroxy-17-(2-hydroxyacetyl)-10,13,16-trimethyl-6,7,8,9,12,14,15,16-octahydrocyclopenta[a]phenanthrene-3,11-dione
- CAS Number: 2036-77-3
- PubChem CID: 68141632
- ChemSpider: 48063904
- UNII: NJ0LL8HN9X
- CompTox Dashboard (EPA): DTXSID60738059

Chemical and physical data
- Formula: C_{22}H_{28}O_{5}
- Molar mass: 372.461 g·mol^{−1}
- 3D model (JSmol): Interactive image
- SMILES: C[C@@H]1C[C@H]2[C@@H]3CCC4=CC(=O)C=C[C@@]4([C@H]3C(=O)C[C@@]2([C@]1(C(=O)CO)O)C)C
- InChI: InChI=1S/C22H28O5/c1-12-8-16-15-5-4-13-9-14(24)6-7-20(13,2)19(15)17(25)10-21(16,3)22(12,27)18(26)11-23/h6-7,9,12,15-16,19,23,27H,4-5,8,10-11H2,1-3H3/t12-,15+,16+,19-,20+,21+,22+/m1/s1; Key:PIDANAQULIKBQS-VUOZLLHNSA-N

16α-Methyl-11-oxoprednisolone, also known as dexamethasone impurity J, is a synthetic glucocorticoid corticosteroid which was reported in 1979 and was never marketed.
