= Uramustine =

Chemical compound

Clinical data
- ATC code: L01AD08 (WHO)

Pharmacokinetic data
- Protein binding: 5%
- Excretion: Renal

Identifiers
- IUPAC name: 5-[bis(2-Chloroethyl)amino]-1H-pyrimidine-2,4-dione
- CAS Number: 66-75-1
- PubChem CID: 6194
- IUPHAR/BPS: 7621
- DrugBank: DB00791
- ChemSpider: 5959
- UNII: W7KQ46GJ8U
- KEGG: D06265
- ChEMBL: ChEMBL1488
- CompTox Dashboard (EPA): DTXSID8026270
- ECHA InfoCard: 100.000.574

Chemical and physical data
- Formula: C_{8}H_{11}Cl_{2}N_{3}O_{2}
- Molar mass: 252.10 g·mol^{−1}
- 3D model (JSmol): Interactive image
- SMILES: O=C1C(\N(CCCl)CCCl)=C/NC(=O)N1
- InChI: InChI=1S/C8H11Cl2N3O2/c9-1-3-13(4-2-10)6-5-11-8(15)12-7(6)14/h5H,1-4H2,(H2,11,12,14,15); Key:IDPUKCWIGUEADI-UHFFFAOYSA-N

Uramustine (INN) or uracil mustard is a chemotherapy drug which belongs to the class of alkylating agents. It is used in lymphatic malignancies such as non-Hodgkin's lymphoma. It works by damaging DNA, primarily in cancer cells that preferentially take up the uracil due to their need to make nucleic acids during their rapid cycles of cell division. The DNA damage leads to apoptosis of the affected cells. Bone marrow suppression and nausea are the main side effects.

Chemically it is a derivative of nitrogen mustard and uracil.
