= Indisetron =

Chemical compound

Clinical data
- Trade names: Sinseron
- Other names: N-3389
- ATC code: none

Legal status
- Legal status: Rx in Japan

Identifiers
- IUPAC name: N-[(1R,5S)-3,9-Dimethyl-3,9-diazabicyclo[3.3.1]nonan-7-yl]-1H-indazole-3-carboxamide
- CAS Number: 141549-75-9
- PubChem CID: 178039
- ChemSpider: 2302029
- UNII: 89RBZ66NVC
- KEGG: D02632
- ChEBI: CHEBI:135344
- ChEMBL: ChEMBL2104994

Chemical and physical data
- Formula: C_{17}H_{23}N_{5}O
- Molar mass: 313.405 g·mol^{−1}
- 3D model (JSmol): Interactive image
- SMILES: CN1C[C@H]2CC(C[C@@H](C1)N2C)NC(=O)C3=NNC4=CC=CC=C43
- InChI: InChI=1S/C17H23N5O/c1-21-9-12-7-11(8-13(10-21)22(12)2)18-17(23)16-14-5-3-4-6-15(14)19-20-16/h3-6,11-13H,7-10H2,1-2H3,(H,18,23)(H,19,20)/t11?,12-,13+; Key:MHNNVDILNTUWNS-YHWZYXNKSA-N

Indisetron (INN; trade name Sinseron) is a drug used for prophylaxis of chemotherapy-induced nausea and vomiting. It was approved by Japan's Pharmaceuticals and Medical Devices Agency in 2004.

Indisetron exerts its effects as a dual serotonin 5-HT_{3} and 5-HT_{4} receptor antagonist.

== See also ==
- Granisetron
- Ondansetron
