= Iratumumab =

Monoclonal antibody

Monoclonal antibody
- Type: Whole antibody
- Source: Human
- Target: CD30

Clinical data
- ATC code: none

Identifiers
- CAS Number: 640735-09-7
- ChemSpider: none
- UNII: AYH22O1B1U
- KEGG: D04612

Chemical and physical data
- Formula: C_{6358}H_{9830}N_{1682}O_{1992}S_{38}
- Molar mass: 142922.64 g·mol^{−1}

Iratumumab is a human monoclonal antibody that was investigated for treating oncological diseases such as relapsed refractory CD30-positive lymphoma including Hodgkin's disease.

This drug was developed by Medarex, which was later acquired by Bristol-Myers Squibb.

The FDA granted orphan drug designation for Hodgkin's lymphoma in 2004. In 2009, development was suspended with no explanation given.
