= Lutetium (177Lu) chloride =

Radioactive compound used for radiopharmaceutical labeling

Lutetium (^{177}Lu) chloride
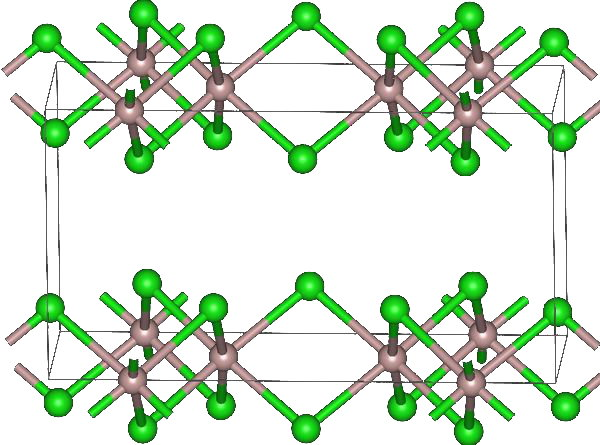

Clinical data
- Trade names: Lumark, EndolucinBeta, Illuzyce
- AHFS/Drugs.com: Monograph
- MedlinePlus: a622063
- License data: US DailyMed: Lutetium lu 177
- Pregnancy category: AU: X (High risk)
- ATC code: None

Legal status
- Legal status: AU: Unscheduled; EU: Rx-only; In general: ℞ (Prescription only)

Identifiers
- IUPAC name: (^{177}Lu)lutetium(3+) trichloride
- CAS Number: 16434-14-3
- PubChem CID: 71587001
- DrugBank: DBSALT002634
- ChemSpider: 32700269
- UNII: 1U477369SN
- KEGG: D10828
- CompTox Dashboard (EPA): DTXSID20167745

Chemical and physical data
- Formula: Cl_{3}Lu
- Molar mass: 281.32 g·mol^{−1}
- 3D model (JSmol): Interactive image
- SMILES: [Cl-].[Cl-].[Cl-].[177Lu+3]
- InChI: InChI=1S/3ClH.Lu/h3*1H;/q;;;+3/p-3/i;;;1+2; Key:AEDROEGYZIARPU-SUNKFXMWSA-K

Lutetium (^{177}Lu) chloride is a radioactive compound used for the radiolabeling of pharmaceutical molecules, aimed either as an anti-cancer therapy or for scintigraphy (medical imaging). It is an isotopomer of lutetium(III) chloride containing the radioisotope ^{177}Lu, which beta decays with a half-life of 6.64 days.

== Medical uses ==
^{177}Lu chloride is a radiopharmaceutical precursor and is not intended for direct use in patients. It is used for the radiolabeling of carrier molecules specifically developed for reaching certain target tissues or organs in the body. The molecules labeled in this way are used as cancer therapeutics or for scintigraphy, a form of medical imaging. ^{177}Lu has been used with both small molecule therapeutic agents (such as ^{177}Lu-DOTATATE) and antibodies for targeted cancer therapy

== Contraindications ==
Medicines radiolabeled with ^{177}Lu chloride must not be used in women unless pregnancy has been ruled out.

== Adverse effects ==
The most common side effects are anaemia (low red blood cell counts), thrombocytopenia (low blood platelet counts), leucopenia (low white blood cell counts), lymphopenia (low levels of lymphocytes, a particular type of white blood cell), nausea (feeling sick), vomiting, and mild, temporary hair loss.

== Society and culture ==
=== Legal status ===
^{177}Lu chloride (Lumark) was authorized for medical use in the European Union in June 2015. ^{177}Lu chloride (EndolucinBeta) was authorized for use in the European Union in July 2016.

In July 2022, the Committee for Medicinal Products for Human Use (CHMP) of the European Medicines Agency adopted a positive opinion, recommending the granting of a marketing authorization for the medicinal product Illuzyce, a radiopharmaceutical precursor. Illuzyce is not intended for direct use in people and must be used only for the radiolabeling of carrier medicines that have been specifically developed and authorized for radiolabeling with ^{177}Lu chloride. The applicant for this medicinal product is Billev Pharma ApS. Illuzyce was authorized for medical use in the European Union in September 2022.

In September 2024, the CHMP adopted a positive opinion, recommending the granting of a marketing authorization for the product Theralugand, a radiopharmaceutical precursor. Theralugand is not intended for direct use in people and must be used only for the radiolabeling of carrier medicines that have been specifically developed and authorized for radiolabeling with ^{177}Lu chloride. The applicant for this medicinal product is Eckert & Ziegler Radiopharma GmbH. Theralugand was authorized for medical use in the European Union in November 2024.

In January 2026, the CHMP adopted a positive opinion, recommending the granting of a marketing authorization for the medicinal product Ilumira, a radiopharmaceutical precursor. Ilumira is not intended for direct use in people and must be used only for the radiolabeling of carrier medicines that have been specifically developed and authorized for radiolabeling with lutetium (177Lu) chloride. The applicant for this medicinal product is SHINE Europe B.V. Ilumira was authorized for medical use in the EU in March 2026.
