= Ioversol =

Chemical compound

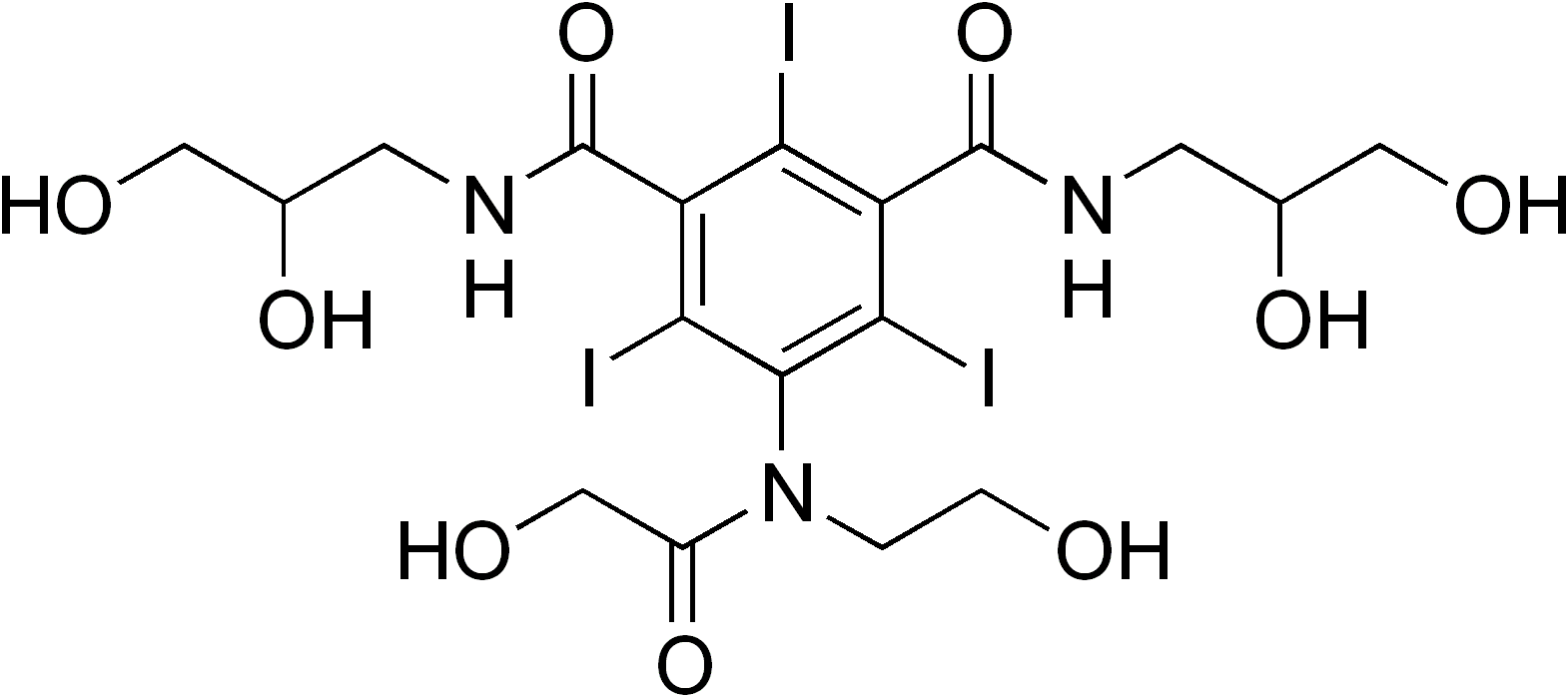

Clinical data
- Trade names: Optiray
- AHFS/Drugs.com: Multum Consumer Information
- Pregnancy category: AU: B1
- ATC code: V08AB07 (WHO)

Legal status
- Legal status: AU: Unscheduled

Pharmacokinetic data
- Protein binding: Low
- Metabolism: None
- Elimination half-life: 90 min
- Excretion: Kidneys

Identifiers
- IUPAC name: 1-N,3-N-bis(2,3-dihydroxypropyl)-5-[2-hydroxy-N-(2-hydroxyethyl)acetamido]-2,4,6-triiodobenzene-1,3-dicarboxamide
- CAS Number: 87771-40-2
- PubChem CID: 3741
- DrugBank: DB09134
- ChemSpider: 3610
- UNII: N3RIB7X24K
- KEGG: D01555
- ChEMBL: ChEMBL1200614
- CompTox Dashboard (EPA): DTXSID2045521
- ECHA InfoCard: 100.118.911

Chemical and physical data
- Formula: C_{18}H_{24}I_{3}N_{3}O_{9}
- Molar mass: 807.115 g·mol^{−1}
- 3D model (JSmol): Interactive image
- SMILES: C(CO)N(C1=C(C(=C(C(=C1I)C(=O)NCC(CO)O)I)C(=O)NCC(CO)O)I)C(=O)CO
- InChI: InChI=1S/C18H24I3N3O9/c19-13-11(17(32)22-3-8(29)5-26)14(20)16(24(1-2-25)10(31)7-28)15(21)12(13)18(33)23-4-9(30)6-27/h8-9,25-30H,1-7H2,(H,22,32)(H,23,33); Key:AMDBBAQNWSUWGN-UHFFFAOYSA-N

Ioversol (INN; trade name Optiray) is an organoiodine compound that is used as a contrast medium. It features both a high iodine content, as well as several hydrophilic groups. It is used in clinical diagnostics including arthrography, angiocardiography and urography.
