= Iodixanol =

Chemical compound

Clinical data
- Trade names: Visipaque
- Other names: 5-[acetyl-[3-[acetyl-[3,5-bis(2,3-dihydroxypropylcarbamoyl)-2,4,6-triiodo-phenyl]amino]-2-hydroxy-propyl]amino]-N,N'-bis(2,3-dihydroxypropyl)-2,4,6-triiodo-benzene-1,3-dicarboxamide
- AHFS/Drugs.com: Multum Consumer Information
- ATC code: V08AB09 (WHO)

Legal status
- Legal status: US: ℞-only

Pharmacokinetic data
- Protein binding: Negligible
- Metabolism: Excreted unchanged
- Elimination half-life: 2.1 hours
- Excretion: Kidney

Identifiers
- IUPAC name: 5-{N-[3-(N-{3,5-bis[(2,3-dihydroxypropyl)carbamoyl]-2,4,6-triiodophenyl}acetamido)-2-hydroxypropyl]acetamido}-1-N,3-N-bis(2,3-dihydroxypropyl)-2,4,6-triiodobenzene-1,3-dicarboxamide
- CAS Number: 92339-11-2
- PubChem CID: 3724
- DrugBank: DB01249
- ChemSpider: 3593
- UNII: HW8W27HTXX
- KEGG: D01474
- ChEBI: CHEBI:31705
- ChEMBL: ChEMBL1200507
- CompTox Dashboard (EPA): DTXSID2045523
- ECHA InfoCard: 100.124.306

Chemical and physical data
- Formula: C_{35}H_{44}I_{6}N_{6}O_{15}
- Molar mass: 1550.191 g·mol^{−1}
- 3D model (JSmol): Interactive image
- SMILES: Ic1c(C(=O)NCC(O)CO)c(I)c(C(=O)NCC(O)CO)c(I)c1N(C(=O)C)CC(O)CN(C(=O)C)c2c(I)c(c(I)c(c2I)C(=O)NCC(O)CO)C(=O)NCC(O)CO
- InChI: InChI=1S/C35H44I6N6O15/c1-13(52)46(30-26(38)20(32(59)42-3-15(54)9-48)24(36)21(27(30)39)33(60)43-4-16(55)10-49)7-19(58)8-47(14(2)53)31-28(40)22(34(61)44-5-17(56)11-50)25(37)23(29(31)41)35(62)45-6-18(57)12-51/h15-19,48-51,54-58H,3-12H2,1-2H3,(H,42,59)(H,43,60)(H,44,61)(H,45,62); Key:NBQNWMBBSKPBAY-UHFFFAOYSA-N

Iodixanol, sold under the brand name Visipaque, is an iodine-containing non-ionic radiocontrast agent.

It is available as a generic medication.

== Medical uses ==
The radio contrast agent is given intravenously for computed tomography (CT) imaging of the head, body, excretory urography and venography. The radiocontrast agent is also given intra-arterially for angiography imaging.

== Adverse effects ==
About 30% of those received intravenous iodixanol injection has warmth, pain, or discomfort at the site of the injection. Other adverse effects include: taste perversion (3.5%), nausea (2.8%), and headache (2.5%).

== Society and culture ==
=== Available forms ===
The contrast can either be given intra-arterialy or intravenously.

== Veterinary uses ==
Iodixanol is also the active ingredient in a number of 'cushion' products used during the centrifugation of stallion semen. It is layered underneath the extended stallion semen allowing for a higher g force to be used with less sperm damage and better recovery rates. Post centrifugation the supernatant above and the cushion below is removed, leaving a concentrated sperm pellet in the conical tube.
