= Iopamidol =

Contrast agent

Clinical data
- Trade names: Isovue, others
- AHFS/Drugs.com: Micromedex Detailed Consumer Information
- Routes of administration: Intravascular, intravenous, intrathecal
- ATC code: V08AB04 (WHO)

Legal status
- Legal status: AU: S4 (Prescription only); UK: POM (Prescription only); US: ℞-only

Identifiers
- IUPAC name: 1-N,3-N-bis(1,3-dihydroxypropan-2-yl)-5-[(2S)-2-hydroxypropanamido]-2,4,6-triiodobenzene-1,3-dicarboxamide
- CAS Number: 60166-93-0
- PubChem CID: 65492
- DrugBank: DB08947
- ChemSpider: 58940
- UNII: JR13W81H44
- KEGG: D01797
- ChEBI: CHEBI:31711
- ChEMBL: ChEMBL1200932
- CompTox Dashboard (EPA): DTXSID1023158
- ECHA InfoCard: 100.056.430

Chemical and physical data
- Formula: C_{17}H_{22}I_{3}N_{3}O_{8}
- Molar mass: 777.089 g·mol^{−1}
- 3D model (JSmol): Interactive image
- SMILES: C[C@@H](C(=O)Nc1c(c(c(c(c1I)C(=O)NC(CO)CO)I)C(=O)NC(CO)CO)I)O
- InChI: InChI=1S/C17H22I3N3O8/c1-6(28)15(29)23-14-12(19)9(16(30)21-7(2-24)3-25)11(18)10(13(14)20)17(31)22-8(4-26)5-27/h6-8,24-28H,2-5H2,1H3,(H,21,30)(H,22,31)(H,23,29)/t6-/m0/s1; Key:XQZXYNRDCRIARQ-LURJTMIESA-N

Iopamidol (INN), sold under the brand name Isovue among others, is a nonionic, low-osmolar iodinated contrast agent, developed by Bracco Diagnostics.

It is available in various concentrations, from 200 to 370 mgI/mL.

== Medical uses ==
Iopamidol is indicated for angiography throughout the cardiovascular system, including cerebral and peripheral arteriography, coronary arteriography and ventriculography, pediatric angiocardiography, selective visceral arteriography and aortography, peripheral venography (phlebography), and adult and pediatric intravenous excretory urography and intravenous adult and pediatric contrast enhancement of computed tomographic (CECT) head and body imaging.

It is also indicated for intrathecal administration in adult neuroradiology including myelography (lumbar, thoracic, cervical, total columnar), and for contrast enhancement of computed tomographic (CECT) cisternography and ventriculography. Isovue-M 200 (lopamidol Injection) is indicated for thoraco-lumbar myelography in children over the age of two years.

As with other iodinated contrast agents there are concerns regarding safety, particularly relating to effects on renal function and allergic type reaction. Early generations of intravenous (IV) contrast carried considerable nephrotoxicity, necessitating continual assessment of renal function. IV and PO (per os, by mouth) fluids are encouraged post operation to facilitate excretion of contrast. Shellfish allergies have previously thought to have crossover with iodine allergies with caution being advised with regards to the use of iodinated contrast in patients with shellfish, however shellfish have been demonstrated to be due to proteins produced by the organisms, not due to iodine.
