= Isoprednidene =

Chemical compound

Clinical data
- Other names: StC 407; 6-Dehydro-16-methylene hydrocortisone; 11β,17α,21-Trihydroxy-16-methylenepregna-4,6-diene-3,20-dione
- Drug class: Corticosteroid; Glucocorticoid

Identifiers
- IUPAC name: (8S,9S,10R,11S,13S,14S,17R)-11,17-Dihydroxy-17-(2-hydroxyacetyl)-10,13-dimethyl-16-methylidene-1,2,8,9,11,12,14,15-octahydrocyclopenta[a]phenanthren-3-one
- CAS Number: 17332-61-5
- PubChem CID: 20055344
- ChemSpider: 16736652
- UNII: 4G6A72XC0I
- ChEMBL: ChEMBL2107195
- CompTox Dashboard (EPA): DTXSID901043171

Chemical and physical data
- Formula: C_{22}H_{28}O_{5}
- Molar mass: 372.461 g·mol^{−1}
- 3D model (JSmol): Interactive image
- SMILES: C[C@]12CCC(=O)C=C1C=C[C@@H]3[C@@H]2[C@H](C[C@]4([C@H]3CC(=C)[C@@]4(C(=O)CO)O)C)O
- InChI: InChI=1S/C22H28O5/c1-12-8-16-15-5-4-13-9-14(24)6-7-20(13,2)19(15)17(25)10-21(16,3)22(12,27)18(26)11-23/h4-5,9,15-17,19,23,25,27H,1,6-8,10-11H2,2-3H3/t15-,16-,17-,19+,20-,21-,22-/m0/s1; Key:MAAGHJOYEMWLNT-CWNVBEKCSA-N

Isoprednidene (developmental code name StC 407) is a synthetic glucocorticoid corticosteroid which was never marketed.
