= Imexon =

Chemical compound

Clinical data
- ATC code: none

Identifiers
- IUPAC name: 4-imino-1,3-diazabicyclo[3.1.0]hexan-2-one
- CAS Number: 59643-91-3
- PubChem CID: 68791
- ChemSpider: 62031
- UNII: 8F63U28T2V
- KEGG: D08932
- CompTox Dashboard (EPA): DTXSID1046895
- ECHA InfoCard: 100.056.199

Chemical and physical data
- Formula: C_{4}H_{5}N_{3}O
- Molar mass: 111.104 g·mol^{−1}
- 3D model (JSmol): Interactive image
- SMILES: O=C1/N=C(/N)C2N1C2
- InChI: InChI=1S/C4H5N3O/c5-3-2-1-7(2)4(8)6-3/h2H,1H2,(H2,5,6,8); Key:BIXBBIPTYBJTRY-UHFFFAOYSA-N

Imexon (INN, trade name Amplimexon) is a substance that is being studied in the treatment of some types of cancer, including pancreatic, lung, breast, prostate, melanoma, and multiple myeloma. It is a cyanoaziridine derivative.
