= Radiocontrast agent =

Substance which enhances visibility in X-ray-based imaging

Radiocontrast agents are substances used to enhance the visibility of internal structures in X-ray-based imaging techniques such as computed tomography (contrast CT), projectional radiography, and fluoroscopy. Radiocontrast agents are typically iodine, or more rarely barium sulfate. The contrast agents absorb external X-rays, resulting in decreased exposure on the X-ray detector. This is different from radiopharmaceuticals used in nuclear medicine which emit radiation.

Magnetic resonance imaging (MRI) functions through different principles and thus MRI contrast agents have a different mode of action. These compounds work by altering the magnetic properties of nearby hydrogen nuclei.

== Types and uses ==
Radiocontrast agents used in X-ray examinations can be grouped in positive (iodinated agents, barium sulfate), and negative agents (air, carbon dioxide, methylcellulose).

=== Iodine (circulatory system) ===
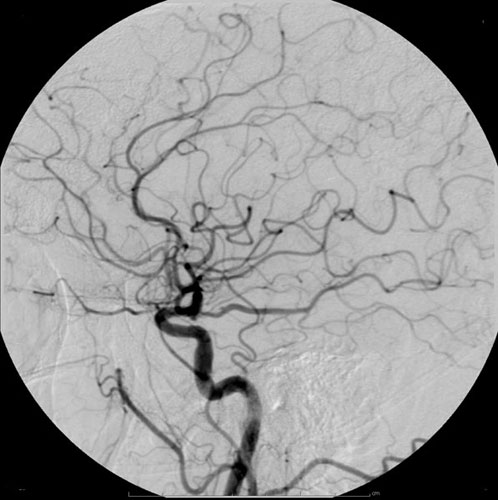
An iodine-based contrast in cerebral angiography

Iodinated contrast contains iodine. It is the main type of radiocontrast used for intravenous administration. Iodine has a particular advantage as a contrast agent for radiography because its innermost electron ("k-shell") binding energy is 33.2 keV, similar to the average energy of x-rays used in diagnostic radiography. When the incident x-ray energy is closer to the k-edge of the atom it encounters, photoelectric absorption is more likely to occur.

Its uses include:

- Contrast CTs
- Angiography (arterial investigations)
- Venography (venous investigations)
- VCUG (voiding cystourethrography)
- HSG (hysterosalpingogram)
- IVU (intravenous urography)

Organic iodine molecules used for contrast include iohexol, iodixanol and ioversol.

=== Barium sulfate (digestive system) ===
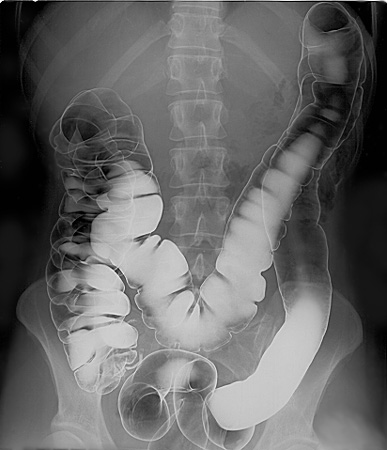
A human intestinal tract, as imaged via double-contrast barium enema, highlighting the interior of the colon

Barium sulfate is mainly used in the imaging of the digestive system. The substance exists as a water-insoluble white powder that is made into a slurry with water and administered directly into the gastrointestinal tract.

- Upper gastrointestinal series
- Barium enema (large bowel investigation) and DCBE (double contrast barium enema).
- Barium swallow (oesophageal investigation)
- Barium meal (stomach investigation) and double contrast barium meal
- Barium follow through (stomach and small bowel investigation)
- CT pneumocolon / virtual colonoscopy

Barium sulfate, an insoluble white powder, is typically used for enhancing contrast in the GI tract. Depending on how it is to be administered the compound is mixed with water, thickeners, de-clumping agents, and flavourings to make the contrast agent. As the barium sulfate does not dissolve, this type of contrast agent is an opaque white mixture. It is only used in the digestive tract; it is usually swallowed as a barium sulfate suspension or administered as an enema. After the examination, it leaves the body with the feces.

=== Air ===
Air can be used as a contrast material because it is less radio-opaque than the tissues it is defining. A double contrast barium enema, or DCBE, uses both air and barium together. In an air arthrogram, where air alone is used as a contrast medium, the injection of air into a joint cavity allows the cartilage covering the ends of the bones to be visualized.

Before the advent of modern neuroimaging techniques, air or other gases were used as contrast agents employed to displace the cerebrospinal fluid in the brain while performing a pneumoencephalography. Sometimes called an "air study", this once common yet highly-unpleasant procedure was used to enhance the outline of structures in the brain, looking for shape distortions caused by the presence of lesions.

=== Carbon dioxide ===
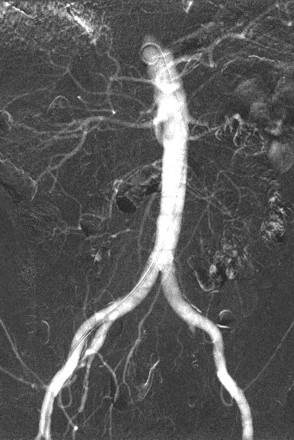
A CO_{2} angiogram showing abdominal aorta, visceral arteries and iliac arteries

Carbon dioxide also has a role in angioplasty. It is low-risk as it is a natural product with no risk of allergic potential. However, it can be used only below the diaphragm as there is a risk of embolism in neurovascular procedures. It must be used carefully to avoid contamination with room air when injected. It is a negative contrast agent in that it displaces blood when injected intravascularly.

=== Discontinued agents ===
==== Thorotrast ====
Thorotrast was a contrast agent based on thorium dioxide, which is radioactive. It was first introduced in 1929. While it provided good image enhancement, its use was abandoned in the late 1950s since it turned out to be carcinogenic. Given that the substance remained in the bodies of those to whom it was administered, it gave a continuous radiation exposure and was associated with a risk of cancers of the liver, bile ducts and bones, as well as higher rates of hematological malignancy (leukemia and lymphoma). Thorotrast may have been administered to millions of patients prior to being disused.

==== Nonsoluble substances ====
In the past, some non water-soluble contrast agents were used. One such substance was iofendylate (trade names: Pantopaque, Myodil) which was an iodinated oil-based substance that was commonly used in myelography. Due to it being oil-based, it was recommended that the physician remove it from the patient at the end of the procedure. This was a painful and difficult step and because complete removal could not always be achieved, iofendylate's persistence in the body might sometimes lead to arachnoiditis, a potentially painful and debilitating lifelong disorder of the spine. Iofendylate's use ceased when water-soluble agents (such as metrizamide) became available in the late 1970s. Also, with the advent of MRI, myelography became much less-commonly performed.

== Adverse effects ==
Modern iodinated contrast agents – especially non-ionic compounds – are generally well tolerated. The adverse effects of radiocontrast can be subdivided into type A reactions (e.g. thyrotoxicosis), and type B reactions (hypersensitivity reactions: allergy and non-allergy reactions [formerly called anaphylactoid reactions]).

Patients receiving contrast via IV typically experience a hot feeling around the throat, and this hot sensation gradually moves down to the pelvic area.

Risk factors for the acquisition of contrast medium-induced hypersensitivity reactions are history of a previous contrast medium-hypersensitivity, acute allergy, use of the culprit contrast agent and documentation/management errors

The documentation of adverse drug reactions to contrast media should be documented precisely so that the patient receives adequate prophylaxis if contrast medium is administered again.

=== Contrast induced nephropathy ===
Iodinated contrast may be toxic to the kidneys, especially when given via the arteries prior to studies such as catheter coronary angiography. Non-ionic contrast agents, which are almost exclusively used in computed tomography studies, have not been shown to cause CIN when given intravenously at doses needed for CT studies.

=== Thyroid dysfunction ===
Iodinated radiocontrast can induce overactivity (hyperthyroidism) and underactivity (hypothyroidism) of the thyroid gland. The risk of either condition developing after a single examination is 2–3 times that of those who have not undergone a scan with iodinated contrast. Thyroid underactivity is mediated by two phenomena called the Plummer and Wolff–Chaikoff effect, where iodine suppresses the production of thyroid hormones; this is usually temporary but there is an association with longer-term thyroid underactivity. Some other people show the opposite effect, called Jod-Basedow phenomenon, where the iodine induces overproduction of thyroid hormone; this may be the result of underlying thyroid disease (such as nodules or Graves' disease) or previous iodine deficiency. Children exposed to iodinated contrast during pregnancy may develop hypothyroidism after birth and monitoring of the thyroid function is recommended.

== See also ==
- Contrast agent – Substance used in medical imaging
- Medical imaging – Technique and process of creating visual representations of the interior of a body
- Radiology – Medical specialty for imaging procedures
