= Indium (111In) igovomab =

Chemical compound

Indium (^{111}In) igovomab
Monoclonal antibody
- Type: F(ab')_{2} fragment
- Source: Mouse
- Target: CA-125

Clinical data
- ATC code: none

Identifiers
- CAS Number: 171656-50-1
- ChemSpider: none
- UNII: GBK36SFC9C

Indium (^{111}In) igovomab (trade name Indimacis-125) was a mouse monoclonal antibody for the diagnosis of ovarian cancer.

Linked to the chelating agent DTPA and labelled with Indium-111, it was used for imaging (radio-immuno scintigraphy) of the cancer. The drug is no longer available.
