= List of MeSH codes (D02) =

The following is a partial list of the "D" codes for Medical Subject Headings (MeSH), as defined by the United States National Library of Medicine (NLM).

This list continues the information at List of MeSH codes (D01). Codes following these are found at List of MeSH codes (D03). For other MeSH codes, see List of MeSH codes.

The source for this content is the set of 2024 MeSH Trees from the NLM.

== MeSH D02 – organic chemicals ==
=== MeSH D02.033 – alcohols ===
==== MeSH D02.033.100 – amino alcohols ====
- MeSH D02.033.100.291 – ethanolamines
- MeSH D02.033.100.291.057 – albuterol
- MeSH D02.033.100.291.057.125 – albuterol, iporatropium drug combination
- MeSH D02.033.100.291.057.500 – levalbuterol
- MeSH D02.033.100.291.057.750 – salmeterol xinafoate
- MeSH D02.033.100.291.057.750.500 – fluticasone-salmeterol drug combination
- MeSH D02.033.100.291.211 – choline
- MeSH D02.033.100.291.211.500 – platelet activating factor
- MeSH D02.033.100.291.231 – clenbuterol
- MeSH D02.033.100.291.274 – deanol
- MeSH D02.033.100.291.310 – epinephrine
- MeSH D02.033.100.291.310.500 – racepinephrine
- MeSH D02.033.100.291.375 – ethanolamine
- MeSH D02.033.100.291.410 – 2-hydroxyphenethylamine
- MeSH D02.033.100.291.425 – formoterol fumarate
- MeSH D02.033.100.291.439 – isoproterenol
- MeSH D02.033.100.291.460 – labetalol
- MeSH D02.033.100.291.465 – metaproterenol
- MeSH D02.033.100.291.465.300 – fenoterol
- MeSH D02.033.100.291.480 – midodrine
- MeSH D02.033.100.291.491 – nebivolol
- MeSH D02.033.100.291.502 – norepinephrine
- MeSH D02.033.100.291.502.651 – normetanephrine
- MeSH D02.033.100.291.525 – octopamine
- MeSH D02.033.100.291.617 – phenylephrine
- MeSH D02.033.100.291.617.300 – etilefrine
- MeSH D02.033.100.291.630 – procaterol
- MeSH D02.033.100.291.805 – sotalol
- MeSH D02.033.100.291.870 – synephrine
- MeSH D02.033.100.291.905 – terbutaline
- MeSH D02.033.100.350 – heptaminol
- MeSH D02.033.100.400 – isoetharine
- MeSH D02.033.100.624 – propanolamines
- MeSH D02.033.100.624.151 – carvedilol
- MeSH D02.033.100.624.302 – ephedrine
- MeSH D02.033.100.624.380 – histidinol
- MeSH D02.033.100.624.427 – isoxsuprine
- MeSH D02.033.100.624.536 – methoxamine
- MeSH D02.033.100.624.698 – phenoxypropanolamines
- MeSH D02.033.100.624.698.025 – acebutolol
- MeSH D02.033.100.624.698.055 – alprenolol
- MeSH D02.033.100.624.698.055.200 – dihydroalprenolol
- MeSH D02.033.100.624.698.070 – atenolol
- MeSH D02.033.100.624.698.077 – betaxolol
- MeSH D02.033.100.624.698.085 – bisoprolol
- MeSH D02.033.100.624.698.115 – bunolol
- MeSH D02.033.100.624.698.115.500 – levobunolol
- MeSH D02.033.100.624.698.146 – bupranolol
- MeSH D02.033.100.624.698.207 – carteolol
- MeSH D02.033.100.624.698.268 – celiprolol
- MeSH D02.033.100.624.698.542 – metinpranolol
- MeSH D02.033.100.624.698.573 – metoprolol
- MeSH D02.033.100.624.698.601 – nadolol
- MeSH D02.033.100.624.698.633 – oxprenolol
- MeSH D02.033.100.624.698.688 – penbutolol
- MeSH D02.033.100.624.698.699 – pindolol
- MeSH D02.033.100.624.698.699.420 – iodocyanopindolol
- MeSH D02.033.100.624.698.705 – practolol
- MeSH D02.033.100.624.698.708 – prenalterol
- MeSH D02.033.100.624.698.711 – propranolol
- MeSH D02.033.100.624.698.855 – xamoterol
- MeSH D02.033.100.624.706 – phenylpropanolamine
- MeSH D02.033.100.624.706.400 – p-hydroxynorephedrine
- MeSH D02.033.100.624.706.500 – metaraminol
- MeSH D02.033.100.624.706.750 – tolterodine tartrate
- MeSH D02.033.100.624.853 – pseudoephedrine
- MeSH D02.033.100.624.870 – ritodrine
- MeSH D02.033.100.624.890 – suloctidil
- MeSH D02.033.100.624.915 – timolol
- MeSH D02.033.100.624.915.500 – brimonidine tartrate, timolol maleate drug combination
- MeSH D02.033.100.700 – sphingosine
- MeSH D02.033.100.700.350 – fingolimod hydrochloride
- MeSH D02.033.100.700.700 – psychosine

==== MeSH D02.033.160 – benzyl alcohols ====
- MeSH D02.033.160.100 – benzyl alcohol

==== MeSH D02.033.260 – chlorohydrins ====
- MeSH D02.033.260.100 – alpha-chlorohydrin
- MeSH D02.033.260.220 – chlorobutanol
- MeSH D02.033.260.335 – ethchlorvynol
- MeSH D02.033.260.350 – ethylene chlorohydrin

==== MeSH D02.033.318 – dolichols ====
- MeSH D02.033.318.250 – dolichol phosphates

==== MeSH D02.033.375 – ethanol ====
- MeSH D02.033.375.135 – blood alcohol content
- MeSH D02.033.375.270 – ethamoxytriphetol
- MeSH D02.033.375.291 – ethanolamines
- MeSH D02.033.375.310 – ethylene chlorohydrin
- MeSH D02.033.375.534 – mercaptoethanol
- MeSH D02.033.375.650 – phenylethyl alcohol
- MeSH D02.033.375.880 – trifluoroethanol

==== MeSH D02.033.415 – fatty alcohols ====
- MeSH D02.033.415.054 – acetogenins
- MeSH D02.033.415.110 – butanols
- MeSH D02.033.415.110.175 – 1-butanol
- MeSH D02.033.415.110.220 – chlorobutanol
- MeSH D02.033.415.110.855 – tert-butyl alcohol
- MeSH D02.033.415.220 – dodecanol
- MeSH D02.033.415.220.720 – sodium dodecyl sulfate
- MeSH D02.033.415.400 – farnesol
- MeSH D02.033.415.500 – heptanol
- MeSH D02.033.415.510 – hexanols
- MeSH D02.033.415.510.500 – cyclohexanols
- MeSH D02.033.415.510.500.303 – desvenlafaxine succinate
- MeSH D02.033.415.510.500.454 – eucalyptol
- MeSH D02.033.415.510.500.605 – menthol
- MeSH D02.033.415.510.500.802 – tramadol
- MeSH D02.033.415.510.500.901 – venlafaxine hydrochloride
- MeSH D02.033.415.600 – octanols
- MeSH D02.033.415.600.600 – 1-octanol
- MeSH D02.033.415.640 – pentanols
- MeSH D02.033.415.900 – sodium tetradecyl sulfate

==== MeSH D02.033.455 – glycols ====
- MeSH D02.033.455.125 – butylene glycols
- MeSH D02.033.455.125.125 – busulfan
- MeSH D02.033.455.250 – ethylene glycols
- MeSH D02.033.455.250.130 – chloral hydrate
- MeSH D02.033.455.250.130.150 – chloralose
- MeSH D02.033.455.250.268 – ethylene glycol
- MeSH D02.033.455.250.610 – methoxyhydroxyphenylglycol
- MeSH D02.033.455.250.700 – polyethylene glycols
- MeSH D02.033.455.250.700.150 – cetomacrogol
- MeSH D02.033.455.250.700.485 – hydrogel
- MeSH D02.033.455.250.700.620 – nonoxynol
- MeSH D02.033.455.250.700.660 – octoxynol
- MeSH D02.033.455.250.700.680 – poloxamer 407
- MeSH D02.033.455.250.700.682 – poloxamers
- MeSH D02.033.455.250.700.685 – polyhydroxyethyl methacrylate
- MeSH D02.033.455.250.700.690 – polysorbates
- MeSH D02.033.455.706 – propylene glycols
- MeSH D02.033.455.706.100 – alpha-chlorohydrin
- MeSH D02.033.455.706.300 – chloramphenicol
- MeSH D02.033.455.706.300.850 – thiamphenicol
- MeSH D02.033.455.706.345 – chlorphenesin
- MeSH D02.033.455.706.517 – mephenesin
- MeSH D02.033.455.706.690 – pentaerythritol tetranitrate
- MeSH D02.033.455.706.725 – propylene glycol
- MeSH D02.033.455.706.900 – tromethamine
- MeSH D02.033.455.843 – sphingosine

==== MeSH D02.033.755 – propanols ====
- MeSH D02.033.755.600 – 1-propanol
- MeSH D02.033.755.615 – 2-propanol
- MeSH D02.033.755.624 – propanolamines
- MeSH D02.033.755.624.302 – ephedrine
- MeSH D02.033.755.624.380 – histidinol
- MeSH D02.033.755.624.427 – isoxsuprine
- MeSH D02.033.755.624.536 – methoxamine
- MeSH D02.033.755.624.605 – nylidrin
- MeSH D02.033.755.624.675 – oxyfedrine
- MeSH D02.033.755.624.706 – phenylpropanolamine
- MeSH D02.033.755.624.706.400 – p-hydroxynorephedrine
- MeSH D02.033.755.624.706.500 – metaraminol
- MeSH D02.033.755.624.870 – ritodrine
- MeSH D02.033.755.624.890 – suloctidil
- MeSH D02.033.755.624.915 – timolol

==== MeSH D02.033.800 – sugar alcohols ====
- MeSH D02.033.800.175 – dithioerythritol
- MeSH D02.033.800.196 – dithiothreitol
- MeSH D02.033.800.329 – erythritol
- MeSH D02.033.800.329.225 – erythrityl tetranitrate
- MeSH D02.033.800.400 – galactitol
- MeSH D02.033.800.400.350 – dianhydrogalactitol
- MeSH D02.033.800.400.500 – mitolactol
- MeSH D02.033.800.519 – inositol
- MeSH D02.033.800.519.400 – inositol phosphates
- MeSH D02.033.800.519.400.350 – inositol 1,4,5-trisphosphate
- MeSH D02.033.800.519.400.700 – phytic acid
- MeSH D02.033.800.609 – mannitol
- MeSH D02.033.800.609.450 – mannitol phosphates
- MeSH D02.033.800.609.500 – mitobronitol
- MeSH D02.033.800.780 – ribitol
- MeSH D02.033.800.813 – sorbitol
- MeSH D02.033.800.813.480 – isosorbide
- MeSH D02.033.800.813.480.500 – isosorbide dinitrate
- MeSH D02.033.800.813.550 – meglumine
- MeSH D02.033.800.813.550.500 – diatrizoate meglumine
- MeSH D02.033.800.813.550.600 – iothalamate meglumine
- MeSH D02.033.800.875 – triose sugar alcohols
- MeSH D02.033.800.875.500 – glycerol
- MeSH D02.033.800.875.750 – glycerophosphates
- MeSH D02.033.800.875.750.449 – glycerylphosphorylcholine
- MeSH D02.033.800.875.875 – glyceryl ethers
- MeSH D02.033.800.875.875.750 – phospholipid ethers
- MeSH D02.033.800.936 – xylitol

=== MeSH D02.047 – aldehydes ===
==== MeSH D02.047.064 – acetaldehyde ====
- MeSH D02.047.064.586 – paraldehyde

==== MeSH D02.047.407 – formaldehyde ====
- MeSH D02.047.407.518 – formocresols

==== MeSH D02.047.587 – glyceraldehyde ====
- MeSH D02.047.587.450 – glyceraldehyde 3-phosphate

==== MeSH D02.047.644 – glyoxal ====
- MeSH D02.047.644.620 – phenylglyoxal
- MeSH D02.047.644.650 – pyruvaldehyde

==== MeSH D02.047.700 – malondialdehyde ====
- MeSH D02.047.700.700 – thiobarbituric acid reactive substances

=== MeSH D02.065 – amides ===
==== MeSH D02.065.064 – acetamides ====
- MeSH D02.065.064.150 – 2-acetylaminofluorene
- MeSH D02.065.064.150.100 – acetoxyacetylaminofluorene
- MeSH D02.065.064.150.400 – hydroxyacetylaminofluorene
- MeSH D02.065.064.189 – allylisopropylacetamide
- MeSH D02.065.064.294 – benzeneacetamides
- MeSH D02.065.064.294.088 – bufexamac
- MeSH D02.065.064.400 – iodoacetamide
- MeSH D02.065.064.416 – lacosamide
- MeSH D02.065.064.432 – levetiracetam
- MeSH D02.065.064.463 – linezolid
- MeSH D02.065.064.525 – oseltamivir
- MeSH D02.065.064.650 – piracetam
- MeSH D02.065.064.786 – thioacetamide

==== MeSH D02.065.122 – acrylamides ====
- MeSH D02.065.122.015 – acrylamide

==== MeSH D02.065.199 – anilides ====
- MeSH D02.065.199.092 – acetanilides
- MeSH D02.065.199.092.040 – acetaminophen
- MeSH D02.065.199.092.250 – diamfenetide
- MeSH D02.065.199.092.325 – etidocaine
- MeSH D02.065.199.092.450 – inosine pranobex
- MeSH D02.065.199.092.500 – lidocaine
- MeSH D02.065.199.092.700 – phenacetin
- MeSH D02.065.199.092.800 – practolol
- MeSH D02.065.199.092.900 – trimecaine
- MeSH D02.065.199.200 – benzoylarginine nitroanilide
- MeSH D02.065.199.239 – bupivacaine
- MeSH D02.065.199.239.500 – levobupivacaine
- MeSH D02.065.199.326 – carbanilides
- MeSH D02.065.199.326.400 – imidocarb
- MeSH D02.065.199.326.550 – nicarbazin
- MeSH D02.065.199.350 – carboxin
- MeSH D02.065.199.385 – encainide
- MeSH D02.065.199.420 – flutamide
- MeSH D02.065.199.750 – prilocaine
- MeSH D02.065.199.750.500 – lidocaine, prilocaine drug combination
- MeSH D02.065.199.789 – propanil
- MeSH D02.065.199.825 – ropivacaine
- MeSH D02.065.199.860 – salicylanilides
- MeSH D02.065.199.860.470 – niclosamide
- MeSH D02.065.199.860.500 – oxyclozanide
- MeSH D02.065.199.860.600 – rafoxanide
- MeSH D02.065.199.920 – tocainide
- MeSH D02.065.199.960 – vorinostat

==== MeSH D02.065.277 – benzamides ====
- MeSH D02.065.277.034 – amisulpride
- MeSH D02.065.277.051 – axitinib
- MeSH D02.065.277.067 – bezafibrate
- MeSH D02.065.277.135 – cisapride
- MeSH D02.065.277.194 – deet
- MeSH D02.065.277.225 – dinitolmide
- MeSH D02.065.277.431 – hippurates
- MeSH D02.065.277.431.192 – aminohippuric acids
- MeSH D02.065.277.431.192.100 – p-aminohippuric acid
- MeSH D02.065.277.431.579 – ortho-Iodohippuric acid
- MeSH D02.065.277.456 – imatinib mesylate
- MeSH D02.065.277.480 – indoramin
- MeSH D02.065.277.573 – metoclopramide
- MeSH D02.065.277.600 – moclobemide
- MeSH D02.065.277.650 – procainamide
- MeSH D02.065.277.727 – procarbazine
- MeSH D02.065.277.761 – raclopride
- MeSH D02.065.277.796 – remoxipride
- MeSH D02.065.277.866 – sulpiride

==== MeSH D02.065.313 – ceramides ====
- MeSH D02.065.313.250 – cerebrosides
- MeSH D02.065.313.250.450 – galactosylceramides
- MeSH D02.065.313.250.490 – glucosylceramides
- MeSH D02.065.313.425 – globosides
- MeSH D02.065.313.612 – lactosylceramides
- MeSH D02.065.313.906 – trihexosylceramides

==== MeSH D02.065.463 – formamides ====
- MeSH D02.065.463.387 – dimethylformamide

==== MeSH D02.065.589 – lactams ====
- MeSH D02.065.589.099 – beta-lactams
- MeSH D02.065.589.099.124 – carbapenems
- MeSH D02.065.589.099.124.300 – thienamycins
- MeSH D02.065.589.099.124.300.500 – imipenem
- MeSH D02.065.589.099.249 – cephalosporins
- MeSH D02.065.589.099.249.150 – cefamandole
- MeSH D02.065.589.099.249.150.160 – cefoperazone
- MeSH D02.065.589.099.249.160 – cefazolin
- MeSH D02.065.589.099.249.177 – cefonicid
- MeSH D02.065.589.099.249.185 – cefsulodin
- MeSH D02.065.589.099.249.190 – cephacetrile
- MeSH D02.065.589.099.249.190.190 – cefotaxime
- MeSH D02.065.589.099.249.190.190.115 – cefixime
- MeSH D02.065.589.099.249.190.190.125 – cefmenoxime
- MeSH D02.065.589.099.249.190.190.135 – cefotiam
- MeSH D02.065.589.099.249.190.190.145 – ceftizoxime
- MeSH D02.065.589.099.249.190.190.155 – ceftriaxone
- MeSH D02.065.589.099.249.190.190.165 – cefuroxime
- MeSH D02.065.589.099.249.190.210 – cephalothin
- MeSH D02.065.589.099.249.190.230 – cephapirin
- MeSH D02.065.589.099.249.200 – cephalexin
- MeSH D02.065.589.099.249.200.155 – cefaclor
- MeSH D02.065.589.099.249.200.165 – cefadroxil
- MeSH D02.065.589.099.249.200.165.125 – cefatrizine
- MeSH D02.065.589.099.249.200.180 – cephaloglycin
- MeSH D02.065.589.099.249.200.185 – cephradine
- MeSH D02.065.589.099.249.210 – cephaloridine
- MeSH D02.065.589.099.249.210.150 – ceftazidime
- MeSH D02.065.589.099.249.250 – cephamycins
- MeSH D02.065.589.099.249.250.177 – cefmetazole
- MeSH D02.065.589.099.249.250.199 – cefotetan
- MeSH D02.065.589.099.249.250.222 – cefoxitin
- MeSH D02.065.589.099.374 – clavulanic acids
- MeSH D02.065.589.099.374.160 – clavulanic acid
- MeSH D02.065.589.099.374.160.060 – amoxicillin-potassium clavulanate combination
- MeSH D02.065.589.099.500 – monobactams
- MeSH D02.065.589.099.500.044 – aztreonam
- MeSH D02.065.589.099.625 – moxalactam
- MeSH D02.065.589.099.750 – penicillins
- MeSH D02.065.589.099.750.124 – amdinocillin
- MeSH D02.065.589.099.750.124.036 – amdinocillin pivoxil
- MeSH D02.065.589.099.750.249 – cyclacillin
- MeSH D02.065.589.099.750.500 – methicillin
- MeSH D02.065.589.099.750.562 – nafcillin
- MeSH D02.065.589.099.750.625 – oxacillin
- MeSH D02.065.589.099.750.625.150 – cloxacillin
- MeSH D02.065.589.099.750.625.150.205 – dicloxacillin
- MeSH D02.065.589.099.750.625.150.250 – floxacillin
- MeSH D02.065.589.099.750.687 – penicillanic acid
- MeSH D02.065.589.099.750.750 – penicillin g
- MeSH D02.065.589.099.750.750.050 – ampicillin
- MeSH D02.065.589.099.750.750.050.050 – amoxicillin
- MeSH D02.065.589.099.750.750.050.050.060 – amoxicillin-potassium clavulanate combination
- MeSH D02.065.589.099.750.750.050.075 – azlocillin
- MeSH D02.065.589.099.750.750.050.500 – mezlocillin
- MeSH D02.065.589.099.750.750.050.650 – piperacillin
- MeSH D02.065.589.099.750.750.050.700 – pivampicillin
- MeSH D02.065.589.099.750.750.050.900 – talampicillin
- MeSH D02.065.589.099.750.750.170 – carbenicillin
- MeSH D02.065.589.099.750.750.170.200 – carfecillin
- MeSH D02.065.589.099.750.750.685 – penicillin g, benzathine
- MeSH D02.065.589.099.750.750.695 – penicillin g, procaine
- MeSH D02.065.589.099.750.750.875 – sulbenicillin
- MeSH D02.065.589.099.750.781 – penicillin v
- MeSH D02.065.589.099.750.812 – sulbactam
- MeSH D02.065.589.099.750.875 – ticarcillin
- MeSH D02.065.589.200 – caprolactam
- MeSH D02.065.589.327 – lactams, macrocyclic

==== MeSH D02.065.690 – polyunsaturated alkamides ====
- MeSH D02.065.690.500 – capsaicin

==== MeSH D02.065.793 – salicylamides ====
- MeSH D02.065.793.650 – salicylanilides
- MeSH D02.065.793.650.470 – niclosamide
- MeSH D02.065.793.650.500 – oxyclozanide
- MeSH D02.065.793.650.600 – rafoxanide

==== MeSH D02.065.884 – sulfonamides ====
- MeSH D02.065.884.060 – benzenesulfonamides
- MeSH D02.065.884.120 – benzolamide
- MeSH D02.065.884.150 – bumetanide
- MeSH D02.065.884.344 – chloramines
- MeSH D02.065.884.365 – chlorthalidone
- MeSH D02.065.884.390 – clopamide
- MeSH D02.065.884.485 – dichlorphenamide
- MeSH D02.065.884.500 – ethoxzolamide
- MeSH D02.065.884.540 – indapamide
- MeSH D02.065.884.570 – mafenide
- MeSH D02.065.884.575 – mefruside
- MeSH D02.065.884.600 – metolazone
- MeSH D02.065.884.625 – probenecid
- MeSH D02.065.884.725 – sulfanilamides
- MeSH D02.065.884.725.300 – furosemide
- MeSH D02.065.884.725.650 – sulfacetamide
- MeSH D02.065.884.725.700 – sulfachlorpyridazine
- MeSH D02.065.884.725.755 – sulfadiazine
- MeSH D02.065.884.725.755.800 – silver sulfadiazine
- MeSH D02.065.884.725.760 – sulfadimethoxine
- MeSH D02.065.884.725.765 – sulfadoxine
- MeSH D02.065.884.725.810 – sulfaguanidine
- MeSH D02.065.884.725.850 – sulfalene
- MeSH D02.065.884.725.853 – sulfamerazine
- MeSH D02.065.884.725.857 – sulfameter
- MeSH D02.065.884.725.862 – sulfamethazine
- MeSH D02.065.884.725.867 – sulfamethoxazole
- MeSH D02.065.884.725.867.500 – trimethoprim-sulfamethoxazole combination
- MeSH D02.065.884.725.872 – sulfamethoxypyridazine
- MeSH D02.065.884.725.877 – sulfamonomethoxine
- MeSH D02.065.884.725.882 – sulfamoxole
- MeSH D02.065.884.725.887 – sulfaphenazole
- MeSH D02.065.884.725.900 – sulfapyridine
- MeSH D02.065.884.725.925 – sulfaquinoxaline
- MeSH D02.065.884.725.935 – sulfathiazoles
- MeSH D02.065.884.725.935.813 – sulfamethizole
- MeSH D02.065.884.725.940 – sulfisomidine
- MeSH D02.065.884.725.945 – sulfisoxazole
- MeSH D02.065.884.730 – sulfasalazine
- MeSH D02.065.884.750 – sumatriptan
- MeSH D02.065.884.891 – torsemide
- MeSH D02.065.884.919 – vemurafenib
- MeSH D02.065.884.975 – xipamide
- MeSH D02.065.884.987 – zonisamide

==== MeSH D02.065.900 – thioamides ====
- MeSH D02.065.900.890 – thioacetamide

==== MeSH D02.065.950 – urea ====
- MeSH D02.065.950.058 – allantoin
- MeSH D02.065.950.117 – biureas
- MeSH D02.065.950.130 – biuret
- MeSH D02.065.950.160 – bromisoval
- MeSH D02.065.950.395 – hydroxyurea
- MeSH D02.065.950.511 – methylurea compounds
- MeSH D02.065.950.594 – nitrosourea compounds
- MeSH D02.065.950.681 – phenylurea compounds
- MeSH D02.065.950.828 – sulfonylurea compounds
- MeSH D02.065.950.898 – thiourea

=== MeSH D02.078 – amidines ===
==== MeSH D02.078.100 – benzamidines ====
- MeSH D02.078.100.260 – diminazene
- MeSH D02.078.100.700 – pentamidine

==== MeSH D02.078.370 – guanidines ====
- MeSH D02.078.370.060 – agmatine
- MeSH D02.078.370.120 – bethanidine
- MeSH D02.078.370.141 – biguanides
- MeSH D02.078.370.141.075 – buformin
- MeSH D02.078.370.141.100 – chlorhexidine
- MeSH D02.078.370.141.125 – chloroguanide
- MeSH D02.078.370.141.450 – metformin
- MeSH D02.078.370.141.700 – phenformin
- MeSH D02.078.370.200 – cimetidine
- MeSH D02.078.370.280 – creatine
- MeSH D02.078.370.380 – gabexate
- MeSH D02.078.370.435 – guanabenz
- MeSH D02.078.370.460 – guanethidine
- MeSH D02.078.370.465 – guanfacine
- MeSH D02.078.370.472 – guanidine
- MeSH D02.078.370.500 – impromidine
- MeSH D02.078.370.510 – 3-iodobenzylguanidine
- MeSH D02.078.370.570 – methylguanidine
- MeSH D02.078.370.600 – mitoguazone
- MeSH D02.078.370.649 – nitrosoguanidines
- MeSH D02.078.370.649.400 – methylnitronitrosoguanidine
- MeSH D02.078.370.729 – pinacidil
- MeSH D02.078.370.810 – robenidine
- MeSH D02.078.370.853 – sulfaguanidine

=== MeSH D02.092 – amines ===
==== MeSH D02.092.063 – amino alcohols ====
- MeSH D02.092.063.291 – ethanolamines
- MeSH D02.092.063.291.057 – albuterol
- MeSH D02.092.063.291.211 – choline
- MeSH D02.092.063.291.211.500 – platelet activating factor
- MeSH D02.092.063.291.231 – clenbuterol
- MeSH D02.092.063.291.274 – deanol
- MeSH D02.092.063.291.310 – epinephrine
- MeSH D02.092.063.291.375 – ethanolamine
- MeSH D02.092.063.291.410 – 2-hydroxyphenethylamine
- MeSH D02.092.063.291.439 – isoproterenol
- MeSH D02.092.063.291.460 – labetalol
- MeSH D02.092.063.291.480 – midodrine
- MeSH D02.092.063.291.525 – octopamine
- MeSH D02.092.063.291.550 – orciprenaline
- MeSH D02.092.063.291.550.300 – fenoterol
- MeSH D02.092.063.291.617 – phenylephrine
- MeSH D02.092.063.291.617.300 – etilefrine
- MeSH D02.092.063.291.647 – procaterol
- MeSH D02.092.063.291.805 – sotalol
- MeSH D02.092.063.291.870 – synephrine
- MeSH D02.092.063.291.905 – terbutaline
- MeSH D02.092.063.350 – heptaminol
- MeSH D02.092.063.400 – isoetharine
- MeSH D02.092.063.480 – norepinephrine
- MeSH D02.092.063.480.651 – normetanephrine
- MeSH D02.092.063.624 – propanolamines
- MeSH D02.092.063.624.302 – ephedrine
- MeSH D02.092.063.624.380 – histidinol
- MeSH D02.092.063.624.536 – methoxamine
- MeSH D02.092.063.624.698 – phenoxypropanolamines
- MeSH D02.092.063.624.698.025 – acebutolol
- MeSH D02.092.063.624.698.055 – alprenolol
- MeSH D02.092.063.624.698.055.200 – dihydroalprenolol
- MeSH D02.092.063.624.698.070 – atenolol
- MeSH D02.092.063.624.698.077 – betaxolol
- MeSH D02.092.063.624.698.085 – bisoprolol
- MeSH D02.092.063.624.698.146 – bupranolol
- MeSH D02.092.063.624.698.207 – carteolol
- MeSH D02.092.063.624.698.268 – celiprolol
- MeSH D02.092.063.624.698.512 – levobunolol
- MeSH D02.092.063.624.698.542 – metipranolol
- MeSH D02.092.063.624.698.573 – metoprolol
- MeSH D02.092.063.624.698.601 – nadolol
- MeSH D02.092.063.624.698.633 – oxprenolol
- MeSH D02.092.063.624.698.688 – penbutolol
- MeSH D02.092.063.624.698.699 – pindolol
- MeSH D02.092.063.624.698.699.420 – iodocyanopindolol
- MeSH D02.092.063.624.698.705 – practolol
- MeSH D02.092.063.624.698.708 – prenalterol
- MeSH D02.092.063.624.698.711 – propranolol
- MeSH D02.092.063.624.698.855 – xamoterol
- MeSH D02.092.063.624.706 – phenylpropanolamine
- MeSH D02.092.063.624.706.400 – p-hydroxynorephedrine
- MeSH D02.092.063.624.706.500 – metaraminol
- MeSH D02.092.063.624.706.550 – nylidrin
- MeSH D02.092.063.624.706.600 – oxyfedrine
- MeSH D02.092.063.624.870 – ritodrine
- MeSH D02.092.063.624.890 – suloctidil
- MeSH D02.092.063.624.915 – timolol
- MeSH D02.092.063.700 – sphingosine
- MeSH D02.092.063.700.700 – psychosine

==== MeSH D02.092.080 – aminopyridines ====
- MeSH D02.092.080.060 – 4-aminopyridine
- MeSH D02.092.080.085 – amrinone
- MeSH D02.092.080.085.543 – milrinone

==== MeSH D02.092.146 – aniline compounds ====
- MeSH D02.092.146.100 – aminophenols
- MeSH D02.092.146.100.700 – phenetidine
- MeSH D02.092.146.125 – anilino naphthalenesulfonates
- MeSH D02.092.146.215 – Auramine O
- MeSH D02.092.146.271 – bromhexine
- MeSH D02.092.146.271.100 – ambroxol
- MeSH D02.092.146.290 – BW284C51
- MeSH D02.092.146.325 – p-dimethylaminoazobenzene
- MeSH D02.092.146.325.500 – methyldimethylaminoazobenzene
- MeSH D02.092.146.350 – diphenylamine
- MeSH D02.092.146.400 – gentian violet
- MeSH D02.092.146.475 – methyl green
- MeSH D02.092.146.500 – MBOCA
- MeSH D02.092.146.651 – phenylenediamines
- MeSH D02.092.146.651.900 – tetramethylphenylenediamine
- MeSH D02.092.146.755 – rosaniline dyes
- MeSH D02.092.146.859 – toluidines
- MeSH D02.092.146.859.717 – trifluralin

==== MeSH D02.092.200 – benzylamines ====
- MeSH D02.092.200.650 – pargyline

==== MeSH D02.092.211 – biogenic amines ====
- MeSH D02.092.211.111 – acetylcholine
- MeSH D02.092.211.215 – biogenic monoamines
- MeSH D02.092.211.215.311 – catecholamines
- MeSH D02.092.211.215.311.342 – dopamine
- MeSH D02.092.211.215.311.461 – epinephrine
- MeSH D02.092.211.215.311.461.400 – metanephrine
- MeSH D02.092.211.215.311.560 – norepinephrine
- MeSH D02.092.211.215.311.560.220 – droxidopa
- MeSH D02.092.211.215.311.560.651 – normetanephrine
- MeSH D02.092.211.215.311.600 – orciprenaline
- MeSH D02.092.211.215.311.600.300 – fenoterol
- MeSH D02.092.211.215.501 – histamine
- MeSH D02.092.211.215.501.621 – methylhistamines
- MeSH D02.092.211.215.581 – 2-hydroxyphenethylamine
- MeSH D02.092.211.215.801 – tryptamines
- MeSH D02.092.211.215.801.451 – N,N-dimethyltryptamine
- MeSH D02.092.211.215.801.451.601 – methoxydimethyltryptamines
- MeSH D02.092.211.215.801.852 – serotonin
- MeSH D02.092.211.215.801.852.611 – 5-methoxytryptamine
- MeSH D02.092.211.215.811 – tyramine
- MeSH D02.092.211.215.811.651 – octopamine
- MeSH D02.092.211.215.811.875 – synephrine
- MeSH D02.092.211.415 – biogenic polyamines
- MeSH D02.092.211.415.261 – cadaverine
- MeSH D02.092.211.415.701 – putrescine
- MeSH D02.092.211.415.701.801 – spermidine
- MeSH D02.092.211.415.701.801.821 – spermine

==== MeSH D02.092.311 – catecholamines ====
- MeSH D02.092.311.200 – dihydroxyphenylalanine
- MeSH D02.092.311.200.180 – cysteinyldopa
- MeSH D02.092.311.200.480 – levodopa
- MeSH D02.092.311.200.538 – methyldopa
- MeSH D02.092.311.200.538.200 – carbidopa
- MeSH D02.092.311.220 – dobutamine
- MeSH D02.092.311.342 – dopamine
- MeSH D02.092.311.342.300 – deoxyepinephrine
- MeSH D02.092.311.342.478 – hydroxydopamines
- MeSH D02.092.311.342.478.650 – oxidopamine
- MeSH D02.092.311.461 – epinephrine
- MeSH D02.092.311.461.200 – deoxyepinephrine
- MeSH D02.092.311.461.400 – metanephrine
- MeSH D02.092.311.461.484 – norepinephrine
- MeSH D02.092.311.461.484.220 – droxidopa
- MeSH D02.092.311.461.484.400 – nordefrin
- MeSH D02.092.311.461.651 – normetanephrine
- MeSH D02.092.311.649 – isoproterenol
- MeSH D02.092.311.660 – orciprenaline
- MeSH D02.092.311.660.300 – fenoterol

==== MeSH D02.092.384 – cyclohexylamines ====
- MeSH D02.092.384.175 – bromhexine
- MeSH D02.092.384.175.100 – ambroxol

==== MeSH D02.092.471 – ethylamines ====
- MeSH D02.092.471.200 – cystamine
- MeSH D02.092.471.245 – dibenzylchlorethamine
- MeSH D02.092.471.302 – diethylamines
- MeSH D02.092.471.308 – diethylpropion
- MeSH D02.092.471.320 – diphenhydramine
- MeSH D02.092.471.320.250 – dimenhydrinate
- MeSH D02.092.471.440 – histamine
- MeSH D02.092.471.440.500 – methylhistamines
- MeSH D02.092.471.562 – mercaptoethylamines
- MeSH D02.092.471.562.369 – cysteamine
- MeSH D02.092.471.600 – orphenadrine
- MeSH D02.092.471.683 – phenethylamines
- MeSH D02.092.471.683.061 – albuterol
- MeSH D02.092.471.683.152 – amphetamines
- MeSH D02.092.471.683.152.110 – amphetamine
- MeSH D02.092.471.683.152.110.200 – dextroamphetamine
- MeSH D02.092.471.683.152.200 – p-chloroamphetamine
- MeSH D02.092.471.683.152.391 – 2,5-dimethoxy-4-methylamphetamine
- MeSH D02.092.471.683.152.500 – p-hydroxyamphetamine
- MeSH D02.092.471.683.152.535 – iofetamine
- MeSH D02.092.471.683.152.619 – methamphetamine
- MeSH D02.092.471.683.152.619.307 – benzphetamine
- MeSH D02.092.471.683.152.660 – 3,4-methylenedioxyamphetamine
- MeSH D02.092.471.683.152.670 – n-methyl-3,4-methylenedioxyamphetamine
- MeSH D02.092.471.683.152.766 – phentermine
- MeSH D02.092.471.683.152.766.262 – chlorphentermine
- MeSH D02.092.471.683.152.766.617 – mephentermine
- MeSH D02.092.471.683.221 – butoxamine
- MeSH D02.092.471.683.338 – dexfenfluramine
- MeSH D02.092.471.683.386 – dimethoxyphenylethylamine
- MeSH D02.092.471.683.410 – dobutamine
- MeSH D02.092.471.683.450 – fendiline
- MeSH D02.092.471.683.467 – fenfluramine
- MeSH D02.092.471.683.467.500 – norfenfluramine
- MeSH D02.092.471.683.530 – hexoprenaline
- MeSH D02.092.471.683.545 – 2-hydroxyphenethylamine
- MeSH D02.092.471.683.560 – isoxsuprine
- MeSH D02.092.471.683.635 – mescaline
- MeSH D02.092.471.683.661 – methoxamine
- MeSH D02.092.471.683.670 – p-methoxy-n-methylphenethylamine
- MeSH D02.092.471.683.715 – nylidrin
- MeSH D02.092.471.683.725 – octopamine
- MeSH D02.092.471.683.775 – oxyfedrine
- MeSH D02.092.471.683.825 – prenylamine
- MeSH D02.092.471.683.870 – ritodrine
- MeSH D02.092.471.683.915 – selegiline
- MeSH D02.092.471.683.934 – suloctidil
- MeSH D02.092.471.683.953 – verapamil
- MeSH D02.092.471.683.953.395 – gallopamil
- MeSH D02.092.471.739 – phenoxybenzamine

==== MeSH D02.092.570 – hydroxylamines ====
- MeSH D02.092.570.050 – aminooxyacetic acid
- MeSH D02.092.570.394 – hydroxamic acids
- MeSH D02.092.570.394.150 – bufexamac
- MeSH D02.092.570.394.265 – deferoxamine
- MeSH D02.092.570.394.380 – ferrichrome
- MeSH D02.092.570.450 – 4-hydroxyaminoquinoline-1-oxide
- MeSH D02.092.570.665 – oximes
- MeSH D02.092.570.665.250 – fluvoxamine
- MeSH D02.092.570.665.500 – obidoxime chloride
- MeSH D02.092.570.665.535 – pralidoxime compounds
- MeSH D02.092.570.665.810 – technetium tc 99m exametazime
- MeSH D02.092.570.665.850 – trimedoxime

==== MeSH D02.092.668 – methylamines ====
- MeSH D02.092.668.387 – dimethylamines
- MeSH D02.092.668.387.500 – moxisylyte

==== MeSH D02.092.705 – 1-naphthylamine ====
- MeSH D02.092.705.800 – sertraline

==== MeSH D02.092.782 – polyamines ====
- MeSH D02.092.782.200 – colestipol
- MeSH D02.092.782.258 – diamines
- MeSH D02.092.782.258.174 – cadaverine
- MeSH D02.092.782.258.368 – ethylenediamines
- MeSH D02.092.782.258.368.050 – aminophylline
- MeSH D02.092.782.258.368.250 – edetic acid
- MeSH D02.092.782.258.368.257 – egtazic acid
- MeSH D02.092.782.258.368.265 – ethambutol
- MeSH D02.092.782.258.368.500 – methapyrilene
- MeSH D02.092.782.258.368.880 – triethylenetetramine
- MeSH D02.092.782.258.368.900 – tripelennamine
- MeSH D02.092.782.258.651 – phenylenediamines
- MeSH D02.092.782.258.651.900 – tetramethylphenylenediamine
- MeSH D02.092.782.258.784 – putrescine
- MeSH D02.092.782.420 – hexadimethrine
- MeSH D02.092.782.500 – methenamine
- MeSH D02.092.782.590 – pentetic acid
- MeSH D02.092.782.590.401 – gadolinium dtpa
- MeSH D02.092.782.590.883 – technetium tc 99m pentetate
- MeSH D02.092.782.677 – spermidine
- MeSH D02.092.782.802 – spermine

==== MeSH D02.092.831 – propylamines ====
- MeSH D02.092.831.170 – citalopram
- MeSH D02.092.831.180 – clorgyline
- MeSH D02.092.831.280 – fluoxetine
- MeSH D02.092.831.500 – mexiletine
- MeSH D02.092.831.690 – promethazine
- MeSH D02.092.831.845 – tranylcypromine

==== MeSH D02.092.877 – quaternary ammonium compounds ====
- MeSH D02.092.877.096 – benzylammonium compounds
- MeSH D02.092.877.096.019 – ambenonium chloride
- MeSH D02.092.877.096.040 – benzalkonium compounds
- MeSH D02.092.877.096.082 – benzethonium
- MeSH D02.092.877.096.166 – bephenium compounds
- MeSH D02.092.877.096.333 – bretylium compounds
- MeSH D02.092.877.096.333.150 – bretylium tosylate
- MeSH D02.092.877.233 – betalains
- MeSH D02.092.877.233.500 – betacyanins
- MeSH D02.092.877.233.555 – betaxanthins
- MeSH D02.092.877.250 – bis-trimethylammonium compounds
- MeSH D02.092.877.250.372 – decamethonium compounds
- MeSH D02.092.877.250.592 – hexamethonium compounds
- MeSH D02.092.877.250.592.400 – hexamethonium
- MeSH D02.092.877.370 – emepronium
- MeSH D02.092.877.400 – gallamine triethiodide
- MeSH D02.092.877.425 – glycopyrrolate
- MeSH D02.092.877.435 – hemicholinium 3
- MeSH D02.092.877.475 – lissamine green dyes
- MeSH D02.092.877.648 – oxyphenonium
- MeSH D02.092.877.674 – phenylammonium compounds
- MeSH D02.092.877.674.033 – (4-(m-chlorophenylcarbamoyloxy)-2-butynyl)trimethylammonium chloride
- MeSH D02.092.877.674.333 – edrophonium
- MeSH D02.092.877.674.666 – neostigmine
- MeSH D02.092.877.700 – propantheline
- MeSH D02.092.877.787 – tetraethylammonium compounds
- MeSH D02.092.877.787.500 – tetraethylammonium
- MeSH D02.092.877.844 – toxiferine
- MeSH D02.092.877.844.050 – alcuronium
- MeSH D02.092.877.883 – trimethyl ammonium compounds
- MeSH D02.092.877.883.077 – betaine
- MeSH D02.092.877.883.088 – bethanechol compounds
- MeSH D02.092.877.883.088.100 – bethanechol
- MeSH D02.092.877.883.099 – carnitine
- MeSH D02.092.877.883.099.090 – acetylcarnitine
- MeSH D02.092.877.883.099.700 – palmitoylcarnitine
- MeSH D02.092.877.883.111 – cetrimonium compounds
- MeSH D02.092.877.883.222 – chlorisondamine
- MeSH D02.092.877.883.277 – chlormequat
- MeSH D02.092.877.883.333 – choline
- MeSH D02.092.877.883.333.100 – benzoylcholine
- MeSH D02.092.877.883.333.115 – carbachol
- MeSH D02.092.877.883.333.130 – cytidine diphosphate choline
- MeSH D02.092.877.883.333.700 – phosphorylcholine
- MeSH D02.092.877.883.333.710 – platelet activating factor
- MeSH D02.092.877.883.333.720 – propylbenzilylcholine mustard
- MeSH D02.092.877.883.333.780 – succinylcholine
- MeSH D02.092.877.883.333.800 – thiocholine
- MeSH D02.092.877.883.333.800.030 – acetylthiocholine
- MeSH D02.092.877.883.333.800.200 – butyrylthiocholine
- MeSH D02.092.877.883.555 – methacholine compounds
- MeSH D02.092.877.883.555.500 – methacholine chloride
- MeSH D02.092.877.883.777 – muscarine
- MeSH D02.092.877.922 – tubocurarine

=== MeSH D02.172 – azo compounds ===
==== MeSH D02.172.080 – azoxymethane ====
- MeSH D02.172.080.200 – cycasin
- MeSH D02.172.080.600 – methylazoxymethanol acetate

==== MeSH D02.172.383 – diazonium compounds ====
- MeSH D02.172.383.383 – diazomethane

=== MeSH D02.203 – boron compounds ===
==== MeSH D02.203.087 – boranes ====
- MeSH D02.203.087.050 – borohydrides
- MeSH D02.203.087.050.750 – tetraphenylborate

==== MeSH D02.203.130 – boric acids ====
- MeSH D02.203.130.075 – borates

=== MeSH D02.241 – carboxylic acids ===
==== MeSH D02.241.081 – acids, acyclic ====
===== MeSH D02.241.081.038 – acetic acids =====
- MeSH D02.241.081.038.108 – acetamides
- MeSH D02.241.081.038.108.080 – 2-acetylaminofluorene
- MeSH D02.241.081.038.108.080.070 – acetoxyacetylaminofluorene
- MeSH D02.241.081.038.108.080.400 – hydroxyacetylaminofluorene
- MeSH D02.241.081.038.108.189 – allylisopropylacetamide
- MeSH D02.241.081.038.108.400 – iodoacetamide
- MeSH D02.241.081.038.108.650 – piracetam
- MeSH D02.241.081.038.108.786 – thioacetamide
- MeSH D02.241.081.038.208 – acetic acid
- MeSH D02.241.081.038.208.025 – acetates
- MeSH D02.241.081.038.208.025.221 – dichloroacetate
- MeSH D02.241.081.038.208.025.285 – fluoroacetates
- MeSH D02.241.081.038.208.025.487 – iodoacetates
- MeSH D02.241.081.038.208.025.690 – potassium acetate
- MeSH D02.241.081.038.208.025.800 – sodium acetate
- MeSH D02.241.081.038.208.025.900 – thioglycolates
- MeSH D02.241.081.038.208.025.966 – zinc acetate
- MeSH D02.241.081.038.270 – acetic anhydrides
- MeSH D02.241.081.038.350 – aminooxyacetic acid
- MeSH D02.241.081.038.440 – edetic acid
- MeSH D02.241.081.038.455 – egtazic acid
- MeSH D02.241.081.038.581 – iodoacetic acid
- MeSH D02.241.081.038.581.400 – iodoacetamide
- MeSH D02.241.081.038.581.431 – iodoacetates
- MeSH D02.241.081.038.600 – nitrilotriacetic acid
- MeSH D02.241.081.038.694 – pentetic acid
- MeSH D02.241.081.038.694.400 – gadolinium dtpa
- MeSH D02.241.081.038.694.883 – technetium tc 99m pentetate
- MeSH D02.241.081.038.700 – peracetic acid
- MeSH D02.241.081.038.725 – phosphonoacetic acid
- MeSH D02.241.081.038.725.250 – foscarnet
- MeSH D02.241.081.038.866 – trichloroacetic acid
- MeSH D02.241.081.038.933 – trifluoroacetic acid

===== MeSH D02.241.081.069 – acrylates =====
- MeSH D02.241.081.069.094 – acrylamides
- MeSH D02.241.081.069.094.015 – acrylamide
- MeSH D02.241.081.069.366 – cyanoacrylates
- MeSH D02.241.081.069.366.200 – bucrylate
- MeSH D02.241.081.069.366.350 – enbucrilate
- MeSH D02.241.081.069.600 – methacrylates
- MeSH D02.241.081.069.600.150 – bisphenol a-glycidyl methacrylate
- MeSH D02.241.081.069.800 – polymethacrylic acids
- MeSH D02.241.081.069.800.550 – methyl methacrylates
- MeSH D02.241.081.069.800.550.450 – methyl methacrylate
- MeSH D02.241.081.069.800.550.500 – polymethyl methacrylate
- MeSH D02.241.081.069.800.700 – polyhydroxyethyl methacrylate
- MeSH D02.241.081.069.920 – urocanic acid

===== MeSH D02.241.081.160 – butyric acids =====
- MeSH D02.241.081.160.050 – aminobutyric acids
- MeSH D02.241.081.160.050.055 – aminoisobutyric acids
- MeSH D02.241.081.160.050.350 – gamma-aminobutyric acid
- MeSH D02.241.081.160.050.350.100 – baclofen
- MeSH D02.241.081.160.050.350.900 – vigabatrin
- MeSH D02.241.081.160.140 – butyric acid
- MeSH D02.241.081.160.140.135 – butyrates
- MeSH D02.241.081.160.140.135.100 – bezafibrate
- MeSH D02.241.081.160.140.135.175 – clofenapate
- MeSH D02.241.081.160.140.135.193 – clofibrate
- MeSH D02.241.081.160.225 – clofibric acid
- MeSH D02.241.081.160.225.133 – bezafibrate
- MeSH D02.241.081.160.225.187 – clofenapate
- MeSH D02.241.081.160.225.195 – clofibrate
- MeSH D02.241.081.160.225.396 – gemfibrozil
- MeSH D02.241.081.160.225.597 – procetofen
- MeSH D02.241.081.160.240 – crotonic acids
- MeSH D02.241.081.160.240.240 – crotonates
- MeSH D02.241.081.160.400 – 3-hydroxybutyric acid
- MeSH D02.241.081.160.400.410 – hydroxybutyrates
- MeSH D02.241.081.160.400.410.700 – sodium oxybate

===== MeSH D02.241.081.193 – caproates =====
- MeSH D02.241.081.193.150 – aminocaproic acids
- MeSH D02.241.081.193.150.075 – 6-aminocaproic acid
- MeSH D02.241.081.193.467 – hexanoic acids
- MeSH D02.241.081.193.467.700 – penicillic acid
- MeSH D02.241.081.193.678 – mycophenolic acid

===== MeSH D02.241.081.222 – caprylates =====
- MeSH D02.241.081.222.572 – octanoic acids

===== MeSH D02.241.081.251 – carbamates =====
- MeSH D02.241.081.251.022 – albendazole
- MeSH D02.241.081.251.046 – aldicarb
- MeSH D02.241.081.251.125 – benomyl
- MeSH D02.241.081.251.140 – carbadox
- MeSH D02.241.081.251.145 – carbamyl phosphate
- MeSH D02.241.081.251.150 – carbaryl
- MeSH D02.241.081.251.165 – carisoprodol
- MeSH D02.241.081.251.240 – diethylcarbamazine
- MeSH D02.241.081.251.320 – fenbendazole
- MeSH D02.241.081.251.415 – mebendazole
- MeSH D02.241.081.251.510 – meprobamate
- MeSH D02.241.081.251.515 – methocarbamol
- MeSH D02.241.081.251.525 – methomyl
- MeSH D02.241.081.251.583 – phenylcarbamates
- MeSH D02.241.081.251.583.166 – carbofuran
- MeSH D02.241.081.251.583.177 – chlorpropham
- MeSH D02.241.081.251.583.555 – methiocarb
- MeSH D02.241.081.251.583.577 – methocarbamol
- MeSH D02.241.081.251.583.682 – physostigmine
- MeSH D02.241.081.251.583.788 – propoxur
- MeSH D02.241.081.251.583.799 – pyridinolcarbamate
- MeSH D02.241.081.251.869 – thiocarbamates
- MeSH D02.241.081.251.869.210 – dimethyldithiocarbamate
- MeSH D02.241.081.251.869.210.800 – thiram
- MeSH D02.241.081.251.869.210.925 – ziram
- MeSH D02.241.081.251.869.220 – ditiocarb
- MeSH D02.241.081.251.869.220.250 – disulfiram
- MeSH D02.241.081.251.869.265 – ethylenebis(dithiocarbamates)
- MeSH D02.241.081.251.869.265.441 – maneb
- MeSH D02.241.081.251.869.265.908 – zineb
- MeSH D02.241.081.251.869.791 – tolnaftate
- MeSH D02.241.081.251.869.820 – triallate
- MeSH D02.241.081.251.890 – thiophanate
- MeSH D02.241.081.251.944 – urethane
- MeSH D02.241.081.251.944.500 – nitrosomethylurethane
- MeSH D02.241.081.251.944.750 – polyurethanes

===== MeSH D02.241.081.337 – dicarboxylic acids =====
- MeSH D02.241.081.337.052 – adipic acids
- MeSH D02.241.081.337.052.075 – 2-aminoadipic acid
- MeSH D02.241.081.337.052.250 – dimethyl adipimidate
- MeSH D02.241.081.337.075 – bongkrekic acid
- MeSH D02.241.081.337.302 – fumarates
- MeSH D02.241.081.337.351 – glutarates
- MeSH D02.241.081.337.351.300 – formiminoglutamic acid
- MeSH D02.241.081.337.351.502 – ketoglutaric acids
- MeSH D02.241.081.337.351.550 – meglutol
- MeSH D02.241.081.337.463 – malates
- MeSH D02.241.081.337.463.703 – thiomalates
- MeSH D02.241.081.337.463.703.451 – gold sodium thiomalate
- MeSH D02.241.081.337.502 – maleates
- MeSH D02.241.081.337.502.524 – maleimides
- MeSH D02.241.081.337.502.524.418 – ethylmaleimide
- MeSH D02.241.081.337.540 – malonates
- MeSH D02.241.081.337.540.500 – methylmalonic acid
- MeSH D02.241.081.337.540.700 – phenylethylmalonamide
- MeSH D02.241.081.337.646 – oxalic acids
- MeSH D02.241.081.337.646.750 – oxalic acid
- MeSH D02.241.081.337.646.750.700 – oxalates
- MeSH D02.241.081.337.646.750.700.265 – calcium oxalate
- MeSH D02.241.081.337.646.765 – oxaloacetic acids
- MeSH D02.241.081.337.646.765.765 – oxaloacetates
- MeSH D02.241.081.337.646.765.765.760 – oxaloacetate
- MeSH D02.241.081.337.699 – pimelic acids
- MeSH D02.241.081.337.699.250 – diaminopimelic acid
- MeSH D02.241.081.337.820 – succinic acids
- MeSH D02.241.081.337.820.150 – argininosuccinic acid
- MeSH D02.241.081.337.820.375 – dioctyl sulfosuccinic acid
- MeSH D02.241.081.337.820.525 – succimer
- MeSH D02.241.081.337.820.525.725 – technetium tc 99m dimercaptosuccinic acid
- MeSH D02.241.081.337.820.600 – succinic acid
- MeSH D02.241.081.337.820.600.700 – succinates
- MeSH D02.241.081.337.820.600.700.600 – succinic anhydrides
- MeSH D02.241.081.337.820.600.700.700 – succinylcholine
- MeSH D02.241.081.337.864 – tartrates
- MeSH D02.241.081.337.902 – tartronates

===== MeSH D02.241.081.504 – formic acids =====
- MeSH D02.241.081.504.310 – formamides
- MeSH D02.241.081.504.310.387 – dimethylformamide
- MeSH D02.241.081.504.435 – formates
- MeSH D02.241.081.504.560 – formic acid esters
- MeSH D02.241.081.504.560.250 – diethyl pyrocarbonate

===== MeSH D02.241.081.583 – imino acids =====
- MeSH D02.241.081.583.100 – azetidinecarboxylic acid
- MeSH D02.241.081.583.400 – technetium tc 99m diethyl-iminodiacetic acid
- MeSH D02.241.081.583.450 – technetium tc 99m disofenin
- MeSH D02.241.081.583.900 – technetium tc 99m lidofenin

===== MeSH D02.241.081.751 – propionates =====
- MeSH D02.241.081.751.650 – procetofen
- MeSH D02.241.081.751.700 – propionic acids
- MeSH D02.241.081.751.700.350 – flurbiprofen
- MeSH D02.241.081.751.700.550 – 3-mercaptopropionic acid
- MeSH D02.241.081.751.700.600 – nafenopin
- MeSH D02.241.081.751.725 – propoxyphene

===== MeSH D02.241.081.844 – sugar acids =====
- MeSH D02.241.081.844.107 – ascorbic acid
- MeSH D02.241.081.844.107.260 – dehydroascorbic acid
- MeSH D02.241.081.844.200 – 2,3-diketogulonic acid
- MeSH D02.241.081.844.300 – glucaric acid
- MeSH D02.241.081.844.322 – gluconates
- MeSH D02.241.081.844.322.060 – antimony sodium gluconate
- MeSH D02.241.081.844.322.200 – calcium gluconate
- MeSH D02.241.081.844.387 – glyceric acids
- MeSH D02.241.081.844.387.388 – diphosphoglyceric acids
- MeSH D02.241.081.844.387.388.175 – 2,3-diphosphoglycerate
- MeSH D02.241.081.844.520 – muramic acids
- MeSH D02.241.081.844.562 – neuraminic acids
- MeSH D02.241.081.844.562.668 – sialic acids
- MeSH D02.241.081.844.562.668.250 – cytidine monophosphate n-acetylneuraminic acid
- MeSH D02.241.081.844.562.668.550 – n-acetylneuraminic acid
- MeSH D02.241.081.844.759 – tartrates
- MeSH D02.241.081.844.821 – tartronates
- MeSH D02.241.081.844.915 – uronic acids
- MeSH D02.241.081.844.915.325 – glucuronic acids
- MeSH D02.241.081.844.915.325.300 – glucuronic acid
- MeSH D02.241.081.844.915.325.300.400 – glucuronates
- MeSH D02.241.081.844.915.325.300.400.448 – glucuronides
- MeSH D02.241.081.844.915.400 – hexuronic acids
- MeSH D02.241.081.844.915.400.500 – iduronic acid

===== MeSH D02.241.081.901 – tricarboxylic acids =====
- MeSH D02.241.081.901.177 – aconitic acid
- MeSH D02.241.081.901.400 – 1-carboxyglutamic acid
- MeSH D02.241.081.901.434 – citrates
- MeSH D02.241.081.901.434.220 – calcium citrate
- MeSH D02.241.081.901.434.249 – citric acid
- MeSH D02.241.081.901.434.498 – isocitrates
- MeSH D02.241.081.901.434.749 – potassium citrate

===== MeSH D02.241.081.944 – valerates =====
- MeSH D02.241.081.944.509 – pentanoic acids
- MeSH D02.241.081.944.509.350 – gemfibrozil
- MeSH D02.241.081.944.509.900 – valproic acid
- MeSH D02.241.081.944.550 – proadifen

==== MeSH D02.241.152 – acids, aldehydic ====
- MeSH D02.241.152.367 – glyoxylates
- MeSH D02.241.152.367.600 – oxamic acid
- MeSH D02.241.152.811 – uronic acids
- MeSH D02.241.152.811.325 – glucuronic acids
- MeSH D02.241.152.811.325.300 – glucuronic acid
- MeSH D02.241.152.811.325.300.400 – glucuronates
- MeSH D02.241.152.811.325.300.400.448 – glucuronides
- MeSH D02.241.152.811.400 – hexuronic acids
- MeSH D02.241.152.811.400.500 – iduronic acid

==== MeSH D02.241.223 – acids, carbocyclic ====
===== MeSH D02.241.223.100 – benzoic acids =====
- MeSH D02.241.223.100.054 – aminobenzoic acids
- MeSH D02.241.223.100.054.055 – 4-aminobenzoic acid
- MeSH D02.241.223.100.054.055.015 – acecainide
- MeSH D02.241.223.100.054.055.105 – benzocaine
- MeSH D02.241.223.100.054.055.650 – procainamide
- MeSH D02.241.223.100.054.055.665 – procaine
- MeSH D02.241.223.100.054.055.665.666 – penicillin g procaine
- MeSH D02.241.223.100.054.055.680 – propoxycaine
- MeSH D02.241.223.100.054.055.840 – tetracaine
- MeSH D02.241.223.100.054.065 – anthranilic acids
- MeSH D02.241.223.100.054.065.385 – flufenamic acid
- MeSH D02.241.223.100.054.065.440 – glafenine
- MeSH D02.241.223.100.054.065.470 – 3-hydroxyanthranilic acid
- MeSH D02.241.223.100.054.065.515 – meclofenamic acid
- MeSH D02.241.223.100.054.065.520 – mefenamic acid
- MeSH D02.241.223.100.054.085 – ethopabate
- MeSH D02.241.223.100.120 – benzamides
- MeSH D02.241.223.100.120.067 – aminohippuric acids
- MeSH D02.241.223.100.120.067.100 – p-aminohippuric acid
- MeSH D02.241.223.100.120.135 – cisapride
- MeSH D02.241.223.100.120.230 – deet
- MeSH D02.241.223.100.120.240 – dinitolmide
- MeSH D02.241.223.100.120.460 – hippurates
- MeSH D02.241.223.100.120.470 – indoramin
- MeSH D02.241.223.100.120.475 – iodohippuric acid
- MeSH D02.241.223.100.120.510 – metoclopramide
- MeSH D02.241.223.100.120.600 – moclobemide
- MeSH D02.241.223.100.120.650 – procainamide
- MeSH D02.241.223.100.120.655 – procarbazine
- MeSH D02.241.223.100.120.761 – raclopride
- MeSH D02.241.223.100.120.796 – remoxipride
- MeSH D02.241.223.100.120.866 – sulpiride
- MeSH D02.241.223.100.120.900 – tiapride
- MeSH D02.241.223.100.140 – benzoic acid
- MeSH D02.241.223.100.140.100 – benzoates
- MeSH D02.241.223.100.140.100.150 – bromobenzoates
- MeSH D02.241.223.100.140.100.250 – chlorobenzoates
- MeSH D02.241.223.100.140.100.375 – iodobenzoates
- MeSH D02.241.223.100.140.100.375.880 – triiodobenzoic acids
- MeSH D02.241.223.100.140.100.375.880.020 – acetrizoic acid
- MeSH D02.241.223.100.140.100.375.880.270 – diatrizoate
- MeSH D02.241.223.100.140.100.375.880.275 – diatrizoate meglumine
- MeSH D02.241.223.100.140.100.375.880.375 – iodamide
- MeSH D02.241.223.100.140.100.375.880.380 – iodipamide
- MeSH D02.241.223.100.140.100.375.880.390 – ioglycamic acid
- MeSH D02.241.223.100.140.100.375.880.400 – iohexol
- MeSH D02.241.223.100.140.100.375.880.410 – iopamidol
- MeSH D02.241.223.100.140.100.375.880.420 – iothalamate meglumine
- MeSH D02.241.223.100.140.100.375.880.430 – iothalamic acid
- MeSH D02.241.223.100.140.100.375.880.450 – ioxaglic acid
- MeSH D02.241.223.100.140.100.375.880.530 – metrizoate
- MeSH D02.241.223.100.140.100.375.880.545 – metrizamide
- MeSH D02.241.223.100.140.100.500 – mercuribenzoates
- MeSH D02.241.223.100.140.100.500.261 – chloromercuribenzoates
- MeSH D02.241.223.100.140.100.500.261.275 – p-chloromercuribenzoic acid
- MeSH D02.241.223.100.140.100.500.450 – hydroxymercuribenzoates
- MeSH D02.241.223.100.140.100.650 – nitrobenzoates
- MeSH D02.241.223.100.140.100.650.300 – dithionitrobenzoic acid
- MeSH D02.241.223.100.140.100.825 – sodium benzoate
- MeSH D02.241.223.100.150 – benzoyl peroxide
- MeSH D02.241.223.100.156 – benzoylcholine
- MeSH D02.241.223.100.215 – bumetanide
- MeSH D02.241.223.100.275 – dicamba
- MeSH D02.241.223.100.360 – hexobendine
- MeSH D02.241.223.100.380 – hydroxybenzoic acids
- MeSH D02.241.223.100.380.350 – gallic acid
- MeSH D02.241.223.100.380.350.299 – hydrolyzable tannins
- MeSH D02.241.223.100.380.350.600 – propyl gallate
- MeSH D02.241.223.100.380.450 – hydroxymercuribenzoates
- MeSH D02.241.223.100.380.620 – pactamycin
- MeSH D02.241.223.100.380.635 – parabens
- MeSH D02.241.223.100.380.800 – salicylic acids
- MeSH D02.241.223.100.380.800.050 – aminosalicylic acids
- MeSH D02.241.223.100.380.800.050.060 – p-aminosalicylic acid
- MeSH D02.241.223.100.380.800.050.540 – mesalamine
- MeSH D02.241.223.100.380.800.062 – anacardic acids
- MeSH D02.241.223.100.380.800.075 – aspirin
- MeSH D02.241.223.100.380.800.300 – diflunisal
- MeSH D02.241.223.100.380.800.801 – salicylic acid
- MeSH D02.241.223.100.380.800.801.810 – salicylates
- MeSH D02.241.223.100.380.800.801.810.405 – gentisates
- MeSH D02.241.223.100.380.800.801.810.811 – sodium salicylate
- MeSH D02.241.223.100.380.900 – vanillic acid
- MeSH D02.241.223.100.900 – trimebutine

===== MeSH D02.241.223.201 – cinnamates =====
- MeSH D02.241.223.201.170 – caffeic acids
- MeSH D02.241.223.201.170.500 – eugenol
- MeSH D02.241.223.201.185 – chlorogenic acid
- MeSH D02.241.223.201.200 – cinanserin
- MeSH D02.241.223.201.210 – coumaric acids
- MeSH D02.241.223.201.711 – puromycin
- MeSH D02.241.223.201.711.650 – puromycin aminonucleoside

===== MeSH D02.241.223.268 – cyclohexanecarboxylic acids =====
- MeSH D02.241.223.268.034 – abscisic acid
- MeSH D02.241.223.268.070 – aurintricarboxylic acid
- MeSH D02.241.223.268.220 – chlorogenic acid
- MeSH D02.241.223.268.250 – chorismic acid
- MeSH D02.241.223.268.300 – dicyclomine
- MeSH D02.241.223.268.637 – quinic acid
- MeSH D02.241.223.268.792 – shikimic acid
- MeSH D02.241.223.268.825 – tilidine
- MeSH D02.241.223.268.860 – tranexamic acid

===== MeSH D02.241.223.475 – mandelic acids =====
- MeSH D02.241.223.475.180 – cyclandelate
- MeSH D02.241.223.475.730 – vanilmandelic acid

===== MeSH D02.241.223.601 – phenylacetates =====
- MeSH D02.241.223.601.200 – cyclopentolate
- MeSH D02.241.223.601.210 – diclofenac
- MeSH D02.241.223.601.220 – 3,4-dihydroxyphenylacetic acid
- MeSH D02.241.223.601.238 – diphenylacetic acids
- MeSH D02.241.223.601.238.306 – benzilates
- MeSH D02.241.223.601.238.306.140 – benactyzine
- MeSH D02.241.223.601.238.306.740 – quinuclidinyl benzilate
- MeSH D02.241.223.601.329 – guanfacine
- MeSH D02.241.223.601.421 – homogentisic acid
- MeSH D02.241.223.601.521 – homovanillic acid
- MeSH D02.241.223.601.600 – methylphenidate
- MeSH D02.241.223.601.774 – propanidid

===== MeSH D02.241.223.701 – phenylpropionates =====
- MeSH D02.241.223.701.350 – fenoprofen
- MeSH D02.241.223.701.430 – ibuprofen
- MeSH D02.241.223.701.450 – indoprofen
- MeSH D02.241.223.701.480 – ketoprofen
- MeSH D02.241.223.701.700 – suprofen

===== MeSH D02.241.223.805 – phthalic acids =====
- MeSH D02.241.223.805.225 – dibutyl phthalate
- MeSH D02.241.223.805.250 – diethylhexyl phthalate
- MeSH D02.241.223.805.780 – o-phthalaldehyde
- MeSH D02.241.223.805.800 – phthalic anhydrides
- MeSH D02.241.223.805.810 – phthalimides
- MeSH D02.241.223.805.810.800 – thalidomide

==== MeSH D02.241.511 – hydroxy acids ====
- MeSH D02.241.511.085 – benzilates
- MeSH D02.241.511.085.140 – benactyzine
- MeSH D02.241.511.085.740 – quinuclidinyl benzilate
- MeSH D02.241.511.316 – glycolates
- MeSH D02.241.511.316.300 – 2,4-dichlorophenoxyacetic acid
- MeSH D02.241.511.316.455 – halofenate
- MeSH D02.241.511.316.495 – meclofenoxate
- MeSH D02.241.511.316.500 – 2-methyl-4-chlorophenoxyacetic acid
- MeSH D02.241.511.316.682 – phenoxyacetates
- MeSH D02.241.511.316.682.300 – ethacrynic acid
- MeSH D02.241.511.316.682.900 – ticrynafen
- MeSH D02.241.511.316.881 – 2,4,5-trichlorophenoxyacetic acid
- MeSH D02.241.511.372 – hydroxamic acids
- MeSH D02.241.511.372.150 – bufexamac
- MeSH D02.241.511.372.265 – deferoxamine
- MeSH D02.241.511.372.380 – ferrichrome
- MeSH D02.241.511.384 – 3-hydroxyanthranilic acid
- MeSH D02.241.511.390 – hydroxybenzoic acids
- MeSH D02.241.511.390.350 – gallic acid
- MeSH D02.241.511.390.350.299 – hydrolyzable tannins
- MeSH D02.241.511.390.350.600 – propyl gallate
- MeSH D02.241.511.390.450 – hydroxymercuribenzoates
- MeSH D02.241.511.390.585 – pactamycin
- MeSH D02.241.511.390.600 – parabens
- MeSH D02.241.511.390.700 – salicylic acids
- MeSH D02.241.511.390.700.050 – aminosalicylic acids
- MeSH D02.241.511.390.700.050.060 – p-aminosalicylic acid
- MeSH D02.241.511.390.700.050.500 – mesalamine
- MeSH D02.241.511.390.700.062 – anacardic acids
- MeSH D02.241.511.390.700.075 – aspirin
- MeSH D02.241.511.390.700.300 – diflunisal
- MeSH D02.241.511.390.700.800 – salicylic acid
- MeSH D02.241.511.390.700.800.810 – salicylates
- MeSH D02.241.511.390.700.800.810.405 – gentisates
- MeSH D02.241.511.390.700.800.810.810 – sodium salicylate
- MeSH D02.241.511.390.850 – vanillic acid
- MeSH D02.241.511.400 – 3-hydroxybutyric acid
- MeSH D02.241.511.400.410 – hydroxybutyrates
- MeSH D02.241.511.400.410.700 – sodium oxybate
- MeSH D02.241.511.459 – lactates
- MeSH D02.241.511.459.450 – lactic acid
- MeSH D02.241.511.459.800 – sodium lactate
- MeSH D02.241.511.505 – malates
- MeSH D02.241.511.536 – mandelic acids
- MeSH D02.241.511.536.180 – cyclandelate
- MeSH D02.241.511.536.730 – vanilmandelic acid
- MeSH D02.241.511.579 – mevalonic acid
- MeSH D02.241.511.621 – mycolic acids
- MeSH D02.241.511.701 – phosphoenolpyruvate
- MeSH D02.241.511.764 – quinic acid
- MeSH D02.241.511.852 – shikimic acid
- MeSH D02.241.511.902 – sugar acids
- MeSH D02.241.511.902.107 – ascorbic acid
- MeSH D02.241.511.902.107.260 – dehydroascorbic acid
- MeSH D02.241.511.902.200 – 2,3-diketogulonic acid
- MeSH D02.241.511.902.300 – glucaric acid
- MeSH D02.241.511.902.322 – gluconates
- MeSH D02.241.511.902.322.060 – antimony sodium gluconate
- MeSH D02.241.511.902.322.200 – calcium gluconate
- MeSH D02.241.511.902.387 – glyceric acids
- MeSH D02.241.511.902.387.388 – diphosphoglyceric acids
- MeSH D02.241.511.902.387.388.175 – 2,3-diphosphoglycerate
- MeSH D02.241.511.902.522 – muramic acids
- MeSH D02.241.511.902.562 – neuraminic acids
- MeSH D02.241.511.902.562.668 – sialic acids
- MeSH D02.241.511.902.562.668.250 – cytidine monophosphate n-acetylneuraminic acid
- MeSH D02.241.511.902.562.668.550 – n-acetylneuraminic acid
- MeSH D02.241.511.902.759 – tartrates
- MeSH D02.241.511.902.821 – tartronates
- MeSH D02.241.511.902.915 – uronic acids
- MeSH D02.241.511.902.915.325 – glucuronic acids
- MeSH D02.241.511.902.915.325.300 – glucuronic acid
- MeSH D02.241.511.902.915.325.300.400 – glucuronates
- MeSH D02.241.511.902.915.325.300.400.448 – glucuronides
- MeSH D02.241.511.902.915.400 – hexuronic acids
- MeSH D02.241.511.902.915.400.500 – iduronic acid

==== MeSH D02.241.607 – keto acids ====
- MeSH D02.241.607.080 – acetoacetates
- MeSH D02.241.607.360 – hippurates
- MeSH D02.241.607.360.192 – aminohippuric acids
- MeSH D02.241.607.360.192.100 – p-aminohippuric acid
- MeSH D02.241.607.360.579 – iodohippuric acid
- MeSH D02.241.607.465 – ketoglutaric acids
- MeSH D02.241.607.547 – levulinic acids
- MeSH D02.241.607.547.276 – aminolevulinic acid
- MeSH D02.241.607.749 – oxaloacetic acids
- MeSH D02.241.607.749.765 – oxaloacetates
- MeSH D02.241.607.749.765.760 – oxaloacetate
- MeSH D02.241.607.812 – pyruvates
- MeSH D02.241.607.812.601 – phenylpyruvic acids
- MeSH D02.241.607.812.800 – pyruvic acid

=== MeSH D02.355 – ethers ===
==== MeSH D02.355.291 – ethers, cyclic ====
- MeSH D02.355.291.205 – ciguatoxins
- MeSH D02.355.291.308 – crown ethers
- MeSH D02.355.291.411 – epoxy compounds
- MeSH D02.355.291.411.400 – epichlorohydrin
- MeSH D02.355.291.411.417 – ethylene oxide
- MeSH D02.355.291.411.900 – trichloroepoxypropane
- MeSH D02.355.291.705 – okadaic acid
- MeSH D02.355.291.852 – oxepins
- MeSH D02.355.291.852.500 – doxepin
- MeSH D02.355.291.866 – oxocins

==== MeSH D02.355.417 – ethyl ethers ====
- MeSH D02.355.417.332 – ether, ethyl
- MeSH D02.355.417.515 – flurothyl
- MeSH D02.355.417.600 – methoxyflurane
- MeSH D02.355.417.650 – phenetidine

==== MeSH D02.355.460 – glyceryl ethers ====
- MeSH D02.355.460.750 – phospholipid ethers

==== MeSH D02.355.601 – methyl ethers ====
- MeSH D02.355.601.200 – anisoles
- MeSH D02.355.601.200.100 – anethole trithione
- MeSH D02.355.601.200.324 – butylated hydroxyanisole
- MeSH D02.355.601.250 – bis(chloromethyl) ether
- MeSH D02.355.601.400 – enflurane
- MeSH D02.355.601.536 – guaiacol
- MeSH D02.355.601.536.400 – guaifenesin
- MeSH D02.355.601.536.400.500 – methocarbamol
- MeSH D02.355.601.570 – isoflurane
- MeSH D02.355.601.620 – methoxyflurane

==== MeSH D02.355.726 – phenyl ethers ====
- MeSH D02.355.726.158 – anisoles
- MeSH D02.355.726.158.100 – anethole trithione
- MeSH D02.355.726.158.324 – butylated hydroxyanisole
- MeSH D02.355.726.453 – guaiacol
- MeSH D02.355.726.453.400 – guaifenesin
- MeSH D02.355.726.750 – phenetidine
- MeSH D02.355.726.900 – triclosan

=== MeSH D02.389 – free radicals ===
==== MeSH D02.389.678 – spin labels ====
- MeSH D02.389.678.900 – triacetoneamine-n-oxyl

=== MeSH D02.442 – hydrazines ===
==== MeSH D02.442.288 – hydrazones ====
- MeSH D02.442.288.200 – carbonyl cyanide m-chlorophenyl hydrazone
- MeSH D02.442.288.220 – carbonyl cyanide-p-trifluoromethoxyphenylhydrazone

==== MeSH D02.442.600 – methylhydrazines ====
- MeSH D02.442.600.400 – dimethylhydrazines
- MeSH D02.442.600.400.200 – 1,2-dimethylhydrazine
- MeSH D02.442.600.601 – monomethylhydrazine

==== MeSH D02.442.726 – phenylhydrazines ====
- MeSH D02.442.726.200 – dithizone

=== MeSH D02.455 – hydrocarbons ===
==== MeSH D02.455.326 – hydrocarbons, acyclic ====
- MeSH D02.455.326.146 – alkanes
- MeSH D02.455.326.146.100 – alkanesulfonic acids
- MeSH D02.455.326.146.100.050 – alkanesulfonates
- MeSH D02.455.326.146.100.050.490 – mesna
- MeSH D02.455.326.146.100.050.500 – mesylates
- MeSH D02.455.326.146.100.050.500.100 – busulfan
- MeSH D02.455.326.146.100.050.500.300 – ethyl methanesulfonate
- MeSH D02.455.326.146.100.050.500.500 – methyl methanesulfonate
- MeSH D02.455.326.146.100.250 – hepes
- MeSH D02.455.326.146.100.300 – isethionic acid
- MeSH D02.455.326.146.100.850 – taurine
- MeSH D02.455.326.146.100.850.875 – taurocholic acid
- MeSH D02.455.326.146.100.850.875.900 – taurodeoxycholic acid
- MeSH D02.455.326.146.100.850.875.900.875 – taurochenodeoxycholic acid
- MeSH D02.455.326.146.100.850.875.925 – taurolithocholic acid
- MeSH D02.455.326.146.216 – butanes
- MeSH D02.455.326.146.379 – ethane
- MeSH D02.455.326.146.379.350 – ethylene dichlorides
- MeSH D02.455.326.146.432 – fumonisins
- MeSH D02.455.326.146.485 – heptanes
- MeSH D02.455.326.146.485.222 – diarylheptanoids
- MeSH D02.455.326.146.485.222.222 – curcumin
- MeSH D02.455.326.146.500 – hexanes
- MeSH D02.455.326.146.571 – methane
- MeSH D02.455.326.146.571.850 – tetranitromethane
- MeSH D02.455.326.146.672 – nitroparaffins
- MeSH D02.455.326.146.672.800 – tetranitromethane
- MeSH D02.455.326.146.720 – octanes
- MeSH D02.455.326.146.770 – pentanes
- MeSH D02.455.326.146.800 – propane
- MeSH D02.455.326.271 – alkenes
- MeSH D02.455.326.271.122 – allyl compounds
- MeSH D02.455.326.271.122.100 – allylamine
- MeSH D02.455.326.271.122.260 – allylglycine
- MeSH D02.455.326.271.122.272 – allylisopropylacetamide
- MeSH D02.455.326.271.367 – ethylenes
- MeSH D02.455.326.271.367.300 – dichloroethylenes
- MeSH D02.455.326.271.665 – polyenes
- MeSH D02.455.326.271.665.146 – alkadienes
- MeSH D02.455.326.271.665.146.240 – butadienes
- MeSH D02.455.326.271.665.146.280 – chloroprene
- MeSH D02.455.326.271.665.155 – aurodox
- MeSH D02.455.326.271.665.250 – diphenylhexatriene
- MeSH D02.455.326.271.665.325 – filipin
- MeSH D02.455.326.271.665.400 – mepartricin
- MeSH D02.455.326.271.665.480 – neoprene
- MeSH D02.455.326.271.665.550 – polyethylenes
- MeSH D02.455.326.271.665.550.500 – polyethylene
- MeSH D02.455.326.271.665.550.600 – polyethyleneimine
- MeSH D02.455.326.271.665.590 – polypropylenes
- MeSH D02.455.326.271.665.616 – polyvinyls
- MeSH D02.455.326.271.665.806 – squalene
- MeSH D02.455.326.271.884 – vinyl compounds
- MeSH D02.455.326.271.884.533 – polyvinyls
- MeSH D02.455.326.271.884.533.532 – polyvinyl alcohol
- MeSH D02.455.326.271.884.533.565 – polyvinyl chloride
- MeSH D02.455.326.271.884.533.660 – polyvinylpyridine n-oxide
- MeSH D02.455.326.271.884.533.699 – povidone
- MeSH D02.455.326.271.884.533.710 – povidone-iodine
- MeSH D02.455.326.271.884.750 – vinyl chloride
- MeSH D02.455.326.397 – alkynes
- MeSH D02.455.326.397.259 – acetylene
- MeSH D02.455.326.397.300 – carbocyanines
- MeSH D02.455.326.397.325 – (4-(m-chlorophenylcarbamoyloxy)-2-butynyl)trimethylammonium chloride

==== MeSH D02.455.426 – hydrocarbons, cyclic ====
- MeSH D02.455.426.100 – bridged compounds
- MeSH D02.455.426.100.050 – adamantane
- MeSH D02.455.426.100.050.035 – amantadine
- MeSH D02.455.426.100.050.035.500 – memantine
- MeSH D02.455.426.100.050.392 – methenamine
- MeSH D02.455.426.100.050.750 – rimantadine
- MeSH D02.455.426.100.080 – bicyclo compounds
- MeSH D02.455.426.100.080.085 – bicyclo compounds, heterocyclic
- MeSH D02.455.426.100.080.100 – biperiden
- MeSH D02.455.426.392 – hydrocarbons, alicyclic
- MeSH D02.455.426.392.368 – cycloparaffins
- MeSH D02.455.426.392.368.075 – adamantane
- MeSH D02.455.426.392.368.075.750 – rimantadine
- MeSH D02.455.426.392.368.201 – cyclobutanes
- MeSH D02.455.426.392.368.242 – cyclodecanes
- MeSH D02.455.426.392.368.242.888 – taxoids
- MeSH D02.455.426.392.368.242.888.777 – paclitaxel
- MeSH D02.455.426.392.368.284 – cycloheptanes
- MeSH D02.455.426.392.368.284.049 – azulenes
- MeSH D02.455.426.392.368.284.100 – bencyclane
- MeSH D02.455.426.392.368.284.900 – tropolone
- MeSH D02.455.426.392.368.367 – cyclohexanes
- MeSH D02.455.426.392.368.367.190 – cuprizone
- MeSH D02.455.426.392.368.367.204 – cyclamates
- MeSH D02.455.426.392.368.367.218 – cyclohexanecarboxylic acids
- MeSH D02.455.426.392.368.367.318 – cyclohexanols
- MeSH D02.455.426.392.368.367.340 – cyclohexanones
- MeSH D02.455.426.392.368.367.418 – cyclohexylamines
- MeSH D02.455.426.392.368.367.440 – dicyclomine
- MeSH D02.455.426.392.368.367.652 – ketamine
- MeSH D02.455.426.392.368.367.751 – norisoprenoids
- MeSH D02.455.426.392.368.367.850 – tiletamine
- MeSH D02.455.426.392.368.367.900 – trans-1,4-bis(2-chlorobenzaminomethyl)cyclohexane dihydrochloride
- MeSH D02.455.426.392.368.408 – cyclooctanes
- MeSH D02.455.426.392.368.408.333 – iprindole
- MeSH D02.455.426.392.368.450 – cyclopentanes
- MeSH D02.455.426.392.368.450.350 – cycloleucine
- MeSH D02.455.426.392.368.533 – cyclopropanes
- MeSH D02.455.426.392.368.533.200 – cilastatin
- MeSH D02.455.426.392.368.533.450 – hypoglycins
- MeSH D02.455.426.559 – hydrocarbons, aromatic
- MeSH D02.455.426.559.222 – benzene
- MeSH D02.455.426.559.389 – benzene derivatives
- MeSH D02.455.426.559.389.048 – benzeneacetamides
- MeSH D02.455.426.559.389.048.088 – bufexamac
- MeSH D02.455.426.559.389.097 – benzenesulfonates
- MeSH D02.455.426.559.389.097.120 – calcium dobesilate
- MeSH D02.455.426.559.389.097.150 – 4-chloromercuribenzenesulfonate
- MeSH D02.455.426.559.389.097.250 – ethamsylate
- MeSH D02.455.426.559.389.097.280 – ferrozine
- MeSH D02.455.426.559.389.097.675 – polyanetholesulfonate
- MeSH D02.455.426.559.389.097.870 – tiron
- MeSH D02.455.426.559.389.115 – benzhydryl compounds
- MeSH D02.455.426.559.389.115.250 – diphenhydramine
- MeSH D02.455.426.559.389.115.250.250 – dimenhydrinate
- MeSH D02.455.426.559.389.115.475 – meclizine
- MeSH D02.455.426.559.389.115.500 – methylenebis(chloroaniline)
- MeSH D02.455.426.559.389.115.600 – orphenadrine
- MeSH D02.455.426.559.389.115.800 – terfenadine
- MeSH D02.455.426.559.389.140 – benzyl compounds
- MeSH D02.455.426.559.389.140.200 – benzyl alcohols
- MeSH D02.455.426.559.389.140.200.100 – benzyl alcohol
- MeSH D02.455.426.559.389.140.210 – benzylamines
- MeSH D02.455.426.559.389.140.210.650 – pargyline
- MeSH D02.455.426.559.389.140.308 – bibenzyls
- MeSH D02.455.426.559.389.140.400 – 2-hydroxy-5-nitrobenzyl bromide
- MeSH D02.455.426.559.389.140.450 – lignans
- MeSH D02.455.426.559.389.140.450.388 – flavonolignans
- MeSH D02.455.426.559.389.140.450.582 – nordihydroguaiaretic acid
- MeSH D02.455.426.559.389.140.450.777 – podophyllotoxin
- MeSH D02.455.426.559.389.150 – benzylidene compounds
- MeSH D02.455.426.559.389.150.700 – stilbenes
- MeSH D02.455.426.559.389.150.700.050 – 4-acetamido-4'-isothiocyanatostilbene-2,2'-disulfonic acid
- MeSH D02.455.426.559.389.150.700.075 – bibenzyls
- MeSH D02.455.426.559.389.150.700.100 – chlorotrianisene
- MeSH D02.455.426.559.389.150.700.125 – clomiphene
- MeSH D02.455.426.559.389.150.700.175 – diethylstilbestrol
- MeSH D02.455.426.559.389.150.700.175.450 – hexestrol
- MeSH D02.455.426.559.389.150.700.200 – 4,4'-diisothiocyanostilbene-2,2'-disulfonic acid
- MeSH D02.455.426.559.389.150.700.550 – stilbamidines
- MeSH D02.455.426.559.389.150.700.900 – tamoxifen
- MeSH D02.455.426.559.389.150.700.900.775 – raloxifene
- MeSH D02.455.426.559.389.150.700.900.900 – toremifene
- MeSH D02.455.426.559.389.150.750 – styrenes
- MeSH D02.455.426.559.389.150.750.800 – styrene
- MeSH D02.455.426.559.389.150.750.800.830 – polystyrenes
- MeSH D02.455.426.559.389.150.795 – tyrphostins
- MeSH D02.455.426.559.389.185 – biphenyl compounds
- MeSH D02.455.426.559.389.185.060 – aminobiphenyl compounds
- MeSH D02.455.426.559.389.185.100 – benzidines
- MeSH D02.455.426.559.389.185.200 – 3,3'-diaminobenzidine
- MeSH D02.455.426.559.389.185.220 – dianisidine
- MeSH D02.455.426.559.389.185.226 – 3,3'-dichlorobenzidine
- MeSH D02.455.426.559.389.185.475 – losartan
- MeSH D02.455.426.559.389.185.600 – niclofolan
- MeSH D02.455.426.559.389.185.680 – polybrominated biphenyls
- MeSH D02.455.426.559.389.185.698 – polychlorinated biphenyls
- MeSH D02.455.426.559.389.220 – bromobenzenes
- MeSH D02.455.426.559.389.261 – chlorobenzenes
- MeSH D02.455.426.559.389.261.190 – chlorophenols
- MeSH D02.455.426.559.389.261.190.350 – hexachlorophene
- MeSH D02.455.426.559.389.261.220 – dicofol
- MeSH D02.455.426.559.389.261.250 – dinitrochlorobenzene
- MeSH D02.455.426.559.389.261.400 – hexachlorobenzene
- MeSH D02.455.426.559.389.454 – iodobenzenes
- MeSH D02.455.426.559.389.454.300 – 3-iodobenzylguanidine
- MeSH D02.455.426.559.389.454.385 – iopanoic acid
- MeSH D02.455.426.559.389.454.400 – iophendylate
- MeSH D02.455.426.559.389.454.450 – ipodate
- MeSH D02.455.426.559.389.454.950 – tyropanoate
- MeSH D02.455.426.559.389.565 – nitrobenzenes
- MeSH D02.455.426.559.389.565.175 – chloramphenicol
- MeSH D02.455.426.559.389.565.175.850 – thiamphenicol
- MeSH D02.455.426.559.389.565.225 – dinitrobenzenes
- MeSH D02.455.426.559.389.565.250 – dinitrochlorobenzene
- MeSH D02.455.426.559.389.565.280 – dinitrofluorobenzene
- MeSH D02.455.426.559.389.565.880 – trinitrobenzenes
- MeSH D02.455.426.559.389.565.880.880 – trinitrobenzenesulfonic acid
- MeSH D02.455.426.559.389.750 – sulfanilic acids
- MeSH D02.455.426.559.389.805 – terphenyl compounds
- MeSH D02.455.426.559.389.805.700 – polychloroterphenyl compounds
- MeSH D02.455.426.559.389.832 – toluene
- MeSH D02.455.426.559.389.832.140 – bromcresol green
- MeSH D02.455.426.559.389.832.150 – bromcresol purple
- MeSH D02.455.426.559.389.832.180 – bromphenol blue
- MeSH D02.455.426.559.389.832.200 – bromthymol blue
- MeSH D02.455.426.559.389.832.500 – toluene 2,4-diisocyanate
- MeSH D02.455.426.559.389.832.559 – toluidines
- MeSH D02.455.426.559.389.832.661 – tosyl compounds
- MeSH D02.455.426.559.389.832.670 – tosylarginine methyl ester
- MeSH D02.455.426.559.389.832.690 – tosyllysine chloromethyl ketone
- MeSH D02.455.426.559.389.832.710 – tosylphenylalanyl chloromethyl ketone
- MeSH D02.455.426.559.389.832.767 – trifluralin
- MeSH D02.455.426.559.389.832.868 – trinitrotoluene
- MeSH D02.455.426.559.389.875 – triparanol
- MeSH D02.455.426.559.389.884 – trityl compounds
- MeSH D02.455.426.559.389.948 – xylenes
- MeSH D02.455.426.559.694 – diarylheptanoids
- MeSH D02.455.426.559.694.222 – curcumin

==== MeSH D02.455.526 – hydrocarbons, halogenated ====
- MeSH D02.455.526.340 – halothane
- MeSH D02.455.526.368 – hydrocarbons, brominated
- MeSH D02.455.526.368.150 – bromobenzenes
- MeSH D02.455.526.368.200 – bromotrichloromethane
- MeSH D02.455.526.368.225 – ethylene dibromide
- MeSH D02.455.526.368.700 – polybrominated biphenyls
- MeSH D02.455.526.439 – hydrocarbons, chlorinated
- MeSH D02.455.526.439.042 – aldrin
- MeSH D02.455.526.439.150 – carbon tetrachloride
- MeSH D02.455.526.439.180 – chlordan
- MeSH D02.455.526.439.190 – chlordecone
- MeSH D02.455.526.439.202 – chlorobenzenes
- MeSH D02.455.526.439.202.190 – dicofol
- MeSH D02.455.526.439.202.200 – dinitrochlorobenzene
- MeSH D02.455.526.439.202.400 – hexachlorobenzene
- MeSH D02.455.526.439.220 – chlorofluorocarbons
- MeSH D02.455.526.439.220.300 – chlorofluorocarbons, methane
- MeSH D02.455.526.439.224 – chloroform
- MeSH D02.455.526.439.224.200 – bromotrichloromethane
- MeSH D02.455.526.439.294 – dichlorodiphenyldichloroethane
- MeSH D02.455.526.439.315 – dichlorodiphenyl dichloroethylene
- MeSH D02.455.526.439.337 – ddt
- MeSH D02.455.526.439.350 – dichloroethylenes
- MeSH D02.455.526.439.371 – dieldrin
- MeSH D02.455.526.439.416 – endrin
- MeSH D02.455.526.439.447 – ethyl chloride
- MeSH D02.455.526.439.458 – ethylene dichlorides
- MeSH D02.455.526.439.516 – heptachlor
- MeSH D02.455.526.439.516.350 – heptachlor epoxide
- MeSH D02.455.526.439.600 – lindane
- MeSH D02.455.526.439.610 – methoxychlor
- MeSH D02.455.526.439.632 – methyl chloride
- MeSH D02.455.526.439.642 – methylene chloride
- MeSH D02.455.526.439.659 – mirex
- MeSH D02.455.526.439.681 – mitotane
- MeSH D02.455.526.439.750 – picryl chloride
- MeSH D02.455.526.439.773 – polychlorinated biphenyls
- MeSH D02.455.526.439.773.292 – aroclors
- MeSH D02.455.526.439.773.292.077 – aroclor 1254
- MeSH D02.455.526.439.785 – polychloroterphenyl compounds
- MeSH D02.455.526.439.785.292 – aroclors
- MeSH D02.455.526.439.785.292.077 – aroclor 1254
- MeSH D02.455.526.439.880 – tetrachloroethylene
- MeSH D02.455.526.439.913 – toxaphene
- MeSH D02.455.526.439.920 – trichloroepoxypropane
- MeSH D02.455.526.439.927 – trichloroethanes
- MeSH D02.455.526.439.939 – trichloroethylene
- MeSH D02.455.526.439.975 – vinyl chloride
- MeSH D02.455.526.510 – hydrocarbons, fluorinated
- MeSH D02.455.526.510.140 – chlorofluorocarbons
- MeSH D02.455.526.510.140.300 – chlorofluorocarbons, methane
- MeSH D02.455.526.510.432 – fluorobenzenes
- MeSH D02.455.526.510.435 – fluorocarbons
- MeSH D02.455.526.581 – hydrocarbons, iodinated
- MeSH D02.455.526.581.496 – iodobenzenes
- MeSH D02.455.526.581.496.300 – 3-iodobenzylguanidine
- MeSH D02.455.526.581.496.385 – iopanoic acid
- MeSH D02.455.526.581.496.400 – iophendylate
- MeSH D02.455.526.581.496.450 – ipodate
- MeSH D02.455.526.581.496.950 – tyropanoate
- MeSH D02.455.526.728 – mustard compounds
- MeSH D02.455.526.728.468 – mustard gas
- MeSH D02.455.526.728.650 – nitrogen mustard compounds
- MeSH D02.455.526.728.650.050 – aniline mustard
- MeSH D02.455.526.728.650.156 – chlorambucil
- MeSH D02.455.526.728.650.156.700 – prednimustine
- MeSH D02.455.526.728.650.275 – estramustine
- MeSH D02.455.526.728.650.463 – mannomustine
- MeSH D02.455.526.728.650.529 – mechlorethamine
- MeSH D02.455.526.728.650.594 – melphalan
- MeSH D02.455.526.728.650.594.690 – peptichemio
- MeSH D02.455.526.728.650.730 – phosphoramide mustards
- MeSH D02.455.526.728.650.730.243 – cyclophosphamide
- MeSH D02.455.526.728.650.730.243.250 – ifosfamide
- MeSH D02.455.526.728.650.740 – propylbenzilylcholine mustard
- MeSH D02.455.526.728.650.760 – quinacrine mustard
- MeSH D02.455.526.728.650.913 – uracil mustard
- MeSH D02.455.526.913 – trihalomethanes
- MeSH D02.455.526.913.810 – chloroform

==== MeSH D02.455.699 – petrolatum ====
- MeSH D02.455.699.500 – mineral oil

==== MeSH D02.455.849 – terpenes ====
- MeSH D02.455.849.090 – cannabinoids
- MeSH D02.455.849.090.100 – cannabidiol
- MeSH D02.455.849.090.110 – cannabinol
- MeSH D02.455.849.090.810 – tetrahydrocannabinol
- MeSH D02.455.849.131 – carotenoids
- MeSH D02.455.849.131.123 – beta carotene
- MeSH D02.455.849.131.309 – norisoprenoids
- MeSH D02.455.849.131.495 – retinoids
- MeSH D02.455.849.131.495.050 – acitretin
- MeSH D02.455.849.131.495.250 – etretinate
- MeSH D02.455.849.131.495.270 – fenretinide
- MeSH D02.455.849.131.495.325 – isotretinoin
- MeSH D02.455.849.131.495.690 – retinaldehyde
- MeSH D02.455.849.131.495.818 – vitamin a
- MeSH D02.455.849.131.495.818.800 – tretinoin
- MeSH D02.455.849.131.868 – xanthophylls
- MeSH D02.455.849.131.868.249 – canthaxanthin
- MeSH D02.455.849.131.868.500 – lutein
- MeSH D02.455.849.131.912 – zeta carotene
- MeSH D02.455.849.291 – diterpenes
- MeSH D02.455.849.291.037 – aconitine
- MeSH D02.455.849.291.075 – aphidicolin
- MeSH D02.455.849.291.162 – atractyloside
- MeSH D02.455.849.291.206 – diterpenes, abietane
- MeSH D02.455.849.291.228 – diterpenes, clerodane
- MeSH D02.455.849.291.239 – diterpenes, kaurane
- MeSH D02.455.849.291.239.500 – gibberellins
- MeSH D02.455.849.291.300 – forskolin
- MeSH D02.455.849.291.400 – ginkgolides
- MeSH D02.455.849.291.400.500 – bilobalides
- MeSH D02.455.849.291.500 – phorbols
- MeSH D02.455.849.291.500.510 – phorbol esters
- MeSH D02.455.849.291.500.510.700 – phorbol 12,13-dibutyrate
- MeSH D02.455.849.291.500.510.850 – tetradecanoylphorbol acetate
- MeSH D02.455.849.291.515 – phytanic acid
- MeSH D02.455.849.291.523 – phytol
- MeSH D02.455.849.291.523.500 – vitamin k
- MeSH D02.455.849.291.523.500.689 – vitamin k 1
- MeSH D02.455.849.291.523.500.844 – vitamin k 2
- MeSH D02.455.849.291.523.500.922 – vitamin k 3
- MeSH D02.455.849.291.850 – taxoids
- MeSH D02.455.849.291.850.777 – paclitaxel
- MeSH D02.455.849.365 – dolichol
- MeSH D02.455.849.365.250 – dolichol phosphates
- MeSH D02.455.849.440 – gefarnate
- MeSH D02.455.849.486 – hemiterpenes
- MeSH D02.455.849.575 – monoterpenes
- MeSH D02.455.849.575.500 – iridoids
- MeSH D02.455.849.575.750 – menthol
- MeSH D02.455.849.575.781 – norbornanes
- MeSH D02.455.849.575.781.234 – bornanes
- MeSH D02.455.849.575.781.234.326 – camphor
- MeSH D02.455.849.575.781.500 – mecamylamine
- MeSH D02.455.849.575.781.795 – toxaphene
- MeSH D02.455.849.575.812 – pyrethrins
- MeSH D02.455.849.575.812.272 – allethrin
- MeSH D02.455.849.575.812.636 – permethrin
- MeSH D02.455.849.575.875 – thymol
- MeSH D02.455.849.575.875.200 – bromthymol blue
- MeSH D02.455.849.690 – polyisoprenyl phosphates
- MeSH D02.455.849.690.250 – dolichol phosphates
- MeSH D02.455.849.690.700 – polyisoprenyl phosphate sugars
- MeSH D02.455.849.690.700.700 – polyisoprenyl phosphate monosaccharides
- MeSH D02.455.849.690.700.700.250 – dolichol monophosphate mannose
- MeSH D02.455.849.690.700.710 – polyisoprenyl phosphate oligosaccharides
- MeSH D02.455.849.765 – sesquiterpenes
- MeSH D02.455.849.765.033 – abscisic acid
- MeSH D02.455.849.765.211 – artemisinins
- MeSH D02.455.849.765.424 – farnesol
- MeSH D02.455.849.765.444 – gossypol
- MeSH D02.455.849.765.750 – santonin
- MeSH D02.455.849.765.775 – sesquiterpenes, eudesmane
- MeSH D02.455.849.765.787 – sesquiterpenes, germacrane
- MeSH D02.455.849.765.793 – sesquiterpenes, guaiane
- MeSH D02.455.849.765.800 – thapsigargin
- MeSH D02.455.849.765.850 – trichothecenes
- MeSH D02.455.849.765.850.870 – t-2 toxin
- MeSH D02.455.849.765.850.900 – trichodermin
- MeSH D02.455.849.919 – triterpenes
- MeSH D02.455.849.919.277 – ginsenosides
- MeSH D02.455.849.919.300 – glycyrrhetinic acid
- MeSH D02.455.849.919.300.250 – carbenoxolone
- MeSH D02.455.849.919.305 – glycyrrhizic acid
- MeSH D02.455.849.919.490 – limonins
- MeSH D02.455.849.919.570 – quassins
- MeSH D02.455.849.919.570.500 – glaucarubin
- MeSH D02.455.849.919.650 – sapogenins
- MeSH D02.455.849.919.650.600 – oleanolic acid
- MeSH D02.455.849.919.681 – squalene

=== MeSH D02.478 – imides ===
==== MeSH D02.478.400 – imidoesters ====
- MeSH D02.478.400.175 – dimethyl adipimidate
- MeSH D02.478.400.200 – dimethyl suberimidate

==== MeSH D02.478.440 – maleimides ====
- MeSH D02.478.440.418 – ethylmaleimide

==== MeSH D02.478.600 – phthalimides ====
- MeSH D02.478.600.500 – chlorthalidone

==== MeSH D02.478.770 – succinimides ====
- MeSH D02.478.770.150 – bromosuccinimide
- MeSH D02.478.770.333 – ethosuximide

=== MeSH D02.491 – imines ===
==== MeSH D02.491.203 – carbodiimides ====
- MeSH D02.491.203.340 – cme-carbodiimide
- MeSH D02.491.203.385 – dicyclohexylcarbodiimide
- MeSH D02.491.203.425 – ethyl(dimethylaminopropyl) carbodiimide

==== MeSH D02.491.485 – imino acids ====
- MeSH D02.491.485.100 – azetidinecarboxylic acid
- MeSH D02.491.485.400 – technetium tc 99m diethyl-iminodiacetic acid
- MeSH D02.491.485.450 – technetium tc 99m disofenin
- MeSH D02.491.485.900 – technetium tc 99m lidofenin

==== MeSH D02.491.567 – imino sugars ====
- MeSH D02.491.567.249 – imino furanoses
- MeSH D02.491.567.500 – imino pyranoses

=== MeSH D02.500 – isocyanates ===
==== MeSH D02.500.375 – isothiocyanates ====
- MeSH D02.500.375.050 – 4-acetamido-4'-isothiocyanatostilbene-2,2'-disulfonic acid
- MeSH D02.500.375.125 – 4,4'-diisothiocyanostilbene-2,2'-disulfonic acid
- MeSH D02.500.375.250 – fluorescein-5-isothiocyanate
- MeSH D02.500.375.625 – 1-naphthylisothiocyanate

=== MeSH D02.522 – ketones ===
==== MeSH D02.522.120 – acetophenones ====
- MeSH D02.522.120.100 – benzoin
- MeSH D02.522.120.575 – omega-chloroacetophenone

==== MeSH D02.522.223 – benzophenones ====
- MeSH D02.522.223.500 – chlorthalidone

==== MeSH D02.522.296 – butanones ====
- MeSH D02.522.296.100 – acetoin
- MeSH D02.522.296.400 – diacetyl
- MeSH D02.522.296.900 – thenoyltrifluoroacetone

==== MeSH D02.522.352 – butyrophenones ====
- MeSH D02.522.352.110 – azaperone
- MeSH D02.522.352.155 – benperidol
- MeSH D02.522.352.343 – droperidol
- MeSH D02.522.352.506 – haloperidol
- MeSH D02.522.352.800 – spiperone
- MeSH D02.522.352.867 – trifluperidol

==== MeSH D02.522.400 – cyclohexanones ====
- MeSH D02.522.400.850 – tiletamine

==== MeSH D02.522.520 – hexanones ====
- MeSH D02.522.520.500 – methyl n-butyl ketone

==== MeSH D02.522.585 – ketone bodies ====
- MeSH D02.522.585.175 – acetoacetates
- MeSH D02.522.585.342 – acetone

==== MeSH D02.522.675 – methadone ====
- MeSH D02.522.675.500 – methadyl acetate

==== MeSH D02.522.818 – propiophenones ====
- MeSH D02.522.818.110 – bupropion
- MeSH D02.522.818.222 – chalcones
- MeSH D02.522.818.222.500 – chalcone
- MeSH D02.522.818.561 – hydroxypropiophenone
- MeSH D02.522.818.561.602 – phloretin
- MeSH D02.522.818.561.602.615 – polyphloretin phosphate
- MeSH D02.522.818.600 – kynuramine
- MeSH D02.522.818.800 – oxyfedrine
- MeSH D02.522.818.830 – propafenone
- MeSH D02.522.818.950 – tolperisone

=== MeSH D02.540 – lactones ===
==== MeSH D02.540.505 – macrolides ====
- MeSH D02.540.505.050 – amphotericin b
- MeSH D02.540.505.075 – antimycin a
- MeSH D02.540.505.100 – brefeldin a
- MeSH D02.540.505.125 – candicidin
- MeSH D02.540.505.187 – epothilones
- MeSH D02.540.505.250 – erythromycin
- MeSH D02.540.505.250.050 – azithromycin
- MeSH D02.540.505.250.100 – clarithromycin
- MeSH D02.540.505.250.250 – erythromycin estolate
- MeSH D02.540.505.250.260 – erythromycin ethylsuccinate
- MeSH D02.540.505.250.445 – ketolides
- MeSH D02.540.505.250.630 – roxithromycin
- MeSH D02.540.505.330 – ivermectin
- MeSH D02.540.505.410 – josamycin
- MeSH D02.540.505.440 – leucomycins
- MeSH D02.540.505.440.450 – kitasamycin
- MeSH D02.540.505.440.725 – spiramycin
- MeSH D02.540.505.450 – lucensomycin
- MeSH D02.540.505.495 – maytansine
- MeSH D02.540.505.497 – mepartricin
- MeSH D02.540.505.500 – miocamycin
- MeSH D02.540.505.550 – natamycin
- MeSH D02.540.505.575 – nystatin
- MeSH D02.540.505.600 – oleandomycin
- MeSH D02.540.505.600.800 – troleandomycin
- MeSH D02.540.505.620 – oligomycins
- MeSH D02.540.505.620.750 – rutamycin
- MeSH D02.540.505.760 – sirolimus
- MeSH D02.540.505.810 – tacrolimus
- MeSH D02.540.505.905 – tylosin

==== MeSH D02.540.950 – zearalenone ====
- MeSH D02.540.950.975 – zeranol

=== MeSH D02.626 – nitriles ===
==== MeSH D02.626.080 – acetonitriles ====
- MeSH D02.626.080.085 – aminoacetonitrile

==== MeSH D02.626.809 – rilpivirine ====
- MeSH D02.626.809.500 – emtricitabine, rilpivirine, tenofovir drug combination

=== MeSH D02.640 – nitro compounds ===
==== MeSH D02.640.529 – nitrobenzenes ====
- MeSH D02.640.529.175 – chloramphenicol
- MeSH D02.640.529.175.850 – thiamphenicol
- MeSH D02.640.529.240 – dinitrobenzenes
- MeSH D02.640.529.240.250 – dinitrochlorobenzene
- MeSH D02.640.529.240.280 – dinitrofluorobenzene
- MeSH D02.640.529.880 – trinitrobenzenes
- MeSH D02.640.529.880.607 – picryl chloride
- MeSH D02.640.529.880.900 – trinitrobenzenesulfonic acid

==== MeSH D02.640.600 – nitrofurans ====
- MeSH D02.640.600.200 – 5-amino-3-((5-nitro-2-furyl)vinyl)-1,2,4-oxadiazole
- MeSH D02.640.600.290 – fanft
- MeSH D02.640.600.308 – furagin
- MeSH D02.640.600.313 – furazolidone
- MeSH D02.640.600.330 – furylfuramide
- MeSH D02.640.600.410 – nifuratel
- MeSH D02.640.600.480 – nifurtimox
- MeSH D02.640.600.566 – nitrofurantoin
- MeSH D02.640.600.691 – nitrofurazone
- MeSH D02.640.600.750 – nitrovin

==== MeSH D02.640.672 – nitroimidazoles ====
- MeSH D02.640.672.200 – dimetridazole
- MeSH D02.640.672.250 – etanidazole
- MeSH D02.640.672.400 – ipronidazole
- MeSH D02.640.672.500 – metronidazole
- MeSH D02.640.672.530 – misonidazole
- MeSH D02.640.672.580 – nimorazole
- MeSH D02.640.672.700 – ornidazole
- MeSH D02.640.672.730 – ronidazole
- MeSH D02.640.672.900 – tinidazole

==== MeSH D02.640.720 – nitroparaffins ====
- MeSH D02.640.720.800 – tetranitromethane

==== MeSH D02.640.743 – nitrophenols ====
- MeSH D02.640.743.304 – dinitrophenols
- MeSH D02.640.743.304.250 – 2,4-dinitrophenol
- MeSH D02.640.743.400 – 2-hydroxy-5-nitrobenzyl bromide
- MeSH D02.640.743.600 – niclofolan
- MeSH D02.640.743.610 – nitrohydroxyiodophenylacetate
- MeSH D02.640.743.620 – nitroxinil
- MeSH D02.640.743.690 – picrates

==== MeSH D02.640.820 – nitroquinolines ====
- MeSH D02.640.820.600 – 4-nitroquinoline-1-oxide

=== MeSH D02.654 – nitroso compounds ===
==== MeSH D02.654.442 – nitrosamines ====
- MeSH D02.654.442.100 – butylhydroxybutylnitrosamine
- MeSH D02.654.442.200 – diethylnitrosamine
- MeSH D02.654.442.225 – dimethylnitrosamine
- MeSH D02.654.442.550 – n-nitrosopyrrolidine

==== MeSH D02.654.567 – nitrosoguanidines ====
- MeSH D02.654.567.400 – methylnitronitrosoguanidine

==== MeSH D02.654.692 – nitrosourea compounds ====
- MeSH D02.654.692.247 – carmustine
- MeSH D02.654.692.300 – ethylnitrosourea
- MeSH D02.654.692.440 – lomustine
- MeSH D02.654.692.440.700 – semustine
- MeSH D02.654.692.480 – methylnitrosourea
- MeSH D02.654.692.550 – nimustine
- MeSH D02.654.692.768 – streptozocin

==== MeSH D02.654.846 – reactive nitrogen species ====
- MeSH D02.654.846.500 – s-nitrosothiols
- MeSH D02.654.846.500.124 – s-nitroso-n-acetylpenicillamine
- MeSH D02.654.846.500.249 – s-nitrosoglutathione

=== MeSH D02.675 – onium compounds ===
==== MeSH D02.675.276 – quaternary ammonium compounds ====
- MeSH D02.675.276.046 – ambenonium chloride
- MeSH D02.675.276.080 – benzalkonium compounds
- MeSH D02.675.276.090 – benzethonium
- MeSH D02.675.276.102 – bephenium compounds
- MeSH D02.675.276.125 – betaine
- MeSH D02.675.276.136 – betalains
- MeSH D02.675.276.136.500 – betacyanins
- MeSH D02.675.276.136.555 – betaxanthins
- MeSH D02.675.276.148 – bethanechol compounds
- MeSH D02.675.276.148.100 – bethanechol
- MeSH D02.675.276.175 – bretylium compounds
- MeSH D02.675.276.175.150 – bretylium tosylate
- MeSH D02.675.276.190 – cetrimonium compounds
- MeSH D02.675.276.200 – chlorisondamine
- MeSH D02.675.276.207 – chlormequat
- MeSH D02.675.276.210 – (4-(m-chlorophenylcarbamoyloxy)-2-butynyl)trimethylammonium chloride
- MeSH D02.675.276.232 – choline
- MeSH D02.675.276.232.100 – benzoylcholine
- MeSH D02.675.276.232.115 – carbachol
- MeSH D02.675.276.232.130 – cytidine diphosphate choline
- MeSH D02.675.276.232.700 – phosphorylcholine
- MeSH D02.675.276.232.710 – platelet activating factor
- MeSH D02.675.276.232.720 – propylbenzilylcholine mustard
- MeSH D02.675.276.232.780 – succinylcholine
- MeSH D02.675.276.232.800 – thiocholine
- MeSH D02.675.276.232.800.030 – acetylthiocholine
- MeSH D02.675.276.232.800.200 – butyrylthiocholine
- MeSH D02.675.276.352 – edrophonium
- MeSH D02.675.276.370 – emepronium
- MeSH D02.675.276.400 – gallamine triethiodide
- MeSH D02.675.276.425 – glycopyrrolate
- MeSH D02.675.276.435 – hemicholinium 3
- MeSH D02.675.276.475 – lissamine green dyes
- MeSH D02.675.276.534 – methacholine compounds
- MeSH D02.675.276.534.500 – methacholine chloride
- MeSH D02.675.276.558 – bis-trimethylammonium compounds
- MeSH D02.675.276.558.372 – decamethonium compounds
- MeSH D02.675.276.558.592 – hexamethonium compounds
- MeSH D02.675.276.558.592.500 – hexamethonium
- MeSH D02.675.276.580 – muscarine
- MeSH D02.675.276.602 – neostigmine
- MeSH D02.675.276.648 – oxyphenonium
- MeSH D02.675.276.700 – propantheline
- MeSH D02.675.276.787 – tetraethylammonium compounds
- MeSH D02.675.276.787.500 – tetraethylammonium
- MeSH D02.675.276.844 – toxiferine
- MeSH D02.675.276.844.050 – alcuronium
- MeSH D02.675.276.922 – tubocurarine

=== MeSH D02.691 – organometallic compounds ===
==== MeSH D02.691.088 – arsenicals ====
- MeSH D02.691.088.030 – arsanilic acid
- MeSH D02.691.088.040 – arsenamide
- MeSH D02.691.088.042 – arsenates
- MeSH D02.691.088.044 – arsenazo iii
- MeSH D02.691.088.047 – arsenites
- MeSH D02.691.088.050 – arsphenamine
- MeSH D02.691.088.060 – p-azobenzenearsonate
- MeSH D02.691.088.100 – cacodylic acid
- MeSH D02.691.088.500 – melarsoprol
- MeSH D02.691.088.700 – roxarsone

==== MeSH D02.691.675 – organogold compounds ====
- MeSH D02.691.675.249 – aurothioglucose
- MeSH D02.691.675.249.150 – auranofin
- MeSH D02.691.675.500 – gold sodium thiomalate

==== MeSH D02.691.750 – organomercury compounds ====
- MeSH D02.691.750.100 – alkylmercury compounds
- MeSH D02.691.750.100.229 – chlormerodrin
- MeSH D02.691.750.100.347 – ethylmercury compounds
- MeSH D02.691.750.100.347.350 – cialit
- MeSH D02.691.750.100.347.417 – ethylmercuric chloride
- MeSH D02.691.750.100.347.850 – thimerosal
- MeSH D02.691.750.100.710 – mersalyl
- MeSH D02.691.750.100.738 – methylmercury compounds
- MeSH D02.691.750.575 – merbromin
- MeSH D02.691.750.740 – phenylmercury compounds
- MeSH D02.691.750.740.225 – chloromercurinitrophenols
- MeSH D02.691.750.740.250 – 4-chloromercuribenzenesulfonate
- MeSH D02.691.750.740.644 – mercuribenzoates
- MeSH D02.691.750.740.644.261 – chloromercuribenzoates
- MeSH D02.691.750.740.644.261.275 – p-chloromercuribenzoic acid
- MeSH D02.691.750.740.644.450 – hydroxymercuribenzoates
- MeSH D02.691.750.740.760 – phenylmercuric acetate

==== MeSH D02.691.800 – organoplatinum compounds ====
- MeSH D02.691.800.338 – carboplatin

==== MeSH D02.691.825 – organotechnetium compounds ====
- MeSH D02.691.825.375 – technetium tc 99m aggregated albumin
- MeSH D02.691.825.445 – technetium tc 99m diethyl-iminodiacetic acid
- MeSH D02.691.825.468 – technetium tc 99m dimercaptosuccinic acid
- MeSH D02.691.825.475 – technetium tc 99m disofenin
- MeSH D02.691.825.562 – technetium tc 99m exametazime
- MeSH D02.691.825.710 – technetium tc 99m lidofenin
- MeSH D02.691.825.750 – technetium tc 99m medronate
- MeSH D02.691.825.775 – technetium tc 99m mertiatide
- MeSH D02.691.825.875 – technetium tc 99m pentetate
- MeSH D02.691.825.937 – technetium tc 99m sestamibi

==== MeSH D02.691.850 – organotin compounds ====
- MeSH D02.691.850.900 – trialkyltin compounds
- MeSH D02.691.850.900.910 – triethyltin compounds
- MeSH D02.691.850.900.950 – trimethyltin compounds

=== MeSH D02.705 – organophosphorus compounds ===
==== MeSH D02.705.539 – organothiophosphorus compounds ====
- MeSH D02.705.539.060 – amifostine
- MeSH D02.705.539.094 – azinphosmethyl
- MeSH D02.705.539.170 – chlorpyrifos
- MeSH D02.705.539.199 – coumaphos
- MeSH D02.705.539.208 – cystaphos
- MeSH D02.705.539.220 – diazinon
- MeSH D02.705.539.245 – dimethoate
- MeSH D02.705.539.270 – disulfoton
- MeSH D02.705.539.341 – echothiophate iodide
- MeSH D02.705.539.456 – fenitrothion
- MeSH D02.705.539.460 – fenthion
- MeSH D02.705.539.464 – fonofos
- MeSH D02.705.539.500 – leptophos
- MeSH D02.705.539.639 – malathion
- MeSH D02.705.539.746 – parathion
- MeSH D02.705.539.746.500 – methyl parathion
- MeSH D02.705.539.750 – phenylphosphonothioic acid, 2-ethyl 2-(4-nitrophenyl) ester
- MeSH D02.705.539.783 – phorate
- MeSH D02.705.539.790 – phosmet
- MeSH D02.705.539.900 – temefos
- MeSH D02.705.539.926 – thiophosphoric acid esters
- MeSH D02.705.539.950 – thiotepa

==== MeSH D02.705.639 – phosphonic acids ====
- MeSH D02.705.639.250 – fosfomycin
- MeSH D02.705.639.590 – phosphonoacetic acid
- MeSH D02.705.639.590.500 – foscarnet
- MeSH D02.705.639.930 – trichlorfon

=== MeSH D02.715 – organosilicon compounds ===
==== MeSH D02.715.650 – siloxanes ====
- MeSH D02.715.650.700 – silicones
- MeSH D02.715.650.700.150 – dimethylpolysiloxanes
- MeSH D02.715.650.700.150.750 – simethicone
- MeSH D02.715.650.700.755 – silicone gels
- MeSH D02.715.650.700.800 – silicone oils

=== MeSH D02.755 – phenols (Reclassified to D02.455.559.389.657) ===
==== MeSH D02.755.075 – anisoles ====
- MeSH D02.755.075.100 – anethole trithione
- MeSH D02.755.075.241 – butylated hydroxyanisole
- MeSH D02.755.075.536 – guaiacol
- MeSH D02.755.075.536.400 – guaifenesin
- MeSH D02.755.075.536.400.500 – methocarbamol

==== MeSH D02.755.166 – catechols ====
- MeSH D02.755.166.200 – curcumin
- MeSH D02.755.166.350 – estrogens, catechol
- MeSH D02.755.166.350.350 – hydroxyestrones
- MeSH D02.755.166.453 – guaiacol
- MeSH D02.755.166.453.400 – guaifenesin
- MeSH D02.755.166.500 – 3-methoxy-4-hydroxyphenylethanol
- MeSH D02.755.166.550 – nordihydroguaiaretic acid
- MeSH D02.755.166.850 – tiron

==== MeSH D02.755.190 – chlorophenols ====
- MeSH D02.755.190.270 – dichlorophen
- MeSH D02.755.190.350 – hexachlorophene
- MeSH D02.755.190.633 – pentachlorophenol

==== MeSH D02.755.239 – cresols ====
- MeSH D02.755.239.132 – bisacodyl
- MeSH D02.755.239.180 – brocresine
- MeSH D02.755.239.190 – bromcresol green
- MeSH D02.755.239.195 – bromcresol purple
- MeSH D02.755.239.216 – butylated hydroxytoluene
- MeSH D02.755.239.327 – creosote
- MeSH D02.755.239.402 – cyclofenil
- MeSH D02.755.239.493 – dinitrocresols
- MeSH D02.755.239.611 – formocresols
- MeSH D02.755.239.900 – tritolyl phosphates

==== MeSH D02.755.410 – hydroxybenzoic acids ====
- MeSH D02.755.410.350 – gallic acid
- MeSH D02.755.410.350.299 – hydrolyzable tannins
- MeSH D02.755.410.350.600 – propyl gallate
- MeSH D02.755.410.450 – hydroxymercuribenzoates
- MeSH D02.755.410.585 – pactamycin
- MeSH D02.755.410.600 – parabens
- MeSH D02.755.410.700 – salicylic acids
- MeSH D02.755.410.700.050 – aminosalicylic acids
- MeSH D02.755.410.700.050.060 – p-aminosalicylic acid
- MeSH D02.755.410.700.050.500 – mesalamine
- MeSH D02.755.410.700.062 – anacardic acids
- MeSH D02.755.410.700.075 – aspirin
- MeSH D02.755.410.700.300 – diflunisal
- MeSH D02.755.410.700.800 – salicylic acid
- MeSH D02.755.410.700.800.810 – salicylates
- MeSH D02.755.410.700.800.810.405 – gentisates
- MeSH D02.755.410.700.800.810.810 – sodium salicylate
- MeSH D02.755.410.850 – vanillic acid

==== MeSH D02.755.446 – indophenol ====
- MeSH D02.755.446.250 – 2,6-dichloroindophenol

==== MeSH D02.755.566 – nitrophenols ====
- MeSH D02.755.566.304 – dinitrophenols
- MeSH D02.755.566.304.500 – 2,4-dinitrophenol
- MeSH D02.755.566.400 – 2-hydroxy-5-nitrobenzyl bromide
- MeSH D02.755.566.600 – niclofolan
- MeSH D02.755.566.610 – nitrohydroxyiodophenylacetate
- MeSH D02.755.566.620 – nitroxinil
- MeSH D02.755.566.690 – picrates

==== MeSH D02.755.625 – phenolphthaleins ====
- MeSH D02.755.625.555 – phenolphthalein
- MeSH D02.755.625.560 – phenolsulfonphthalein
- MeSH D02.755.625.617 – sulfobromophthalein
- MeSH D02.755.625.808 – thymolphthalein

==== MeSH D02.755.684 – phloroglucinol ====
- MeSH D02.755.684.602 – phloretin
- MeSH D02.755.684.602.615 – polyphloretin phosphate

==== MeSH D02.755.852 – resorcinols ====
- MeSH D02.755.852.467 – hexylresorcinol
- MeSH D02.755.852.900 – zearalenone
- MeSH D02.755.852.900.975 – zeranol

=== MeSH D02.806 – quinones ===
==== MeSH D02.806.100 – anthraquinones ====
- MeSH D02.806.100.200 – carmine
- MeSH D02.806.100.205 – cascara
- MeSH D02.806.100.205.400 – emodin
- MeSH D02.806.100.500 – mitoxantrone

==== MeSH D02.806.250 – benzoquinones ====
- MeSH D02.806.250.180 – carbazilquinone
- MeSH D02.806.250.210 – chloranil
- MeSH D02.806.250.280 – dibromothymoquinone
- MeSH D02.806.250.700 – plastoquinone
- MeSH D02.806.250.900 – ubiquinone

==== MeSH D02.806.400 – indolequinones ====
- MeSH D02.806.400.249 – mitomycins
- MeSH D02.806.400.249.350 – mitomycin
- MeSH D02.806.400.249.700 – porfiromycin
- MeSH D02.806.400.500 – pyrroloiminoquinones

==== MeSH D02.806.550 – naphthoquinones ====
- MeSH D02.806.550.625 – vitamin k 1
- MeSH D02.806.550.750 – vitamin k 2
- MeSH D02.806.550.875 – vitamin k 3

=== MeSH D02.845 – semicarbazides ===
==== MeSH D02.845.746 – semicarbazones ====
- MeSH D02.845.746.703 – thiosemicarbazones
- MeSH D02.845.746.703.450 – methisazone
- MeSH D02.845.746.703.702 – thioacetazone

=== MeSH D02.886 – sulfur compounds ===
==== MeSH D02.886.030 – amino acids, sulfur ====
- MeSH D02.886.030.175 – cystathionine
- MeSH D02.886.030.215 – cysteic acid
- MeSH D02.886.030.230 – cysteine
- MeSH D02.886.030.230.259 – acetylcysteine
- MeSH D02.886.030.230.310 – carbocysteine
- MeSH D02.886.030.230.330 – cysteinyldopa
- MeSH D02.886.030.230.369 – cystine
- MeSH D02.886.030.230.700 – selenocysteine
- MeSH D02.886.030.388 – ethionine
- MeSH D02.886.030.498 – homocysteine
- MeSH D02.886.030.498.050 – s-adenosylhomocysteine
- MeSH D02.886.030.554 – homocystine
- MeSH D02.886.030.676 – methionine
- MeSH D02.886.030.676.180 – s-adenosylmethionine
- MeSH D02.886.030.676.450 – n-formylmethionine
- MeSH D02.886.030.676.450.440 – n-formylmethionine leucyl-phenylalanine
- MeSH D02.886.030.676.620 – methionine sulfoximine
- MeSH D02.886.030.676.620.125 – buthionine sulfoximine
- MeSH D02.886.030.676.900 – selenomethionine
- MeSH D02.886.030.676.950 – vitamin u
- MeSH D02.886.030.786 – penicillamine
- MeSH D02.886.030.786.500 – s-nitroso-n-acetylpenicillamine
- MeSH D02.886.030.800 – thiopronine
- MeSH D02.886.030.893 – thiorphan

==== MeSH D02.886.092 – benzothiepins ====
- MeSH D02.886.092.408 – endosulfan

==== MeSH D02.886.250 – isothiocyanates ====
- MeSH D02.886.250.050 – 4-acetamido-4'-isothiocyanatostilbene-2,2'-disulfonic acid
- MeSH D02.886.250.125 – 4,4'-diisothiocyanostilbene-2,2'-disulfonic acid
- MeSH D02.886.250.250 – fluorescein-5-isothiocyanate
- MeSH D02.886.250.625 – 1-naphthylisothiocyanate

==== MeSH D02.886.309 – organothiophosphorus compounds ====
- MeSH D02.886.309.060 – amifostine
- MeSH D02.886.309.094 – azinphosmethyl
- MeSH D02.886.309.170 – chlorpyrifos
- MeSH D02.886.309.199 – coumaphos
- MeSH D02.886.309.208 – cystaphos
- MeSH D02.886.309.220 – diazinon
- MeSH D02.886.309.245 – dimethoate
- MeSH D02.886.309.270 – disulfoton
- MeSH D02.886.309.341 – echothiophate iodide
- MeSH D02.886.309.456 – fenitrothion
- MeSH D02.886.309.460 – fenthion
- MeSH D02.886.309.464 – fonofos
- MeSH D02.886.309.500 – leptophos
- MeSH D02.886.309.639 – malathion
- MeSH D02.886.309.746 – parathion
- MeSH D02.886.309.746.500 – methyl parathion
- MeSH D02.886.309.750 – phenylphosphonothioic acid, 2-ethyl 2-(4-nitrophenyl) ester
- MeSH D02.886.309.783 – phorate
- MeSH D02.886.309.790 – phosmet
- MeSH D02.886.309.900 – temefos
- MeSH D02.886.309.926 – thiophosphoric acid esters
- MeSH D02.886.309.950 – thiotepa

==== MeSH D02.886.369 – phenothiazines ====
- MeSH D02.886.369.029 – acepromazine
- MeSH D02.886.369.080 – azure stains
- MeSH D02.886.369.198 – chlorpromazine
- MeSH D02.886.369.326 – fluphenazine
- MeSH D02.886.369.470 – mesoridazine
- MeSH D02.886.369.513 – methotrimeprazine
- MeSH D02.886.369.517 – methylene blue
- MeSH D02.886.369.533 – moricizine
- MeSH D02.886.369.550 – nonachlazine
- MeSH D02.886.369.575 – perazine
- MeSH D02.886.369.593 – perphenazine
- MeSH D02.886.369.639 – prochlorperazine
- MeSH D02.886.369.661 – promazine
- MeSH D02.886.369.670 – promethazine
- MeSH D02.886.369.780 – thiethylperazine
- MeSH D02.886.369.843 – thioridazine
- MeSH D02.886.369.869 – tolonium chloride
- MeSH D02.886.369.898 – trifluoperazine
- MeSH D02.886.369.918 – triflupromazine
- MeSH D02.886.369.939 – trimeprazine

==== MeSH D02.886.489 – sulfhydryl compounds ====
- MeSH D02.886.489.155 – cysteine
- MeSH D02.886.489.180 – dimercaprol
- MeSH D02.886.489.180.900 – unithiol
- MeSH D02.886.489.225 – ergothioneine
- MeSH D02.886.489.409 – mercaptoethanol
- MeSH D02.886.489.472 – mercaptoethylamines
- MeSH D02.886.489.472.369 – cysteamine
- MeSH D02.886.489.520 – 3-mercaptopropionic acid
- MeSH D02.886.489.534 – 6-mercaptopurine
- MeSH D02.886.489.590 – mesna
- MeSH D02.886.489.600 – methimazole
- MeSH D02.886.489.700 – pantetheine
- MeSH D02.886.489.725 – s-nitrosothiols
- MeSH D02.886.489.725.500 – s-nitroso-n-acetylpenicillamine
- MeSH D02.886.489.725.750 – s-nitrosoglutathione
- MeSH D02.886.489.750 – succimer
- MeSH D02.886.489.750.725 – technetium tc 99m dimercaptosuccinic acid
- MeSH D02.886.489.828 – thioglycolates
- MeSH D02.886.489.891 – thiomalates
- MeSH D02.886.489.891.451 – gold sodium thiomalate

==== MeSH D02.886.520 – sulfides ====
- MeSH D02.886.520.150 – disulfides
- MeSH D02.886.520.150.087 – cystine
- MeSH D02.886.520.150.175 – disulfiram

==== MeSH D02.886.590 – sulfones ====
- MeSH D02.886.590.192 – dansyl compounds
- MeSH D02.886.590.263 – dapsone
- MeSH D02.886.590.263.050 – acedapsone
- MeSH D02.886.590.625 – phenylmethylsulfonyl fluoride
- MeSH D02.886.590.700 – sulfonamides
- MeSH D02.886.590.700.120 – benzolamide
- MeSH D02.886.590.700.135 – benzothiadiazines
- MeSH D02.886.590.700.135.138 – bendroflumethiazide
- MeSH D02.886.590.700.135.261 – chlorothiazide
- MeSH D02.886.590.700.135.261.476 – hydrochlorothiazide
- MeSH D02.886.590.700.135.261.476.716 – trichlormethiazide
- MeSH D02.886.590.700.135.285 – cyclopenthiazide
- MeSH D02.886.590.700.135.300 – diazoxide
- MeSH D02.886.590.700.135.475 – hydroflumethiazide
- MeSH D02.886.590.700.135.620 – methyclothiazide
- MeSH D02.886.590.700.135.781 – polythiazide
- MeSH D02.886.590.700.150 – bumetanide
- MeSH D02.886.590.700.344 – chloramines
- MeSH D02.886.590.700.365 – chlorthalidone
- MeSH D02.886.590.700.390 – clopamide
- MeSH D02.886.590.700.410 – dichlorphenamide
- MeSH D02.886.590.700.420 – ethoxzolamide
- MeSH D02.886.590.700.540 – indapamide
- MeSH D02.886.590.700.545 – 1-(5-isoquinolinesulfonyl)-2-methylpiperazine
- MeSH D02.886.590.700.570 – mafenide
- MeSH D02.886.590.700.575 – mefruside
- MeSH D02.886.590.700.600 – metolazone
- MeSH D02.886.590.700.625 – probenecid
- MeSH D02.886.590.700.725 – sulfanilamides
- MeSH D02.886.590.700.725.300 – furosemide
- MeSH D02.886.590.700.725.650 – sulfacetamide
- MeSH D02.886.590.700.725.700 – sulfachlorpyridazine
- MeSH D02.886.590.700.725.755 – sulfadiazine
- MeSH D02.886.590.700.725.755.800 – silver sulfadiazine
- MeSH D02.886.590.700.725.760 – sulfadimethoxine
- MeSH D02.886.590.700.725.765 – sulfadoxine
- MeSH D02.886.590.700.725.810 – sulfaguanidine
- MeSH D02.886.590.700.725.850 – sulfalene
- MeSH D02.886.590.700.725.853 – sulfamerazine
- MeSH D02.886.590.700.725.857 – sulfameter
- MeSH D02.886.590.700.725.862 – sulfamethazine
- MeSH D02.886.590.700.725.867 – sulfamethoxazole
- MeSH D02.886.590.700.725.867.500 – trimethoprim-sulfamethoxazole combination
- MeSH D02.886.590.700.725.872 – sulfamethoxypyridazine
- MeSH D02.886.590.700.725.877 – sulfamonomethoxine
- MeSH D02.886.590.700.725.882 – sulfamoxole
- MeSH D02.886.590.700.725.887 – sulfaphenazole
- MeSH D02.886.590.700.725.900 – sulfapyridine
- MeSH D02.886.590.700.725.925 – sulfaquinoxaline
- MeSH D02.886.590.700.725.935 – sulfathiazoles
- MeSH D02.886.590.700.725.935.813 – sulfamethizole
- MeSH D02.886.590.700.725.940 – sulfisomidine
- MeSH D02.886.590.700.725.945 – sulfisoxazole
- MeSH D02.886.590.700.730 – sulfasalazine
- MeSH D02.886.590.700.750 – sumatriptan
- MeSH D02.886.590.700.975 – xipamide
- MeSH D02.886.590.795 – sulfonylurea compounds
- MeSH D02.886.590.795.071 – acetohexamide
- MeSH D02.886.590.795.204 – carbutamide
- MeSH D02.886.590.795.283 – chlorpropamide
- MeSH D02.886.590.795.475 – gliclazide
- MeSH D02.886.590.795.500 – glipizide
- MeSH D02.886.590.795.575 – glyburide
- MeSH D02.886.590.795.834 – tolazamide
- MeSH D02.886.590.795.896 – tolbutamide
- MeSH D02.886.590.887 – tosyl compounds
- MeSH D02.886.590.887.140 – bromcresol green
- MeSH D02.886.590.887.150 – bromcresol purple
- MeSH D02.886.590.887.180 – bromphenol blue
- MeSH D02.886.590.887.200 – bromthymol blue
- MeSH D02.886.590.887.570 – tosylarginine methyl ester
- MeSH D02.886.590.887.600 – tosyllysine chloromethyl ketone
- MeSH D02.886.590.887.660 – tosylphenylalanyl chloromethyl ketone

==== MeSH D02.886.640 – sulfoxides ====
- MeSH D02.886.640.150 – dimethyl sulfoxide
- MeSH D02.886.640.575 – omeprazole

==== MeSH D02.886.645 – sulfur acids ====
- MeSH D02.886.645.575 – sulfenic acids
- MeSH D02.886.645.585 – sulfinic acids
- MeSH D02.886.645.600 – sulfonic acids
- MeSH D02.886.645.600.055 – alkanesulfonic acids
- MeSH D02.886.645.600.055.050 – alkanesulfonates
- MeSH D02.886.645.600.055.050.500 – mesna
- MeSH D02.886.645.600.055.050.510 – mesylates
- MeSH D02.886.645.600.055.050.510.100 – busulfan
- MeSH D02.886.645.600.055.050.510.300 – ethyl methanesulfonate
- MeSH D02.886.645.600.055.050.510.500 – methyl methanesulfonate
- MeSH D02.886.645.600.055.050.632 – sodium dodecyl sulfate
- MeSH D02.886.645.600.055.050.755 – sodium tetradecyl sulfate
- MeSH D02.886.645.600.055.250 – hepes
- MeSH D02.886.645.600.055.300 – isethionic acid
- MeSH D02.886.645.600.055.850 – taurine
- MeSH D02.886.645.600.055.850.800 – taurocholic acid
- MeSH D02.886.645.600.055.850.800.900 – taurodeoxycholic acid
- MeSH D02.886.645.600.055.850.800.900.875 – taurochenodeoxycholic acid
- MeSH D02.886.645.600.055.850.800.925 – taurolithocholic acid
- MeSH D02.886.645.600.080 – arylsulfonic acids
- MeSH D02.886.645.600.080.050 – arylsulfonates
- MeSH D02.886.645.600.080.050.100 – benzenesulfonates
- MeSH D02.886.645.600.080.050.100.075 – calcium dobesilate
- MeSH D02.886.645.600.080.050.100.100 – 4-chloromercuribenzenesulfonate
- MeSH D02.886.645.600.080.050.100.300 – ethamsylate
- MeSH D02.886.645.600.080.050.100.325 – ferrozine
- MeSH D02.886.645.600.080.050.100.600 – polyanetholesulfonate
- MeSH D02.886.645.600.080.050.100.900 – tiron
- MeSH D02.886.645.600.080.050.550 – lissamine green dyes
- MeSH D02.886.645.600.080.050.650 – naphthalenesulfonates
- MeSH D02.886.645.600.080.050.650.012 – amaranth dye
- MeSH D02.886.645.600.080.050.650.025 – amido black
- MeSH D02.886.645.600.080.050.650.050 – anilino naphthalenesulfonates
- MeSH D02.886.645.600.080.050.650.250 – congo red
- MeSH D02.886.645.600.080.050.650.300 – Evans blue
- MeSH D02.886.645.600.080.050.650.750 – suramin
- MeSH D02.886.645.600.080.050.650.875 – trypan blue
- MeSH D02.886.645.600.080.850 – sulfanilic acids
- MeSH D02.886.645.600.080.900 – trinitrobenzenesulfonic acid
- MeSH D02.886.645.600.925 – thiosulfonic acids
- MeSH D02.886.645.655 – sulfuric acids
- MeSH D02.886.645.655.424 – pentosan sulfuric polyester
- MeSH D02.886.645.655.850 – sulfuric acid esters

==== MeSH D02.886.655 – thiazides ====
- MeSH D02.886.655.500 – benzothiadiazines
- MeSH D02.886.655.500.138 – bendroflumethiazide
- MeSH D02.886.655.500.261 – chlorothiazide
- MeSH D02.886.655.500.261.476 – hydrochlorothiazide
- MeSH D02.886.655.500.261.476.716 – trichlormethiazide
- MeSH D02.886.655.500.285 – cyclopenthiazide
- MeSH D02.886.655.500.300 – diazoxide
- MeSH D02.886.655.500.475 – hydroflumethiazide
- MeSH D02.886.655.500.620 – methyclothiazide
- MeSH D02.886.655.500.781 – polythiazide

==== MeSH D02.886.665 – thiazines ====
- MeSH D02.886.665.150 – chlormezanone
- MeSH D02.886.665.400 – nifurtimox
- MeSH D02.886.665.500 – piroxicam
- MeSH D02.886.665.785 – thiadiazines
- MeSH D02.886.665.985 – xylazine

==== MeSH D02.886.675 – thiazoles ====
- MeSH D02.886.675.180 – chlormethiazole
- MeSH D02.886.675.188 – dithiazanine
- MeSH D02.886.675.197 – ethoxzolamide
- MeSH D02.886.675.215 – famotidine
- MeSH D02.886.675.250 – fanft
- MeSH D02.886.675.298 – firefly luciferin
- MeSH D02.886.675.346 – levamisole
- MeSH D02.886.675.482 – niridazole
- MeSH D02.886.675.500 – nizatidine
- MeSH D02.886.675.540 – oxythiamine
- MeSH D02.886.675.649 – rhodanine
- MeSH D02.886.675.651 – riluzole
- MeSH D02.886.675.653 – ritonavir
- MeSH D02.886.675.687 – saccharin
- MeSH D02.886.675.725 – sulfathiazoles
- MeSH D02.886.675.782 – tetramisole
- MeSH D02.886.675.840 – thiabendazole
- MeSH D02.886.675.867 – thiadiazoles
- MeSH D02.886.675.867.060 – acetazolamide
- MeSH D02.886.675.867.120 – benzolamide
- MeSH D02.886.675.867.537 – methazolamide
- MeSH D02.886.675.867.768 – timolol
- MeSH D02.886.675.900 – thiamine
- MeSH D02.886.675.900.300 – fursultiamin
- MeSH D02.886.675.900.600 – thiamine monophosphate
- MeSH D02.886.675.900.702 – thiamine pyrophosphate
- MeSH D02.886.675.900.900 – thiamine triphosphate
- MeSH D02.886.675.933 – thiazolidinediones

==== MeSH D02.886.680 – thiepins ====
- MeSH D02.886.680.350 – dibenzothiepins
- MeSH D02.886.680.350.250 – dothiepin
- MeSH D02.886.680.350.520 – methiothepin
- MeSH D02.886.680.702 – thiazepines
- MeSH D02.886.680.702.500 – dibenzothiazepines

==== MeSH D02.886.685 – thioamides ====
- MeSH D02.886.685.800 – thioacetamide

==== MeSH D02.886.706 – thiocarbamates ====
- MeSH D02.886.706.175 – dimethyldithiocarbamate
- MeSH D02.886.706.175.900 – thiram
- MeSH D02.886.706.175.950 – ziram
- MeSH D02.886.706.200 – ditiocarb
- MeSH D02.886.706.200.200 – disulfiram
- MeSH D02.886.706.250 – ethylenebis(dithiocarbamates)
- MeSH D02.886.706.250.500 – maneb
- MeSH D02.886.706.250.950 – zineb
- MeSH D02.886.706.537 – methomyl
- MeSH D02.886.706.825 – tolnaftate
- MeSH D02.886.706.850 – triallate

==== MeSH D02.886.740 – thioglycosides ====
- MeSH D02.886.740.149 – dithioerythritol
- MeSH D02.886.740.224 – dithiothreitol
- MeSH D02.886.740.299 – sucralfate
- MeSH D02.886.740.600 – thiogalactosides
- MeSH D02.886.740.600.500 – isopropyl thiogalactoside
- MeSH D02.886.740.703 – thioglucosides
- MeSH D02.886.740.703.350 – glucosinolates

==== MeSH D02.886.759 – thionucleosides ====
- MeSH D02.886.759.800 – thioinosine
- MeSH D02.886.759.800.500 – methylthioinosine
- MeSH D02.886.759.829 – thiouridine

==== MeSH D02.886.765 – thionucleotides ====
- MeSH D02.886.765.380 – guanosine 5'-o-(3-thiotriphosphate)

==== MeSH D02.886.778 – thiophenes ====
- MeSH D02.886.778.150 – carticaine
- MeSH D02.886.778.370 – ketotifen
- MeSH D02.886.778.440 – morantel
- MeSH D02.886.778.580 – pizotyline
- MeSH D02.886.778.634 – pyrantel
- MeSH D02.886.778.634.600 – pyrantel pamoate
- MeSH D02.886.778.634.670 – pyrantel tartrate
- MeSH D02.886.778.820 – thenoyltrifluoroacetone
- MeSH D02.886.778.827 – thioctic acid
- MeSH D02.886.778.834 – ticlopidine
- MeSH D02.886.778.840 – ticrynafen
- MeSH D02.886.778.850 – tiletamine

==== MeSH D02.886.803 – thiosemicarbazones ====
- MeSH D02.886.803.450 – methisazone
- MeSH D02.886.803.702 – thioacetazone

==== MeSH D02.886.904 – thiourea ====
- MeSH D02.886.904.100 – beta-aminoethyl isothiourea
- MeSH D02.886.904.200 – burimamide
- MeSH D02.886.904.282 – dimaprit
- MeSH D02.886.904.365 – guanylthiourea
- MeSH D02.886.904.390 – isothiuronium
- MeSH D02.886.904.425 – methallibure
- MeSH D02.886.904.455 – metiamide
- MeSH D02.886.904.500 – noxythiolin
- MeSH D02.886.904.601 – phenylthiourea
- MeSH D02.886.904.601.600 – phenylthiazolylthiourea
- MeSH D02.886.904.601.900 – thiophanate

=== MeSH D02.925 – triazenes ===
==== MeSH D02.925.200 – dacarbazine ====
- MeSH D02.925.200.500 – temozolomide

=== MeSH D02.974 – volatile organic compounds ===
The list continues at List of MeSH codes (D03).
