= Tiron =

Tiron may refer to:

- Tiron (chemical), a chemical compound
- Thiron-Gardais, also called Tiron, a commune in northern France
