= Mustard compounds =

Mustard compounds can refer to:

- Sulfur mustard (mustard gas)
- Nitrogen mustard
