= Acetylthiocholine =

Names
- Preferred IUPAC name 2-(Acetylsulfanyl)-N,N,N-trimethylethan-1-aminium

Identifiers
CAS Number	4468-05-7
3D model (JSmol)	Interactive image
ChEMBL	ChEMBL1231076
ChemSpider	19348
PubChem CID	20544
UNII	4V9VG6MX6E
CompTox Dashboard (EPA)	DTXSID90196269
- InChI: InChI=1S/C7H16NOS/c1-7(9)10-6-5-8(2,3)4/h5-6H2,1-4H3/q+1 Key: GFFIJCYHQYHUHB-UHFFFAOYSA-N
- SMILES: CC(=O)SCC[N+](C)(C)C

Properties
Chemical formula	C_{7}H_{16}NOS^{+1}
Molar mass	162.27 g·mol^{−1}
- Except where otherwise noted, data are given for materials in their standard state (at 25 °C [77 °F], 100 kPa). Infobox references

Acetylthiocholine is an acetylcholine analog used in scientific research.
