= Glucosylceramide beta-1,4-galactosyltransferase =

Class of enzymes

Identifiers
- EC no.: 2.4.1.274

Databases
- BRENDA: enzyme data
- ExPASy: NiceZyme view
- KEGG: enzyme entry
- MetaCyc: metabolic pathway
- Rhea: reactions
- PDB structures: RCSB PDB PDBe PDBsum
Search
- PMC: articles
- PubMed: articles
- NCBI: proteins

Glucosylceramide beta-1,4-galactosyltransferase (EC 2.4.1.274, lactosylceramide synthase, uridine diphosphate-galactose:glucosyl ceramide beta 1-4 galactosyltransferase, UDP-Gal:glucosylceramide beta1->4galactosyltransferase, GalT-2, UDP-galactose:beta-D-glucosyl-(1<->1)-ceramide beta-1,4-galactosyltransferase) is an enzyme with systematic name UDP-alpha-D-galactose:beta-D-glucosyl-(1<->1)-ceramide 4-beta-D-galactosyltransferase. This enzyme catalyses the following chemical reaction

UDP-alpha-D-galactose + beta-D-glucosyl-(1<->1)-ceramide $\rightleftharpoons$ UDP + beta-D-galactosyl-(1->4)-beta-D-glucosyl-(1<->1)-ceramide

Involved in the synthesis of several different major classes of glycosphingolipids.
