= Diphosphoglyceric acid =

Diphosphoglyceric acid may refer to:

- 1,3-Diphosphoglyceric acid
- 2,3-Diphosphoglyceric acid
