= Venturicidin =

Group of chemical compounds

Venturicidins (also known as aabomycins) are a group of antifungal compounds. The first member of this class was isolated from Streptomyces bacteria in 1961. Additional members of this class were subsequently isolated and characterized. An antifungal substance "aabomycin A" was isolated from Streptomyces in 1969. However, in 1990 it was reported that aabomycin A is actually a 3:1 mixture of two related components, which were then named aabomycin A1 and aabomycin A2. The structures of these were shown to be identical with those of the previously characterized compounds venturicidin A and venturicidin B, respectively. A new analog, venturicidin C, was recently reported from a Streptomyces isolated from thermal vents associated with the Ruth Mullins coal fire in Kentucky.

Venturicidins are active against Pyricularia oryzae and Trichophyton species.

== Chemical structures ==
Venturicidin A
(aabomycin A1)

Venturicidin B
(aabomycin A2)
