= Hydroxydopamine =

Hydroxydopamine may refer to:

- 2-Hydroxydopamine
- 5-Hydroxydopamine
- 6-Hydroxydopamine (oxidopamine)

== See Also ==
- Trihydroxyphenethylamine
