= Mefruside =

Chemical compound

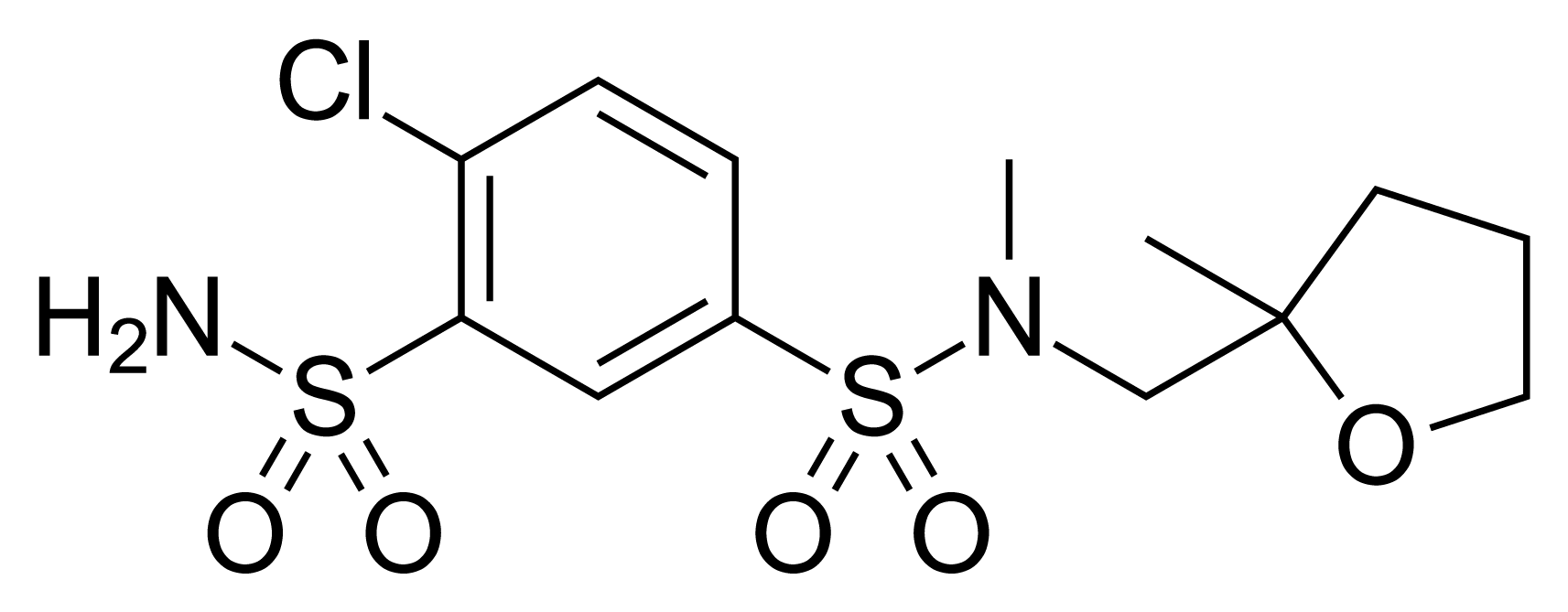

Clinical data
- AHFS/Drugs.com: International Drug Names
- Routes of administration: Oral
- ATC code: C03BA05 (WHO)

Legal status
- Legal status: In general: ℞ (Prescription only)

Identifiers
- IUPAC name: 4-chloro-N^{1}-methyl-N^{1}-[(2-methyltetrahydrofuran-2-yl)methyl]benzene-1,3-disulfonamide
- CAS Number: 7195-27-9
- PubChem CID: 4047
- ChemSpider: 3907
- UNII: X1NS9SNS92
- KEGG: D01877
- CompTox Dashboard (EPA): DTXSID0048844
- ECHA InfoCard: 100.027.785

Chemical and physical data
- Formula: C_{13}H_{19}ClN_{2}O_{5}S_{2}
- Molar mass: 382.87 g·mol^{−1}
- 3D model (JSmol): Interactive image
- SMILES: CC1(CCCO1)CN(C)S(=O)(=O)C2=CC(=C(C=C2)Cl)S(=O)(=O)N
- InChI: InChI=1S/C13H19ClN2O5S2/c1-13(6-3-7-21-13)9-16(2)23(19,20)10-4-5-11(14)12(8-10)22(15,17)18/h4-5,8H,3,6-7,9H2,1-2H3,(H2,15,17,18); Key:SMNOERSLNYGGOU-UHFFFAOYSA-N

Mefruside (INN) is a diuretic indicated for the treatment of edema and hypertension.

It was developed by Bayer A.G. and is sold under the tradename Baycaron.
