= Methylhistamine =

Methylhistamine may refer to:

- α-Methylhistamine
- 1-Methylhistamine (N^{τ}-methylhistamine)
- 4-Methylhistamine
