= Tiron (chemical) =

Names
- Preferred IUPAC name Disodium 4,5-dihydroxybenzene-1,3-disulfonate

Identifiers
CAS Number	149-45-1
3D model (JSmol)	Interactive image
ChemSpider	8651
ECHA InfoCard	100.005.220
EC Number	205-741-5
PubChem CID	5111182
UNII	4X87R5T106
CompTox Dashboard (EPA)	DTXSID7043950
- InChI: InChI=1S/C6H6O8S2.2Na/c7-4-1-3(15(9,10)11)2-5(6(4)8)16(12,13)14;;/h1-2,7-8H,(H,9,10,11)(H,12,13,14);;/q;2*+1/p-2 Key: ISWQCIVKKSOKNN-UHFFFAOYSA-L; InChI=1/C6H6O8S2.2Na/c7-4-1-3(15(9,10)11)2-5(6(4)8)16(12,13)14;;/h1-2,7-8H,(H,9,10,11)(H,12,13,14);;/q;2*+1/p-2 Key: ISWQCIVKKSOKNN-NUQVWONBAM
- SMILES: c1c(cc(c(c1O)O)S(=O)(=O)[O-])S(=O)(=O)[O-].[Na+].[Na+]

Properties
Chemical formula	C_{6}H_{4}Na_{2}O_{8}S_{2}
Molar mass	314.19 g·mol^{−1}
- Except where otherwise noted, data are given for materials in their standard state (at 25 °C [77 °F], 100 kPa). Infobox references

Tiron (trade name; systematic name disodium 4,5-dihydroxy-1,3-benzenedisulfonate) is a chemical compound used for its ability to form strong complexes with titanium and iron, as well as mixed compounds such as calcium titanium tiron.
