= List of MeSH codes (D01) =

The following is a partial list of the "D" codes for Medical Subject Headings (MeSH), as defined by the United States National Library of Medicine (NLM).

This list continues the information at List of MeSH codes (C23). Codes following these are found at List of MeSH codes (D02). For other MeSH codes, see List of MeSH codes.

The source for this content is the set of 2024 MeSH Trees from the NLM.

== MeSH D01 – inorganic chemicals ==
=== MeSH D01.029 – acids ===
==== MeSH D01.029.260 – acids, noncarboxylic ====
- MeSH D01.029.260.093 – boric acids
- MeSH D01.029.260.100 – borinic acids
- MeSH D01.029.260.110 – boronic acids
- MeSH D01.029.260.110.500 - bortezomib
- MeSH D01.029.260.150 – carbonic acid
- MeSH D01.029.260.300 – hydrobromic acid
- MeSH D01.029.260.326 – hydrochloric acid
- MeSH D01.029.260.328 – hydrofluoric acid
- MeSH D01.029.260.330 – hydrogen cyanide
- MeSH D01.029.260.340 – hydrogen sulfide
- MeSH D01.029.260.365 – hypochlorous acid
- MeSH D01.029.260.550 – nitric acid
- MeSH D01.029.260.575 – nitrous acid
- MeSH D01.029.260.650 – perchloric acid
- MeSH D01.029.260.675 – periodic acid
- MeSH D01.029.260.700 – phosphorus acids
- MeSH D01.029.260.700.600 – phosphinic acids
- MeSH D01.029.260.700.650 – phosphonic acids
- MeSH D01.029.260.700.675 – phosphoric acids
- MeSH D01.029.260.700.675.374 - phosphates
- MeSH D01.029.260.700.675.374.025 - acidulated phosphate fluoride
- MeSH D01.029.260.700.675.374.075 - calcium phosphates
- MeSH D01.029.260.700.675.374.075.025 - apatites
- MeSH D01.029.260.700.675.374.075.025.300 - hydroxyapatites
- MeSH D01.029.260.700.675.374.075.025.300.150 - durapatite
- MeSH D01.029.260.700.675.374.075.150 - calcium pyrophosphates
- MeSH D01.029.260.700.675.374.425 - phosphoramides
- MeSH D01.029.260.700.675.374.775 - polyphosphates
- MeSH D01.029.260.700.675.374.775.150 - diphosphates
- MeSH D01.029.260.700.675.374.775.150.900 - technetium tc 99m pyrophosphate
- MeSH D01.029.260.700.675.374.775.950 - tin polyphosphates
- MeSH D01.029.260.700.675.374.887 - struvite
- MeSH D01.029.260.700.675.750 – phosphotungstic acid
- MeSH D01.029.260.700.700 – phosphorous acids
- MeSH D01.029.260.863 – silicic acid
- MeSH D01.029.260.877 – sulfur acids
- MeSH D01.029.260.877.700 – sulfinic acids
- MeSH D01.029.260.877.740 – sulfonic acids
- MeSH D01.029.260.877.740.900 – thiosulfonic acids
- MeSH D01.029.260.877.800 – sulfuric acids
- MeSH D01.029.260.877.800.900 – tetrathionic acid

=== MeSH D01.045 – alkalies ===
==== MeSH D01.045.125 – carbonates ====
- MeSH D01.045.125.500 – lithium carbonate

==== MeSH D01.045.250 – hydroxides ====
- MeSH D01.045.250.050 – aluminum hydroxide
- MeSH D01.045.250.225 – ammonium hydroxide
- MeSH D01.045.250.313 – calcium hydroxide
- MeSH D01.045.250.357 – hydroxyl radical
- MeSH D01.045.250.400 – lye
- MeSH D01.045.250.575 – magnesium hydroxide
- MeSH D01.045.250.750 – sodium hydroxide
- MeSH D01.045.250.875 – water
- MeSH D01.045.250.875.200 – deuterium oxide
- MeSH D01.045.250.875.300 – drinking water
- MeSH D01.045.250.875.400 – ice
- MeSH D01.045.250.875.600 – mineral waters
- MeSH D01.045.250.875.600.500 – carbonated water
- MeSH D01.045.250.875.800 – steam

=== MeSH D01.056 – aluminum compounds ===
==== MeSH D01.056.050 – aluminum oxide ====
- MeSH D01.056.050.075 – aluminum silicates
- MeSH D01.056.050.075.100 – bentonite
- MeSH D01.056.050.075.225 – calcium aluminosilicate
- MeSH D01.056.050.075.350 – kaolin
- MeSH D01.056.050.075.975 – zeolites

=== MeSH D01.132 – boron compounds ===
==== MeSH D01.132.105 – boranes ====
- MeSH D01.132.105.050 – borohydrides

==== MeSH D01.132.250 – boric acids ====
- MeSH D01.132.250.075 – borates

==== MeSH D01.132.285 – boronic acids ====
- MeSH D01.132.285.500 – bortezomib

=== MeSH D01.139 – bromine compounds ===
==== MeSH D01.139.300 – hydrobromic acid ====
- MeSH D01.139.300.050 – bromides
- MeSH D01.139.300.050.100 – cyanogen bromide

=== MeSH D01.146 – calcium compounds ===
==== MeSH D01.146.275 – calcium carbonate ====
- MeSH D01.146.275.500 – nacre

==== MeSH D01.146.360 – calcium phosphates ====
- MeSH D01.146.360.050 – apatites
- MeSH D01.146.360.050.300 – hydroxyapatites
- MeSH D01.146.360.050.300.200 – durapatite
- MeSH D01.146.360.150 – calcium pyrophosphate

=== MeSH D01.200 – carbon compounds, inorganic ===
==== MeSH D01.200.200 – carbon dioxide ====
- MeSH D01.200.200.250 – dry ice

==== MeSH D01.200.275 – carbonic acid ====
- MeSH D01.200.275.150 – carbonates
- MeSH D01.200.275.150.100 – bicarbonates
- MeSH D01.200.275.150.100.800 – sodium bicarbonate
- MeSH D01.200.275.150.150 – calcium carbonate
- MeSH D01.200.275.150.150.500 – nacre
- MeSH D01.200.275.150.550 – lithium carbonate

=== MeSH D01.210 – chlorine compounds ===
==== MeSH D01.210.450 – hydrochloric acid ====
- MeSH D01.210.450.150 – chlorides
- MeSH D01.210.450.150.025 – aluminum chloride
- MeSH D01.210.450.150.050 – ammonium chloride
- MeSH D01.210.450.150.125 – cadmium chloride
- MeSH D01.210.450.150.150 – calcium chloride
- MeSH D01.210.450.150.450 – lithium chloride
- MeSH D01.210.450.150.500 – magnesium chloride
- MeSH D01.210.450.150.525 – mercuric chloride
- MeSH D01.210.450.150.750 – potassium chloride
- MeSH D01.210.450.150.875 – sodium chloride

==== MeSH D01.210.465 – hypochlorous acid ====
- MeSH D01.210.465.800 – sodium hypochlorite

=== MeSH D01.220 – chromium compounds ===
==== MeSH D01.220.150 – chromates ====
- MeSH D01.220.150.650 – potassium dichromate

==== MeSH D01.220.175 – chromium alloys ====
- MeSH D01.220.175.950 – vitallium

=== MeSH D01.248 – electrolytes ===
==== MeSH D01.248.497 – ions ====
- MeSH D01.248.497.158 – anions
- MeSH D01.248.497.158.050 – arsenates
- MeSH D01.248.497.158.055 – arsenites
- MeSH D01.248.497.158.076 – borates
- MeSH D01.248.497.158.100 – bromates
- MeSH D01.248.497.158.125 – bromides
- MeSH D01.248.497.158.165 – carbonates
- MeSH D01.248.497.158.165.100 – bicarbonates
- MeSH D01.248.497.158.190 – chlorates
- MeSH D01.248.497.158.215 – chlorides
- MeSH D01.248.497.158.235 – chromates
- MeSH D01.248.497.158.291 – cyanides
- MeSH D01.248.497.158.291.350 – ferricyanides
- MeSH D01.248.497.158.291.350.550 – nitroprusside
- MeSH D01.248.497.158.291.370 – ferrocyanides
- MeSH D01.248.497.158.380 – fluorides
- MeSH D01.248.497.158.459 – hydroxides
- MeSH D01.248.497.158.459.300 – hydroxyl radical
- MeSH D01.248.497.158.480 – iodates
- MeSH D01.248.497.158.490 – iodides
- MeSH D01.248.497.158.606 – nitrates
- MeSH D01.248.497.158.635 – nitrites
- MeSH D01.248.497.158.685 – oxides
- MeSH D01.248.497.158.685.750 – peroxides
- MeSH D01.248.497.158.685.750.424 – hydrogen peroxide
- MeSH D01.248.497.158.685.750.850 – superoxides
- MeSH D01.248.497.158.730 – phosphates
- MeSH D01.248.497.158.730.650 – polyphosphates
- MeSH D01.248.497.158.730.650.200 – diphosphates
- MeSH D01.248.497.158.750 – phosphites
- MeSH D01.248.497.158.845 – sulfates
- MeSH D01.248.497.158.845.703 – thiosulfates
- MeSH D01.248.497.158.874 – sulfides
- MeSH D01.248.497.158.874.390 – disulfides
- MeSH D01.248.497.158.874.390.369 – cystine
- MeSH D01.248.497.158.904 – sulfites
- MeSH D01.248.497.158.904.150 – dithionite
- MeSH D01.248.497.158.952 – vanadates
- MeSH D01.248.497.300 – cations
- MeSH D01.248.497.300.333 – cations, divalent
- MeSH D01.248.497.300.459 – cations, monovalent
- MeSH D01.248.497.300.459.700 – protons

=== MeSH D01.268 – elements ===
==== MeSH D01.268.033 – actinoid series elements ====
- MeSH D01.268.033.033 – actinium
- MeSH D01.268.033.050 – americium
- MeSH D01.268.033.100 – berkelium
- MeSH D01.268.033.150 – californium
- MeSH D01.268.033.175 – curium
- MeSH D01.268.033.250 – einsteinium
- MeSH D01.268.033.275 – fermium
- MeSH D01.268.033.500 – lawrencium
- MeSH D01.268.033.525 – mendelevium
- MeSH D01.268.033.550 – neptunium
- MeSH D01.268.033.575 – nobelium
- MeSH D01.268.033.700 – plutonium
- MeSH D01.268.033.725 – protactinium
- MeSH D01.268.033.900 – thorium
- MeSH D01.268.033.950 – uranium

==== MeSH D01.268.150 – carbon ====
- MeSH D01.268.150.038 – carbon fiber
- MeSH D01.268.150.150 – charcoal
- MeSH D01.268.150.200 – diamond
- MeSH D01.268.150.200.550 – nanodiamonds
- MeSH D01.268.150.250 – fullerenes
- MeSH D01.268.150.250.500 – nanotubes, carbon
- MeSH D01.268.150.300 – graphite

==== MeSH D01.268.185 – chalcogens ====
- MeSH D01.268.185.550 – oxygen
- MeSH D01.268.185.600 – polonium
- MeSH D01.268.185.850 – selenium
- MeSH D01.268.185.900 – sulfur
- MeSH D01.268.185.950 – tellurium

==== MeSH D01.268.271 – elements, radioactive ====
- MeSH D01.268.271.100 – actinoid series elements
- MeSH D01.268.271.100.033 – actinium
- MeSH D01.268.271.100.050 – americium
- MeSH D01.268.271.100.100 – berkelium
- MeSH D01.268.271.100.150 – californium
- MeSH D01.268.271.100.175 – curium
- MeSH D01.268.271.100.250 – einsteinium
- MeSH D01.268.271.100.275 – fermium
- MeSH D01.268.271.100.500 – lawrencium
- MeSH D01.268.271.100.525 – mendelevium
- MeSH D01.268.271.100.550 – neptunium
- MeSH D01.268.271.100.575 – nobelium
- MeSH D01.268.271.100.700 – plutonium
- MeSH D01.268.271.100.725 – protactinium
- MeSH D01.268.271.100.900 – thorium
- MeSH D01.268.271.100.950 – uranium
- MeSH D01.268.271.110 – astatine
- MeSH D01.268.271.245 – bismuth
- MeSH D01.268.271.380 – francium
- MeSH D01.268.271.680 – polonium
- MeSH D01.268.271.720 – promethium
- MeSH D01.268.271.770 – radium
- MeSH D01.268.271.800 – radon
- MeSH D01.268.271.800.800 – radon daughters
- MeSH D01.268.271.870 – technetium
- MeSH D01.268.271.935 – transactinide series elements

==== MeSH D01.268.380 – halogens ====
- MeSH D01.268.380.075 – astatine
- MeSH D01.268.380.112 – bromine
- MeSH D01.268.380.150 – chlorine
- MeSH D01.268.380.300 – fluorine
- MeSH D01.268.380.400 – iodine

==== MeSH D01.268.406 – hydrogen ====
- MeSH D01.268.406.500 – deuterium
- MeSH D01.268.406.500.250 – deuterium oxide
- MeSH D01.268.406.750 – protons
- MeSH D01.268.406.875 – tritium

==== MeSH D01.268.513 – metalloids ====
- MeSH D01.268.513.124 – antimony
- MeSH D01.268.513.249 – arsenic
- MeSH D01.268.513.500 – boron
- MeSH D01.268.513.750 – germanium
- MeSH D01.268.513.875 – polonium
- MeSH D01.268.513.937 – silicon
- MeSH D01.268.513.968 – tellurium

==== MeSH D01.268.549 – metals, alkali ====
- MeSH D01.268.549.125 – cesium
- MeSH D01.268.549.250 – francium
- MeSH D01.268.549.450 – lithium
- MeSH D01.268.549.550 – potassium
- MeSH D01.268.549.650 – rubidium
- MeSH D01.268.549.750 – sodium

==== MeSH D01.268.552 – metals, alkaline earth ====
- MeSH D01.268.552.050 – barium
- MeSH D01.268.552.075 – beryllium
- MeSH D01.268.552.100 – calcium
- MeSH D01.268.552.437 – magnesium
- MeSH D01.268.552.775 – radium
- MeSH D01.268.552.850 – strontium

==== MeSH D01.268.556 – metals, heavy ====
- MeSH D01.268.556.025 – actinium
- MeSH D01.268.556.037 – americium
- MeSH D01.268.556.050 – antimony
- MeSH D01.268.556.062 – barium
- MeSH D01.268.556.075 – berkelium
- MeSH D01.268.556.100 – bismuth
- MeSH D01.268.556.137 – cadmium
- MeSH D01.268.556.156 – californium
- MeSH D01.268.556.165 – cesium
- MeSH D01.268.556.175 – chromium
- MeSH D01.268.556.185 – cobalt
- MeSH D01.268.556.195 – copper
- MeSH D01.268.556.200 – curium
- MeSH D01.268.556.244 – einsteinium
- MeSH D01.268.556.266 – fermium
- MeSH D01.268.556.277 – francium
- MeSH D01.268.556.289 – gallium
- MeSH D01.268.556.305 – germanium
- MeSH D01.268.556.322 – gold
- MeSH D01.268.556.337 – hafnium
- MeSH D01.268.556.381 – indium
- MeSH D01.268.556.401 – iridium
- MeSH D01.268.556.412 – iron
- MeSH D01.268.556.423 – lawrencium
- MeSH D01.268.556.435 – lead
- MeSH D01.268.556.484 – manganese
- MeSH D01.268.556.494 – mendelevium
- MeSH D01.268.556.504 – mercury
- MeSH D01.268.556.555 – molybdenum
- MeSH D01.268.556.600 – neptunium
- MeSH D01.268.556.607 – nickel
- MeSH D01.268.556.615 – niobium
- MeSH D01.268.556.620 – nobelium
- MeSH D01.268.556.660 – osmium
- MeSH D01.268.556.680 – palladium
- MeSH D01.268.556.690 – platinum
- MeSH D01.268.556.700 – plutonium
- MeSH D01.268.556.750 – protactinium
- MeSH D01.268.556.775 – radium
- MeSH D01.268.556.787 – rhenium
- MeSH D01.268.556.793 – rhodium
- MeSH D01.268.556.800 – rubidium
- MeSH D01.268.556.805 – ruthenium
- MeSH D01.268.556.812 – silver
- MeSH D01.268.556.825 – strontium
- MeSH D01.268.556.837 – tantalum
- MeSH D01.268.556.843 – technetium
- MeSH D01.268.556.847 – thallium
- MeSH D01.268.556.850 – thorium
- MeSH D01.268.556.875 – tin
- MeSH D01.268.556.887 – tungsten
- MeSH D01.268.556.900 – uranium
- MeSH D01.268.556.920 – vanadium
- MeSH D01.268.556.940 – zinc
- MeSH D01.268.556.950 – zirconium

==== MeSH D01.268.557 – metals, light ====
- MeSH D01.268.557.050 – aluminum
- MeSH D01.268.557.080 – beryllium
- MeSH D01.268.557.290 – lithium
- MeSH D01.268.557.500 – magnesium
- MeSH D01.268.557.575 – potassium
- MeSH D01.268.557.650 – sodium
- MeSH D01.268.557.800 – titanium

==== MeSH D01.268.558 – metals, rare earth ====
- MeSH D01.268.558.362 – lanthanoid series elements
- MeSH D01.268.558.362.249 – cerium
- MeSH D01.268.558.362.374 – dysprosium
- MeSH D01.268.558.362.437 – erbium
- MeSH D01.268.558.362.468 – europium
- MeSH D01.268.558.362.484 – gadolinium
- MeSH D01.268.558.362.492 – holmium
- MeSH D01.268.558.362.500 – lanthanum
- MeSH D01.268.558.362.562 – lutetium
- MeSH D01.268.558.362.625 – neodymium
- MeSH D01.268.558.362.750 – praseodymium
- MeSH D01.268.558.362.875 – promethium
- MeSH D01.268.558.362.937 – samarium
- MeSH D01.268.558.362.968 – terbium
- MeSH D01.268.558.362.984 – thulium
- MeSH D01.268.558.362.992 – ytterbium
- MeSH D01.268.558.800 – scandium
- MeSH D01.268.558.975 – yttrium

==== MeSH D01.268.613 – noble gases ====
- MeSH D01.268.613.050 – argon
- MeSH D01.268.613.350 – helium
- MeSH D01.268.613.425 – krypton
- MeSH D01.268.613.600 – neon
- MeSH D01.268.613.700 – radon
- MeSH D01.268.613.900 – xenon

==== MeSH D01.268.956 – transition elements ====
- MeSH D01.268.956.061 – cadmium
- MeSH D01.268.956.124 – chromium
- MeSH D01.268.956.155 – cobalt
- MeSH D01.268.956.170 – copper
- MeSH D01.268.956.186 – gold
- MeSH D01.268.956.249 – hafnium
- MeSH D01.268.956.280 – iridium
- MeSH D01.268.956.287 – iron
- MeSH D01.268.956.295 – lawrencium
- MeSH D01.268.956.311 – lutetium
- MeSH D01.268.956.374 – manganese
- MeSH D01.268.956.437 – mercury
- MeSH D01.268.956.500 – molybdenum
- MeSH D01.268.956.625 – nickel
- MeSH D01.268.956.687 – niobium
- MeSH D01.268.956.702 – osmium
- MeSH D01.268.956.718 – palladium
- MeSH D01.268.956.734 – platinum
- MeSH D01.268.956.750 – rhenium
- MeSH D01.268.956.781 – rhodium
- MeSH D01.268.956.812 – ruthenium
- MeSH D01.268.956.827 – scandium
- MeSH D01.268.956.843 – silver
- MeSH D01.268.956.859 – tantalum
- MeSH D01.268.956.875 – technetium
- MeSH D01.268.956.878 – titanium
- MeSH D01.268.956.882 – tungsten
- MeSH D01.268.956.886 – vanadium
- MeSH D01.268.956.890 – yttrium
- MeSH D01.268.956.906 – zinc
- MeSH D01.268.956.937 – zirconium

=== MeSH D01.303 – fluorine compounds ===
==== MeSH D01.303.350 – hydrofluoric acid ====
- MeSH D01.303.350.300 – fluorides
- MeSH D01.303.350.300.150 – calcium fluoride
- MeSH D01.303.350.300.512 – fluorides, topical
- MeSH D01.303.350.300.875 – sodium fluoride
- MeSH D01.303.350.300.875.050 – acidulated phosphate fluoride
- MeSH D01.303.350.300.900 – sulfur hexafluoride
- MeSH D01.303.350.300.950 – tin fluorides

=== MeSH D01.339 – free radicals ===
==== MeSH D01.339.409 – reactive nitrogen species ====
- MeSH D01.339.409.500 – nitric oxide
- MeSH D01.339.409.750 – peroxynitrous acid

==== MeSH D01.339.431 – reactive oxygen species ====
- MeSH D01.339.431.125 – artemisinins
- MeSH D01.339.431.125.250 – artemether
- MeSH D01.339.431.125.250.500 – artemether, lumefantrine drug combination
- MeSH D01.339.431.125.500 – artesunate
- MeSH D01.339.431.249 – hydroxyl radical
- MeSH D01.339.431.311 – hypochlorous acid
- MeSH D01.339.431.374 – peroxides
- MeSH D01.339.431.374.318 – carbamide peroxide
- MeSH D01.339.431.374.424 – hydrogen peroxide
- MeSH D01.339.431.374.637 – lipid peroxides
- MeSH D01.339.431.374.744 – prostaglandin endoperoxides
- MeSH D01.339.431.374.850 – superoxides
- MeSH D01.339.431.374.925 – tert-butylhydroperoxide
- MeSH D01.339.431.374.962 – tetraoxanes
- MeSH D01.339.431.500 – singlet oxygen

=== MeSH D01.362 – gases ===
==== MeSH D01.362.635 – nitrogen oxides ====
- MeSH D01.362.635.600 – nitrogen dioxide
- MeSH D01.362.635.625 – nitrous oxide

==== MeSH D01.362.641 – noble gases ====
- MeSH D01.362.641.113 – argon
- MeSH D01.362.641.352 – helium
- MeSH D01.362.641.468 – krypton
- MeSH D01.362.641.592 – neon
- MeSH D01.362.641.745 – radon
- MeSH D01.362.641.745.800 – radon daughters
- MeSH D01.362.641.918 – xenon

==== MeSH D01.362.670 – oxygen ====
- MeSH D01.362.670.600 – ozone
- MeSH D01.362.670.600.500 – stratospheric ozone

=== MeSH D01.379 – gold compounds ===
==== MeSH D01.379.400 – gold colloid ====
- MeSH D01.379.400.350 – gold colloid, radioactive

=== MeSH D01.435 – hydrogen ===
==== MeSH D01.435.256 – deuterium ====
- MeSH D01.435.256.250 – deuterium oxide

=== MeSH D01.455 – hydroxides ===
==== MeSH D01.455.900 – water ====
- MeSH D01.455.900.200 – deuterium oxide

=== MeSH D01.475 – iodine compounds ===
==== MeSH D01.475.410 – iodides ====
- MeSH D01.475.410.700 – potassium iodide
- MeSH D01.475.410.800 – sodium iodide

==== MeSH D01.475.557 – iodophors ====
- MeSH D01.475.557.500 – povidone-iodide

=== MeSH D01.490 – iron compounds ===
==== MeSH D01.490.100 – ferric compounds ====
- MeSH D01.490.100.150 – ferric oxide, saccharated
- MeSH D01.490.100.300 – ferricyanides
- MeSH D01.490.100.300.550 – nitroprusside
- MeSH D01.490.100.375 – ferrosoferric oxide

==== MeSH D01.490.200 – ferrous compounds ====
- MeSH D01.490.200.250 – ferrocyanides

==== MeSH D01.490.800 – steel ====
- MeSH D01.490.800.900 – stainless steel

=== MeSH D01.496 – isotopes ===
==== MeSH D01.496.098 – calcium isotopes ====
- MeSH D01.496.098.325 – calcium radioisotopes

==== MeSH D01.496.123 – carbon isotopes ====
- MeSH D01.496.123.328 – carbon radioisotopes

==== MeSH D01.496.156 – cerium isotopes ====
- MeSH D01.496.156.300 – cerium radioisotopes

==== MeSH D01.496.180 – cesium isotopes ====
- MeSH D01.496.180.300 – cesium radioisotopes

==== MeSH D01.496.212 – chromium isotopes ====
- MeSH D01.496.212.349 – chromium radioisotopes

==== MeSH D01.496.239 – cobalt isotopes ====
- MeSH D01.496.239.354 – cobalt radioisotopes

==== MeSH D01.496.360 – gallium isotopes ====
- MeSH D01.496.360.400 – gallium radioisotopes

==== MeSH D01.496.381 – gold isotopes ====
- MeSH D01.496.381.550 – gold radioisotopes
- MeSH D01.496.381.550.400 – gold colloid, radioactive

==== MeSH D01.496.448 – iodine isotopes ====
- MeSH D01.496.448.496 – iodine radioisotopes
- MeSH D01.496.448.496.665 – serum albumin, radio-iodinated

==== MeSH D01.496.473 – iron isotopes ====
- MeSH D01.496.473.498 – iron radioisotopes

==== MeSH D01.496.532 – mercury isotopes ====
- MeSH D01.496.532.500 – mercury radioisotopes

==== MeSH D01.496.586 – nitrogen isotopes ====
- MeSH D01.496.586.520 – nitrogen radioisotopes

==== MeSH D01.496.625 – oxygen isotopes ====
- MeSH D01.496.625.600 – oxygen radioisotopes

==== MeSH D01.496.669 – phosphorus isotopes ====
- MeSH D01.496.669.604 – phosphorus radioisotopes

==== MeSH D01.496.705 – potassium isotopes ====
- MeSH D01.496.705.700 – potassium radioisotopes

==== MeSH D01.496.749 – radioisotopes ====
- MeSH D01.496.749.075 – barium radioisotopes
- MeSH D01.496.749.090 – bromine radioisotopes
- MeSH D01.496.749.108 – cadmium radioisotopes
- MeSH D01.496.749.113 – calcium radioisotopes
- MeSH D01.496.749.154 – carbon radioisotopes
- MeSH D01.496.749.185 – cerium radioisotopes
- MeSH D01.496.749.190 – cesium radioisotopes
- MeSH D01.496.749.213 – chromium radioisotopes
- MeSH D01.496.749.256 – cobalt radioisotopes
- MeSH D01.496.749.270 – copper radioisotopes
- MeSH D01.496.749.340 – fluorine radioisotopes
- MeSH D01.496.749.360 – gallium radioisotopes
- MeSH D01.496.749.410 – gold radioisotopes
- MeSH D01.496.749.410.400 – gold colloid, radioactive
- MeSH D01.496.749.460 – indium radioisotopes
- MeSH D01.496.749.474 – iodine radioisotopes
- MeSH D01.496.749.474.665 – serum albumin, radio-iodinated
- MeSH D01.496.749.500 – iridium radioisotopes
- MeSH D01.496.749.514 – iron radioisotopes
- MeSH D01.496.749.540 – krypton radioisotopes
- MeSH D01.496.749.560 – lead radioisotopes
- MeSH D01.496.749.590 – mercury radioisotopes
- MeSH D01.496.749.615 – nitrogen radioisotopes
- MeSH D01.496.749.635 – oxygen radioisotopes
- MeSH D01.496.749.658 – phosphorus radioisotopes
- MeSH D01.496.749.690 – potassium radioisotopes
- MeSH D01.496.749.731 – radioactive tracers
- MeSH D01.496.749.740 – rubidium radioisotopes
- MeSH D01.496.749.745 – ruthenium radioisotopes
- MeSH D01.496.749.780 – selenium radioisotopes
- MeSH D01.496.749.795 – sodium radioisotopes
- MeSH D01.496.749.815 – strontium radioisotopes
- MeSH D01.496.749.858 – sulfur radioisotopes
- MeSH D01.496.749.900 – thallium radioisotopes
- MeSH D01.496.749.910 – tin radioisotopes
- MeSH D01.496.749.925 – tritium
- MeSH D01.496.749.945 – xenon radioisotopes
- MeSH D01.496.749.960 – yttrium radioisotopes
- MeSH D01.496.749.980 – zinc radioisotopes

==== MeSH D01.496.807 – sodium isotopes ====
- MeSH D01.496.807.800 – sodium radioisotopes

==== MeSH D01.496.840 – strontium isotopes ====
- MeSH D01.496.840.685 – strontium radioisotopes

==== MeSH D01.496.868 – sulfur isotopes ====
- MeSH D01.496.868.690 – sulfur radioisotopes

==== MeSH D01.496.920 – xenon isotopes ====
- MeSH D01.496.920.700 – xenon radioisotopes

==== MeSH D01.496.943 – yttrium isotopes ====
- MeSH D01.496.943.800 – yttrium radioisotopes

==== MeSH D01.496.966 – zinc isotopes ====
- MeSH D01.496.966.800 – zinc radioisotopes

=== MeSH D01.524 – magnesium compounds ===
==== MeSH D01.524.500 – magnesium silicates ====
- MeSH D01.524.500.040 – asbestos, amosite
- MeSH D01.524.500.050 – asbestos, serpentine
- MeSH D01.524.500.850 – talc

=== MeSH D01.552 – metals ===
==== MeSH D01.552.020 – actinoid series elements ====
- MeSH D01.552.020.042 – actinium
- MeSH D01.552.020.086 – americium
- MeSH D01.552.020.150 – berkelium
- MeSH D01.552.020.200 – californium
- MeSH D01.552.020.272 – curium
- MeSH D01.552.020.337 – einsteinium
- MeSH D01.552.020.394 – fermium
- MeSH D01.552.020.507 – lawrencium
- MeSH D01.552.020.561 – mendelevium
- MeSH D01.552.020.621 – neptunium
- MeSH D01.552.020.659 – nobelium
- MeSH D01.552.020.734 – plutonium
- MeSH D01.552.020.778 – protactinium
- MeSH D01.552.020.889 – thorium
- MeSH D01.552.020.940 – uranium

==== MeSH D01.552.033 – alloys ====
- MeSH D01.552.033.182 – chromium alloys
- MeSH D01.552.033.182.900 – vitallium
- MeSH D01.552.033.533 – gold alloys
- MeSH D01.552.033.690 – metal ceramic alloys
- MeSH D01.552.033.690.250 – cermet cements
- MeSH D01.552.033.847 – steel
- MeSH D01.552.033.847.681 – stainless steel

==== MeSH D01.552.528 – metals, alkali ====
- MeSH D01.552.528.160 – cesium
- MeSH D01.552.528.328 – francium
- MeSH D01.552.528.480 – lithium
- MeSH D01.552.528.652 – potassium
- MeSH D01.552.528.759 – rubidium
- MeSH D01.552.528.850 – sodium

==== MeSH D01.552.539 – metals, alkaline earth ====
- MeSH D01.552.539.124 – barium
- MeSH D01.552.539.288 – calcium
- MeSH D01.552.539.745 – radium
- MeSH D01.552.539.861 – strontium

==== MeSH D01.552.544 – metals, heavy ====
- MeSH D01.552.544.025 – actinium
- MeSH D01.552.544.037 – americium
- MeSH D01.552.544.050 – antimony
- MeSH D01.552.544.062 – barium
- MeSH D01.552.544.075 – berkelium
- MeSH D01.552.544.100 – bismuth
- MeSH D01.552.544.137 – cadmium
- MeSH D01.552.544.156 – californium
- MeSH D01.552.544.165 – cesium
- MeSH D01.552.544.175 – chromium
- MeSH D01.552.544.185 – cobalt
- MeSH D01.552.544.195 – copper
- MeSH D01.552.544.200 – curium
- MeSH D01.552.544.244 – einsteinium
- MeSH D01.552.544.266 – fermium
- MeSH D01.552.544.277 – francium
- MeSH D01.552.544.289 – gallium
- MeSH D01.552.544.305 – germanium
- MeSH D01.552.544.322 – gold
- MeSH D01.552.544.337 – hafnium
- MeSH D01.552.544.381 – indium
- MeSH D01.552.544.401 – iridium
- MeSH D01.552.544.412 – iron
- MeSH D01.552.544.423 – lawrencium
- MeSH D01.552.544.435 – lead
- MeSH D01.552.544.484 – manganese
- MeSH D01.552.544.494 – mendelevium
- MeSH D01.552.544.504 – mercury
- MeSH D01.552.544.555 – molybdenum
- MeSH D01.552.544.600 – neptunium
- MeSH D01.552.544.607 – nickel
- MeSH D01.552.544.615 – niobium
- MeSH D01.552.544.620 – nobelium
- MeSH D01.552.544.660 – osmium
- MeSH D01.552.544.680 – palladium
- MeSH D01.552.544.690 – platinum
- MeSH D01.552.544.700 – plutonium
- MeSH D01.552.544.750 – protactinium
- MeSH D01.552.544.775 – radium
- MeSH D01.552.544.787 – rhenium
- MeSH D01.552.544.793 – rhodium
- MeSH D01.552.544.800 – rubidium
- MeSH D01.552.544.805 – ruthenium
- MeSH D01.552.544.812 – silver
- MeSH D01.552.544.825 – strontium
- MeSH D01.552.544.837 – tantalum
- MeSH D01.552.544.843 – technetium
- MeSH D01.552.544.847 – thallium
- MeSH D01.552.544.850 – thorium
- MeSH D01.552.544.875 – tin
- MeSH D01.552.544.887 – tungsten
- MeSH D01.552.544.900 – uranium
- MeSH D01.552.544.920 – vanadium
- MeSH D01.552.544.940 – zinc
- MeSH D01.552.544.950 – zirconium

==== MeSH D01.552.547 – metals, light ====
- MeSH D01.552.547.050 – aluminum
- MeSH D01.552.547.080 – beryllium
- MeSH D01.552.547.500 – magnesium
- MeSH D01.552.547.800 – titanium

==== MeSH D01.552.550 – metals, rare earth ====
- MeSH D01.552.550.399 – lanthanoid series elements
- MeSH D01.552.550.399.249 – cerium
- MeSH D01.552.550.399.374 – dysprosium
- MeSH D01.552.550.399.437 – erbium
- MeSH D01.552.550.399.468 – europium
- MeSH D01.552.550.399.484 – gadolinium
- MeSH D01.552.550.399.492 – holmium
- MeSH D01.552.550.399.500 – lanthanum
- MeSH D01.552.550.399.562 – lutetium
- MeSH D01.552.550.399.625 – neodymium
- MeSH D01.552.550.399.750 – praseodymium
- MeSH D01.552.550.399.875 – promethium
- MeSH D01.552.550.399.937 – samarium
- MeSH D01.552.550.399.968 – terbium
- MeSH D01.552.550.399.984 – thulium
- MeSH D01.552.550.399.992 – ytterbium
- MeSH D01.552.550.800 – scandium
- MeSH D01.552.550.975 – yttrium

=== MeSH D01.578 – minerals ===
==== MeSH D01.578.122 – apatites ====
- MeSH D01.578.122.477 – hydroxyapatites
- MeSH D01.578.122.477.300 – durapatite

==== MeSH D01.578.725 – silicates ====
- MeSH D01.578.725.025 – aluminum silicates
- MeSH D01.578.725.025.100 – bentonite
- MeSH D01.578.725.025.350 – kaolin
- MeSH D01.578.725.025.975 – zeolites
- MeSH D01.578.725.050 – asbestos
- MeSH D01.578.725.050.050 – asbestos, amphibole
- MeSH D01.578.725.050.050.050 – asbestos, amosite
- MeSH D01.578.725.050.050.100 – asbestos, crocidolite
- MeSH D01.578.725.050.075 – asbestos, serpentine
- MeSH D01.578.725.500 – magnesium silicates
- MeSH D01.578.725.500.040 – asbestos, amosite
- MeSH D01.578.725.500.050 – asbestos, serpentine
- MeSH D01.578.725.500.800 – talc

==== MeSH D01.578.750 – silicon dioxide ====
- MeSH D01.578.750.300 – diatomaceous earth
- MeSH D01.578.750.600 – quartz

=== MeSH D01.625 – nitrogen compounds ===
==== MeSH D01.625.062 – ammonium compounds ====
- MeSH D01.625.062.249 – ammonium chloride
- MeSH D01.625.062.374 – ammonium sulfate
- MeSH D01.625.062.437 – hydroxylamine
- MeSH D01.625.062.500 – quaternary ammonium compounds

==== MeSH D01.625.100 – azides ====
- MeSH D01.625.100.750 – sodium azide

==== MeSH D01.625.400 – hydrogen cyanide ====
- MeSH D01.625.400.100 – cyanides
- MeSH D01.625.400.100.150 – cyanamide
- MeSH D01.625.400.100.325 – ferricyanides
- MeSH D01.625.400.100.325.550 – nitroprusside
- MeSH D01.625.400.100.350 – ferrocyanides
- MeSH D01.625.400.100.750 – potassium cyanide
- MeSH D01.625.400.100.875 – sodium cyanide

==== MeSH D01.625.525 – nitric acid ====
- MeSH D01.625.525.550 – nitrates
- MeSH D01.625.525.550.850 – silver nitrate
- MeSH D01.625.525.550.950 – uranyl nitrate

==== MeSH D01.625.550 – nitrogen oxides ====
- MeSH D01.625.550.500 – nitric oxide
- MeSH D01.625.550.525 – nitrogen dioxide
- MeSH D01.625.550.550 – nitrous oxide

==== MeSH D01.625.600 – nitrous acid ====
- MeSH D01.625.600.600 – nitrites
- MeSH D01.625.600.600.800 – sodium nitrite
- MeSH D01.625.600.800 – peroxynitrous acid

==== MeSH D01.625.700 – reactive nitrogen species ====
- MeSH D01.625.700.500 – nitric oxide
- MeSH D01.625.700.750 – peroxynitrous acid

=== MeSH D01.650 – oxygen compounds ===
==== MeSH D01.650.550 – oxides ====
- MeSH D01.650.550.050 – aluminum oxide
- MeSH D01.650.550.050.075 – aluminum silicates
- MeSH D01.650.550.050.075.100 – bentonite
- MeSH D01.650.550.050.075.350 – kaolin
- MeSH D01.650.550.050.075.975 – zeolites
- MeSH D01.650.550.200 – carbon dioxide
- MeSH D01.650.550.200.250 – dry ice
- MeSH D01.650.550.250 – carbon monoxide
- MeSH D01.650.550.400 – hypochlorous acid
- MeSH D01.650.550.400.800 – sodium hypochlorite
- MeSH D01.650.550.575 – magnesium oxide
- MeSH D01.650.550.587 – nitrogen oxides
- MeSH D01.650.550.587.600 – nitric oxide
- MeSH D01.650.550.587.625 – nitrogen dioxide
- MeSH D01.650.550.587.650 – nitrous oxide
- MeSH D01.650.550.600 – osmium tetroxide
- MeSH D01.650.550.750 – peroxides
- MeSH D01.650.550.750.400 – hydrogen peroxide
- MeSH D01.650.550.750.800 – superoxides
- MeSH D01.650.550.825 – silicon dioxide
- MeSH D01.650.550.825.400 – diatomaceous earth
- MeSH D01.650.550.825.600 – quartz
- MeSH D01.650.550.850 – sulfur oxides
- MeSH D01.650.550.850.925 – sulfur dioxide
- MeSH D01.650.550.875 – thorium dioxide
- MeSH D01.650.550.925 – water
- MeSH D01.650.550.975 – zinc oxide

=== MeSH D01.695 – phosphorus compounds ===
==== MeSH D01.695.625 – phosphorus acids ====
- MeSH D01.695.625.600 – phosphinic acids
- MeSH D01.695.625.650 – phosphonic acids
- MeSH D01.695.625.675 – phosphoric acids
- MeSH D01.695.625.675.650 – phosphates
- MeSH D01.695.625.675.650.025 – acidulated phosphate fluoride
- MeSH D01.695.625.675.650.075 – calcium phosphates
- MeSH D01.695.625.675.650.075.025 – apatites
- MeSH D01.695.625.675.650.075.025.300 – hydroxyapatites
- MeSH D01.695.625.675.650.075.025.300.150 – durapatite
- MeSH D01.695.625.675.650.075.150 – calcium pyrophosphate
- MeSH D01.695.625.675.650.775 – polyphosphates
- MeSH D01.695.625.675.650.775.150 – diphosphates
- MeSH D01.695.625.675.650.775.150.150 – calcium pyrophosphate
- MeSH D01.695.625.675.650.775.150.900 – technetium tc 99m pyrophosphate
- MeSH D01.695.625.675.650.775.950 – tin polyphosphates
- MeSH D01.695.625.675.750 – phosphotungstic acid
- MeSH D01.695.625.700 – phosphorous acids
- MeSH D01.695.625.700.675 – phosphites

=== MeSH D01.810 – selenium compounds ===
==== MeSH D01.810.900 – selenious acid ====
- MeSH D01.810.900.500 – sodium selenite

=== MeSH D01.837 – silicon compounds ===
==== MeSH D01.837.725 – silicon dioxide ====
- MeSH D01.837.725.400 – diatomaceous earth
- MeSH D01.837.725.600 – quartz
- MeSH D01.837.725.700 – silicic acid
- MeSH D01.837.725.700.760 – silicates
- MeSH D01.837.725.700.760.050 – aluminum silicates
- MeSH D01.837.725.700.760.050.100 – bentonite
- MeSH D01.837.725.700.760.050.400 – kaolin
- MeSH D01.837.725.700.760.050.950 – zeolites
- MeSH D01.837.725.700.760.070 – asbestos
- MeSH D01.837.725.700.760.070.050 – asbestos, amphibole
- MeSH D01.837.725.700.760.070.050.060 – asbestos, amosite
- MeSH D01.837.725.700.760.070.050.090 – asbestos, crocidolite
- MeSH D01.837.725.700.760.070.110 – asbestos, serpentine
- MeSH D01.837.725.700.760.535 – magnesium silicates
- MeSH D01.837.725.700.760.535.040 – asbestos, amosite
- MeSH D01.837.725.700.760.535.400 – asbestos, serpentine
- MeSH D01.837.725.700.760.535.800 – talc

=== MeSH D01.857 – sodium compounds ===
==== MeSH D01.857.650 – sodium chloride ====
- MeSH D01.857.650.705 – sodium chloride, dietary

==== MeSH D01.857.700 – sodium, dietary ====
- MeSH D01.857.700.705 – sodium chloride, dietary

==== MeSH D01.857.725 – sodium fluoride ====
- MeSH D01.857.725.050 – acidulated phosphate fluoride

=== MeSH D01.875 – sulfur compounds ===
==== MeSH D01.875.350 – hydrogen sulfide ====
- MeSH D01.875.350.850 – sulfides
- MeSH D01.875.350.850.150 – disulfides
- MeSH D01.875.350.850.150.125 – carbon disulfide
- MeSH D01.875.350.850.150.369 – cystine

==== MeSH D01.875.750 – sulfites ====
- MeSH D01.875.750.200 – dithionite

==== MeSH D01.875.800 – sulfur acids ====
- MeSH D01.875.800.700 – sulfinic acids
- MeSH D01.875.800.740 – sulfonic acids
- MeSH D01.875.800.740.900 – thiosulfonic acids
- MeSH D01.875.800.800 – sulfuric acids
- MeSH D01.875.800.800.850 – sulfates
- MeSH D01.875.800.800.850.025 – alum compounds
- MeSH D01.875.800.800.850.050 – ammonium sulfate
- MeSH D01.875.800.800.850.075 – barium sulfate
- MeSH D01.875.800.800.850.125 – calcium sulfate
- MeSH D01.875.800.800.850.150 – copper sulfate
- MeSH D01.875.800.800.850.500 – magnesium sulfate
- MeSH D01.875.800.800.850.900 – thiosulfates
- MeSH D01.875.800.800.850.900.250 – gold sodium thiosulfate
- MeSH D01.875.800.800.850.950 – zinc sulfate
- MeSH D01.875.800.800.900 – tetrathionic acid

==== MeSH D01.875.825 – sulfur oxides ====
- MeSH D01.875.825.925 – sulfur dioxide

=== MeSH D01.975 – zinc compounds ===
==== MeSH D01.975.987 – zinc sulfate ====
The list continues at List of MeSH codes (D02).
