= Cytochrome c =

Protein found in humans

CYCS
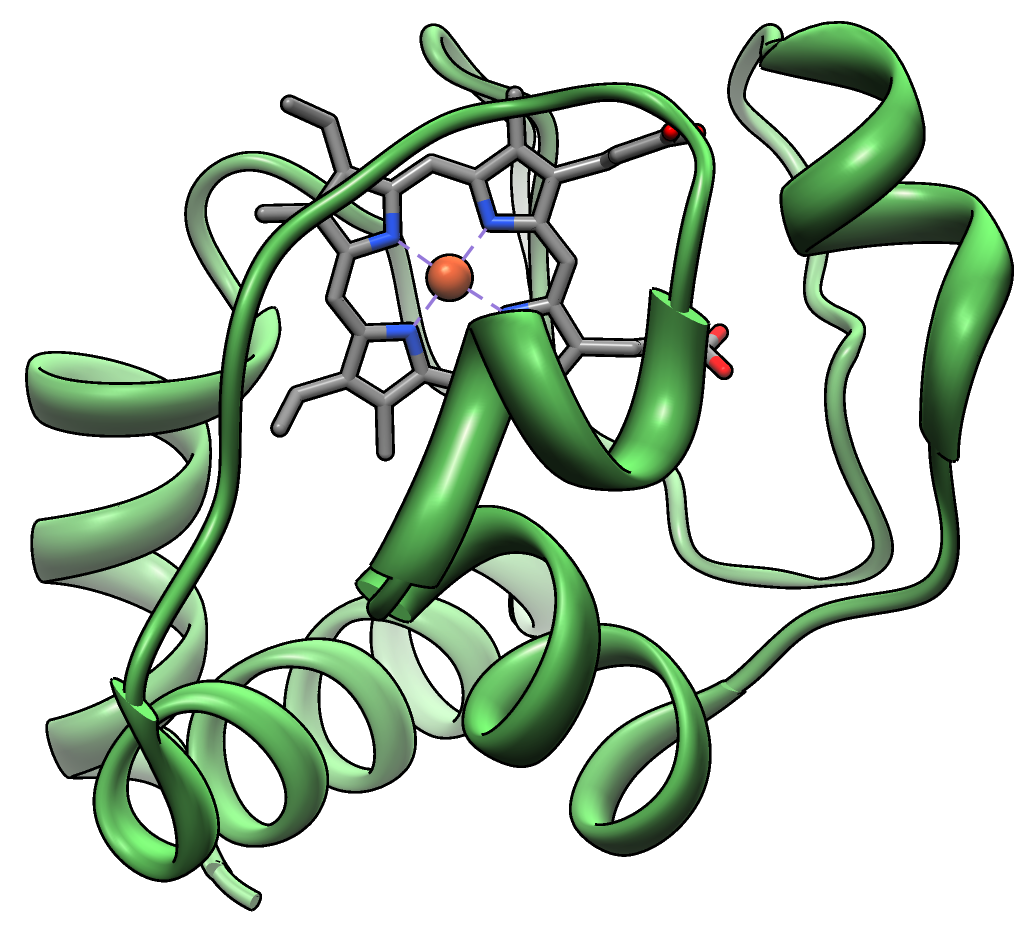

Identifiers
- Aliases: CYCS, CYC, HCS, THC4, cytochrome c, somatic, Cytochrome c, cyt c
- External IDs: OMIM: 123970; MGI: 88578; GeneCards: CYCS
Available structures
PDB	Ortholog search: PDBe RCSB
PDB	List of PDB id codes 1J3S, 3NWV, 3ZCF, 3ZOO, 2N9J, 2N9I

Gene location (Human)
Chr.	Chromosome 7 (human)
Band	7p15.3	Start	25,118,656 bp
Band	7p15.3	End	25,125,260 bp

Gene location (Mouse)
Chr.	Chromosome 6 (mouse)
Band	6 B2.3|6 24.32 cM	Start	50,539,543 bp
Band	6 B2.3|6 24.32 cM	End	50,543,518 bp
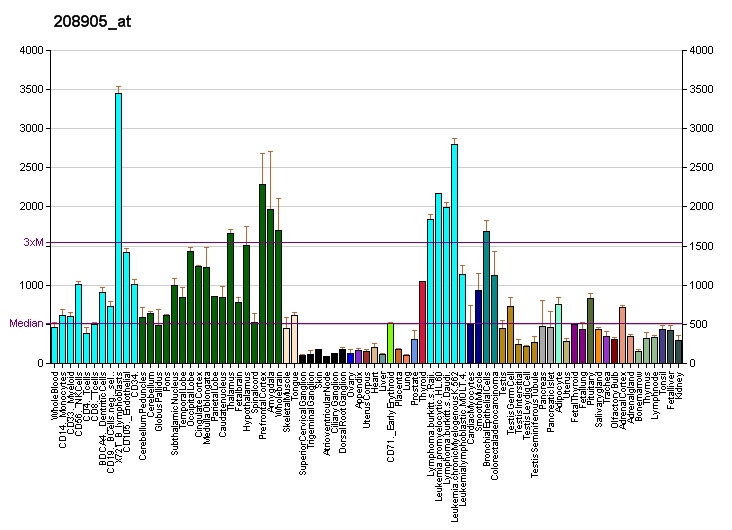
RNA expression pattern
Bgee	Human / Mouse (ortholog); Top expressed in: mucosa of transverse colon; rectum; right auricle of heart; muscle of thigh; gastrocnemius muscle; prefrontal cortex; apex of heart; epithelium of colon; gonad; left ventricle / Top expressed in: dentate gyrus of hippocampal formation granule cell; right kidney; embryo; muscle of thigh; esophagus; embryo; yolk sac; morula; superior frontal gyrus; tail of embryo; More reference expression data
BioGPS	More reference expression data
Gene ontology
Molecular function	protein serine/threonine phosphatase activity; metal ion binding; protein binding; heme binding; electron transfer activity
Cellular component	cytosol; protein phosphatase type 2A complex; mitochondrion; mitochondrial inner membrane; respirasome; nucleus; mitochondrial intermembrane space
Biological process	mitochondrion organization; intrinsic apoptotic signaling pathway; activation of cysteine-type endopeptidase activity involved in apoptotic process by cytochrome c; cellular respiration; protein dephosphorylation; mitochondrial electron transport, cytochrome c to oxygen; apoptotic process; mitochondrial electron transport, ubiquinol to cytochrome c; cellular response to oxidative stress
Sources:Amigo / QuickGO
Orthologs
Databases	NCBI: entry; OMA: entry
Species	Human	Mouse
Entrez	54205	13063
Ensembl	ENSG00000172115	ENSMUSG00000063694
UniProt	P99999	P62897
RefSeq (mRNA)	NM_018947	NM_007808
RefSeq (protein)	NP_061820	NP_031834
Location (UCSC)	Chr 7: 25.12 – 25.13 Mb	Chr 6: 50.54 – 50.54 Mb
PubMed search
- Wikidata
View/Edit Human	View/Edit Mouse

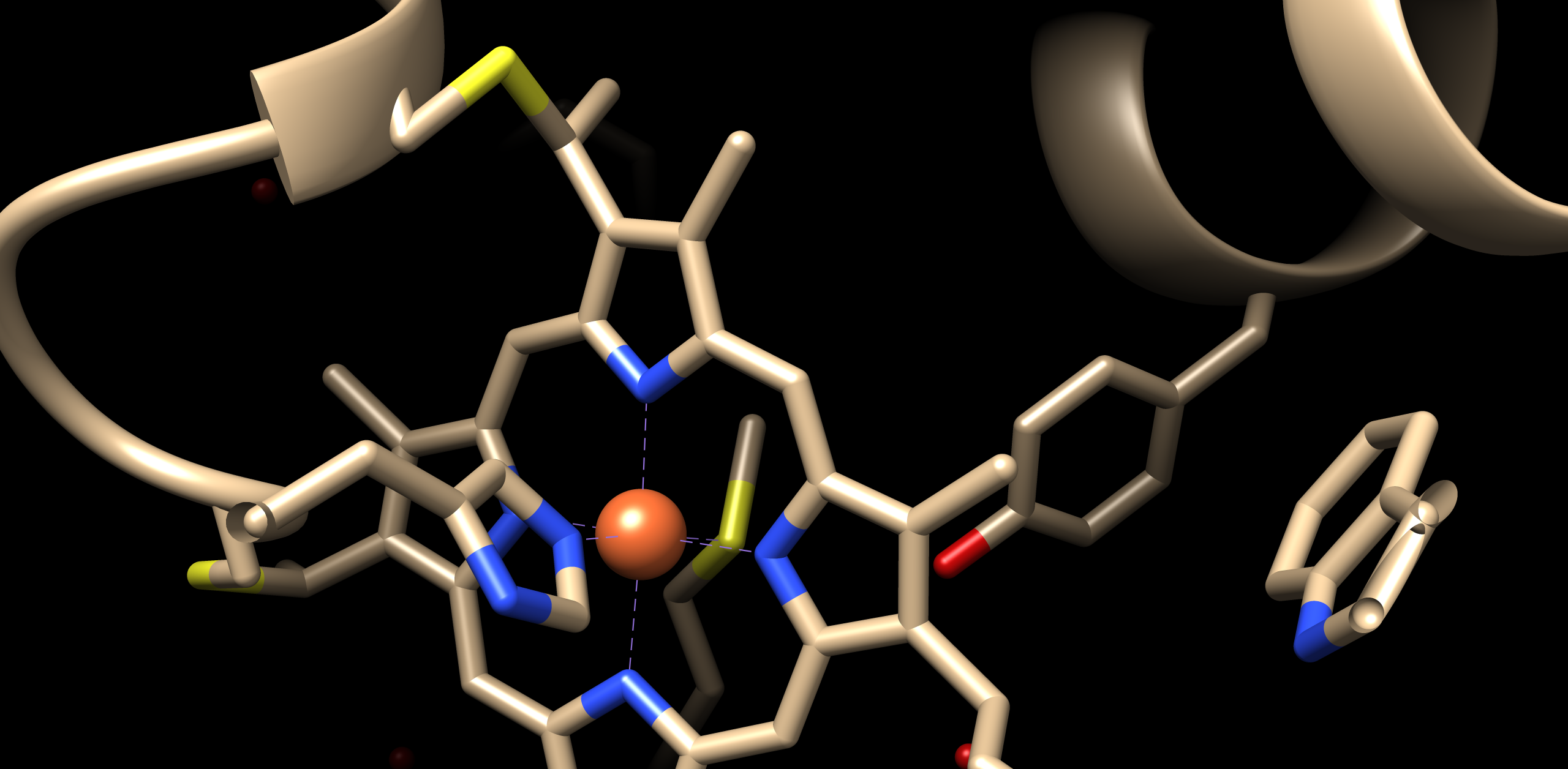
Heme prosthetic group of cytochrome c, consisting of a rigid porphyrin ring coordinated with an iron atom

The cytochrome complex, or cyt c, is a small hemeprotein found loosely associated with the inner membrane of the mitochondrion, where it plays a critical role in cellular respiration. It transfers electrons between Complexes III (Coenzyme Q – Cyt c reductase) and IV (Cyt c oxidase). Cytochrome c is highly water-soluble, unlike other cytochromes. It is capable of undergoing oxidation and reduction as its iron atom converts between the ferrous and ferric forms, but does not bind oxygen. It also plays a major role in cell apoptosis. In humans, cytochrome c is encoded by the CYCS gene.

== Phylogenetics of cytochrome c ==
Cytochrome c is a highly conserved protein across the spectrum of eukaryotic species, found in plants, animals, fungi, and many unicellular organisms. This, along with its small size (molecular weight about 12,000 daltons), makes it useful in studies of cladistics. Cytochrome c has been studied for the glimpse it gives into evolutionary biology.

Cytochrome c has a primary structure consisting of a chain of about 100 amino acids. Many higher-order organisms possess a chain of 104 amino acids. The sequence of cytochrome c in humans is identical to that of chimpanzees (our closest relatives), but differs from that of horses.

Cytochrome c has an amino acid sequence that is highly conserved in eukaryotes, varying by only a few residues. In more than thirty species tested in one study, 34 of the 104 amino acids were conserved (identical at their characteristic position). For example, human cytochrome oxidase reacted with wheat cytochrome c, in vitro; which held true for all pairs of species tested. In addition, the redox potential of +0.25 volts is the same in all cytochrome c molecules studied.

== Structure ==
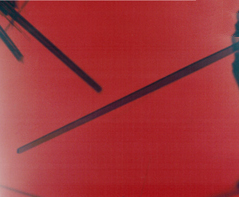
Tunafish cytochrome c crystals (~5 mm long) grown by liquid–liquid diffusion under microgravity conditions in outer space

Cytochrome c belongs to class I of the c-type cytochrome family and contains a characteristic CXXCH (cysteine-any-any-cysteine-histidine) amino acid motif that binds heme. This motif is located towards the N-terminus of the peptide chain and contains a histidine as the 5th ligand of the heme iron. The 6th ligand is provided by a methionine residue found towards the C-terminus. The protein backbone is folded into five α-helices that are numbered α1-α5 from N-terminus to C-terminus. Helices α3, α4 and α5 are referred to as 50s, 60s and 70s helices, respectively, when referring to mitochondrial cytochrome c.

=== Heme c ===
Structure of heme c

While most heme proteins are attached to the prosthetic group through iron ion ligation and tertiary interactions, the heme group of cytochrome c makes thioether bonds with two cysteine side chains of the protein. One of the main properties of heme c, which allows cytochrome c to have variety of functions, is its ability to have different reduction potentials in nature. This property determines the kinetics and thermodynamics of an electron transfer reaction.

=== Dipole moment ===
The dipole moment has an important role in orienting proteins to the proper directions and enhancing their abilities to bind to other molecules. The dipole moment of cytochrome c results from a cluster of negatively charged amino acid side chains at the "back" of the enzyme. Despite variations in the number of bound heme groups and variations in sequence, the dipole moment of vertebrate cytochromes c is remarkably conserved. For example, vertebrate cytochromes c all have a dipole moment of approximately 320 debye while cytochromes c of plants and insects have a dipole moment of approximately 340 debye.

== Function ==
=== Electron transport chain ===
Cytochrome c is an essential component of the respiratory electron transport chain in mitochondria. The heme group of cytochrome c accepts electrons from the bc_{1} Complex III and transports them to Complex IV, while it transfers energy in the opposite direction.

Cytochrome c can also catalyze several redox reactions such as hydroxylation and aromatic oxidation, and shows peroxidase activity by oxidation of various electron donors such as 2,2-azino-bis(3-ethylbenzthiazoline-6-sulfonic acid) (ABTS), 2-keto-4-thiomethyl butyric acid and 4-aminoantipyrine.

A bacterial cytochrome c functions as a nitrite reductase.

=== Role in apoptosis ===
Cytochrome c was also discovered in 1996 by Xiaodong Wang to have an intermediate role in apoptosis, a controlled form of cell death used to kill cells in the process of development or in response to infection or DNA damage.

Cytochrome c binds to cardiolipin in the inner mitochondrial membrane, thus anchoring its presence and keeping it from releasing out of the mitochondria and initiating apoptosis. While the initial attraction between cardiolipin and cytochrome c is electrostatic due to the extreme positive charge on cytochrome c, the final interaction is hydrophobic, where a hydrophobic tail from cardiolipin inserts itself into the hydrophobic portion of cytochrome c.

During the early phase of apoptosis, mitochondrial ROS production is stimulated, and cardiolipin is oxidized by a peroxidase function of the cardiolipin–cytochrome c complex. The hemoprotein is then detached from the mitochondrial inner membrane and can be extruded into the soluble cytoplasm through pores in the outer membrane.

The sustained elevation in calcium levels precedes cyt c release from the mitochondria. The release of small amounts of cyt c leads to an interaction with the IP3 receptor (IP3R) on the endoplasmic reticulum (ER), causing ER calcium release. The overall increase in calcium triggers a massive release of cyt c, which then acts in the positive feedback loop to maintain ER calcium release through the IP3Rs. This explains how the ER calcium release can reach cytotoxic levels. This release of cytochrome c in turn activates caspase 9, a cysteine protease. Caspase 9 can then go on to activate caspase 3 and caspase 7, which destroy the cell from within.

=== Inhibition of apoptosis ===
One of the ways cell apoptosis is activated is by release of cytochrome c from the mitochondria into cytosol. A study has shown that cells are able to protect themselves from apoptosis by blocking the release of cytochrome c using Bcl-x_{L}. Another way that cells can control apoptosis is by phosphorylation of Tyr48, which turns cytochrome c into an anti-apoptotic switch.

=== As an antioxidative enzyme ===
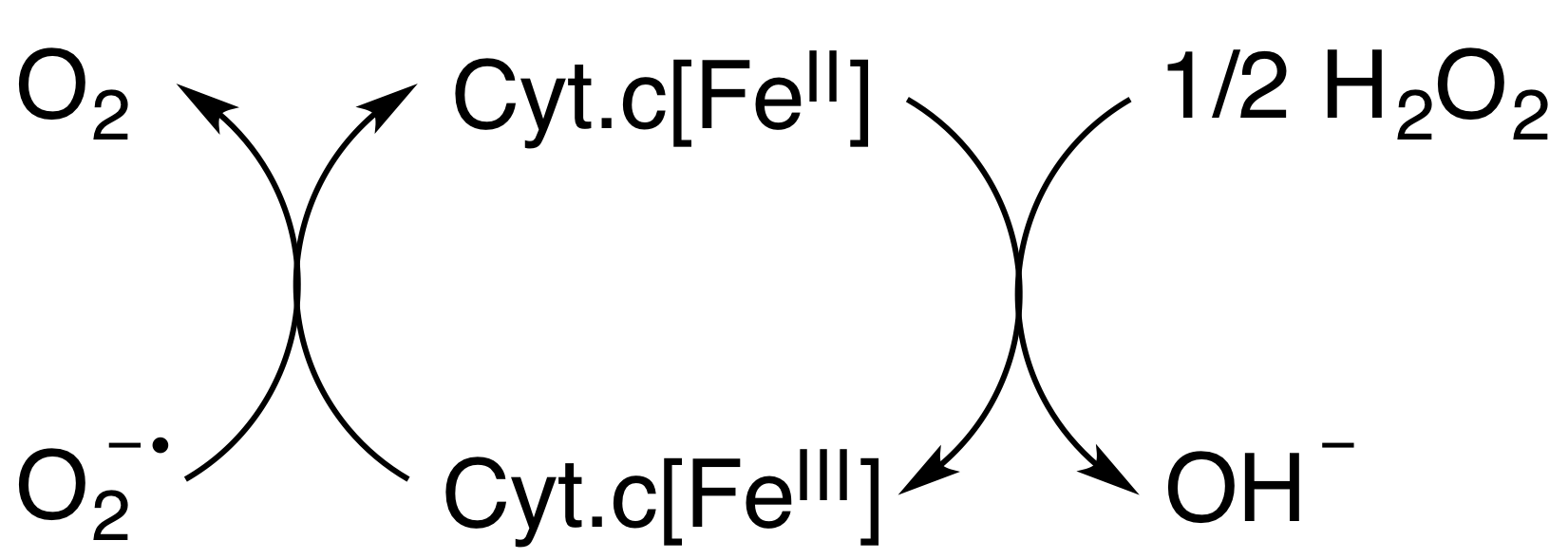
Removal of O^{−}_{2} and H_{2}O_{2} by cytochrome c

In addition to its well-known roles in the electron transport chain and cell apoptosis, according to a 2008 study cytochrome c can also act as an antioxidative enzyme in the mitochondria; it does so by removing superoxide (O^{−}_{2}) and hydrogen peroxide (H_{2}O_{2}) from mitochondria. Therefore, not only is cytochrome c required in the mitochondria for cellular respiration, but it is also needed in the mitochondria to limit the production of O^{−}_{2} and H_{2}O_{2}.

== Extramitochondrial localisation ==
Cytochrome c is widely believed to be localised solely in the mitochondrial intermembrane space under normal physiological conditions. The release of cytochrome c from mitochondria to the cytosol, where it activates the caspase family of proteases, is believed to be the primary trigger leading to the onset of apoptosis. Measuring the amount of cytochrome c leaking from mitochondria to cytosol, and out of the cell to culture medium, is a sensitive method to monitor the degree of apoptosis. However, detailed immuno-electronmicroscopic studies with rat tissues sections employing cytochrome c specific antibodies provide compelling evidence that cytochrome c under normal cellular conditions is also present at extramitochondrial locations. In pancreatic acinar cells and the anterior pituitary, strong and specific presence of cytochrome c was detected in zymogen granules and in growth hormone granules, respectively. In the pancreas, cytochrome c was also found in condensing vacuoles and in the acinar lumen. The extramitochondrial localisation of cytochrome c was shown to be specific as it was completely abolished upon adsorption of the primary antibody with purified cytochrome c. Besides cytochrome c, extramitochondrial localisation has also been observed for large numbers of other proteins including those encoded by mitochondrial DNA. This raises the possibility of the existence of yet-unidentified specific mechanisms for protein translocation from mitochondria to other cellular destinations.

== Applications ==
=== Superoxide detection ===
Peroxynitrous acid

Cytochrome c has been used to detect peroxide production in biological systems. As superoxide is produced, the number of oxidised cytochrome c^{3+} increases, and reduced cytochrome c^{2+} decreases. However, superoxide is often produced with nitric oxide. In the presence of nitric oxide, the reduction of cytochrome c^{3+} is inhibited. This leads to the oxidisation of cytochrome c^{2+} to cytochrome c^{3+} by peroxynitrous acid, an intermediate made through the reaction of nitric oxide and superoxide. Presence of peroxynitrite or H_{2}O_{2} and nitrogen dioxide NO_{2} in the mitochondria can be lethal since they nitrate tyrosine residues of cytochrome c, which leads to disruption of cytochrome c's function as an electron carrier in the electron transport chain.

=== As an enzyme for catalytic activity ===
Cytochrome c has also been widely studied as an enzyme with peroxidase-like activity. Cytochrome c was conjugated to charged polymer to test its peroxidase-like activity. Inspired from natural examples of enzyme encapsulation in protein-based cage structures (Example: Carboxysomes, ferritin, and encapsulin), Cytochrome c was encapsulated in a 9 nm small self-assembling DNA binding protein from nutrient starved cells (Dps) protein cage using chimeric self-assembly approach. Authors observed unique catalytic activity behavior upon encapsulating enzyme inside a protein-cage, which was different from enzyme in solution. This was attributed to local microenvironment provided by Dps nanocage's interior cavity which is different than bulk.

== See also ==
- Cytochrome c oxidase
- Methanol dehydrogenase (cytochrome c)
