= Neodymium compounds =

Chemical compounds with at least one neodymium atom

Neodymium compounds are compounds formed by the lanthanide metal neodymium (Nd). In these compounds, neodymium generally exhibits the +3 oxidation state, such as NdCl_{3}, Nd_{2}(SO_{4})_{3} and Nd(CH_{3}COO)_{3}. Compounds with neodymium in the +2 oxidation state are also known, such as NdCl_{2} and NdI_{2}. Some neodymium compounds have colors that vary based upon the type of lighting.

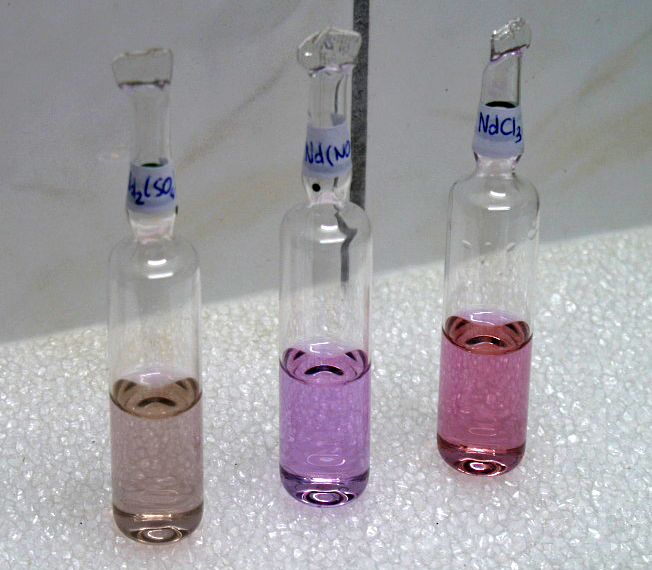
Neodymium compounds in fluorescent tube light—from left to right, the sulfate, nitrate, and chloride

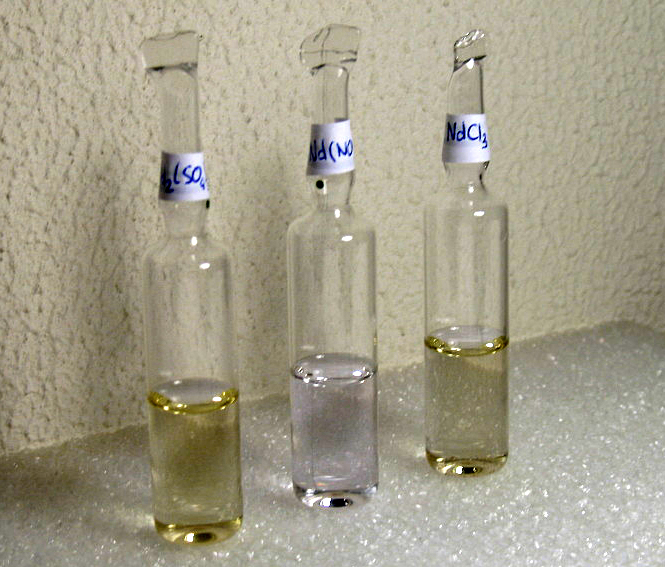
Neodymium compounds in compact fluorescent lamp light

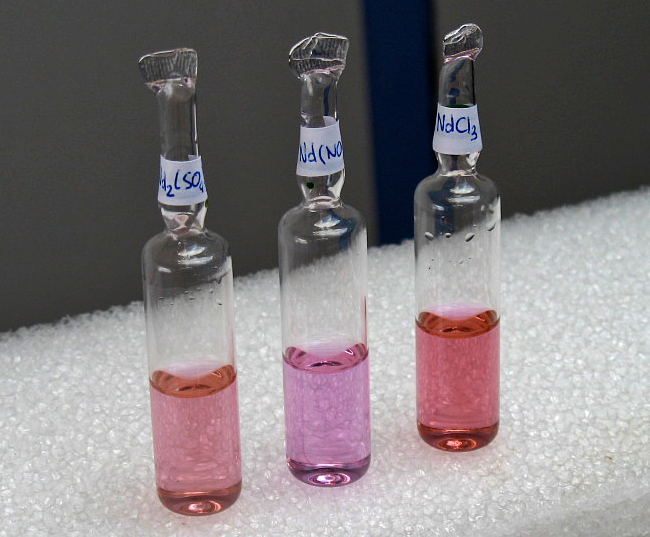
Neodymium compounds in normal daylight

== Halides ==
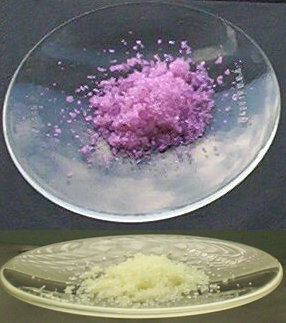
NdCl_{3} under sunlight (top) and fluorescent light (bottom)

Neodymium can form four trihalides of the form NdX_{3}. It reacts vigorously with all the stable halogens:

2Nd (s) + 3F_{2} (g) → 2NdF_{3} (s) [a violet substance]
2Nd (s) + 3Cl_{2} (g) → 2NdCl_{3} (s) [a mauve substance]
2Nd (s) + 3Br_{2} (g) → 2NdBr_{3} (s) [a violet substance]
2Nd (s) + 3I_{2} (g) → 2NdI_{3} (s) [a green substance]

The dihalides NdCl_{2} and NdBr_{2} are dark green solids, with the same crystal structure as PbCl_{2} and NdI_{2} is a dark purple solid. They can be obtained in the Nd-NdX_{3} eutectic system.

NdF_{4} is known only under matrix isolation conditions. The related M_{3}[NdF_{7}] (M = K, Rb, Cs) are very unstable towards moisture or heat. They can be prepared by high-pressure fluorination or from noble gas fluorides.

== Oxygenated salts ==
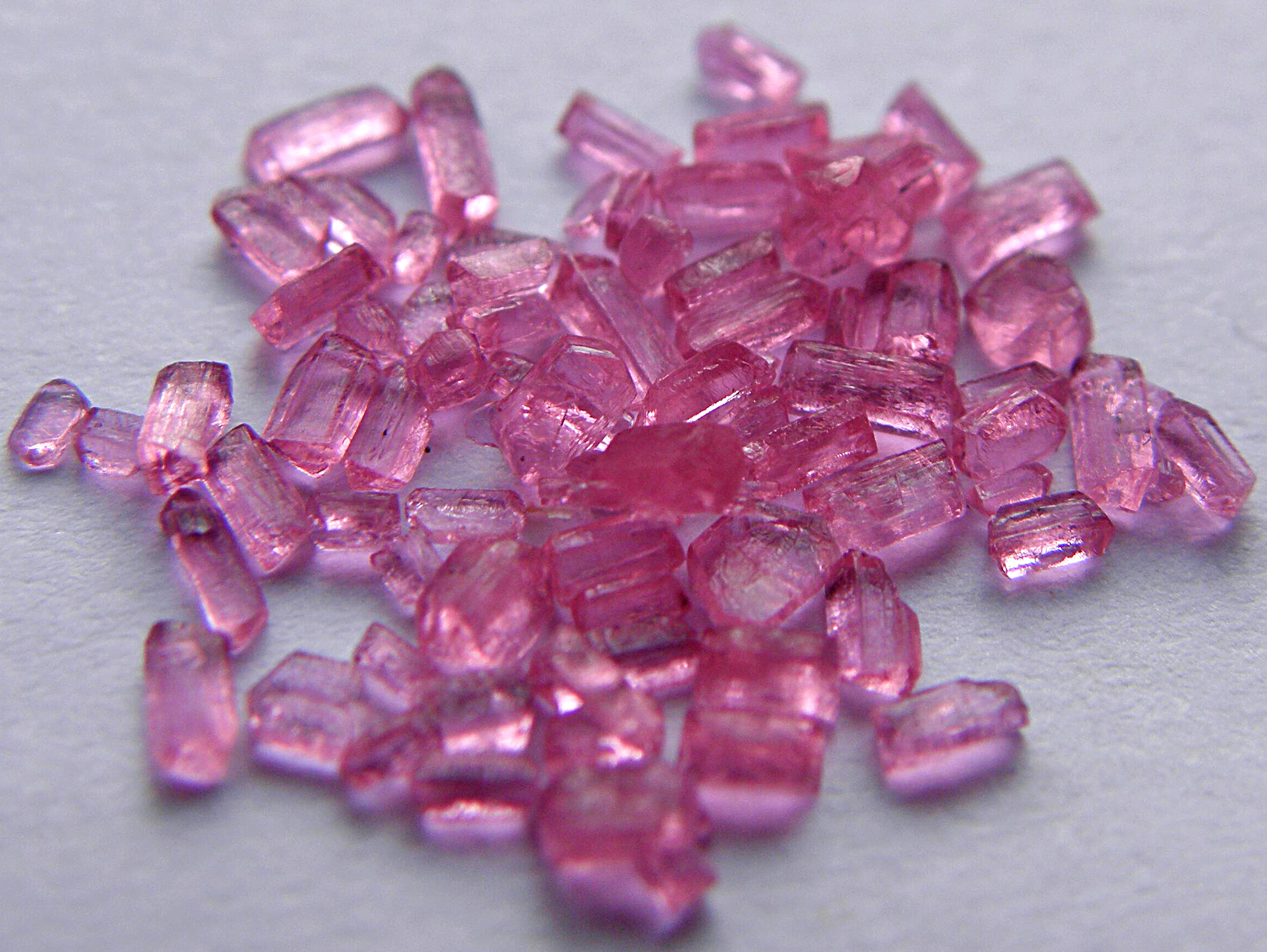
Neodymium(III) sulfate crystals

Neodymium(III) sulfate can be directly obtained by dissolving neodymium(III) oxide in sulfuric acid. It is soluble in water, and its anhydrous form has a solubility of 8 g at 20˚C. Neodymium(III) nitrate can be obtained by dissolving neodymium(III) oxide in nitric acid. Evaporating the resulting solution yields hydrated neodymium(III) nitrate, where the hexahydrate form is the most common. Heating the hexahydrate further will obtain the anhydrous form. Reacting neodymium(III) chloride with sodium arsenate in solution would obtain neodymium(III) arsenate, which is a faint pink powder that is insoluble in water. It has good thermal stability, and its solubility product pK_{sp,c} is 21.86±0.11. Neodymium(III) oxalate is a rose-coloured crystal which decomposes from its decahydrate to its anhydrous form when heated, and when heated further, decomposes to Nd_{2}O_{2}C_{2}O_{4}, and then finally obtaining neodymium(III) oxide. Neodymium(III) carbonate is the carbonate of neodymium where neodymium exhibits the +3 oxidation state. It can be obtained by reacting neodymium(III) chloride with ammonium bicarbonate in water or from the hydrolysis of neodymium(III) chloroacetate:

2Nd(C_{2}Cl_{3}O_{2})_{3} + 3H_{2}O → Nd_{2}(CO_{3})_{3} + 6CHCl_{3} + 3CO_{2}

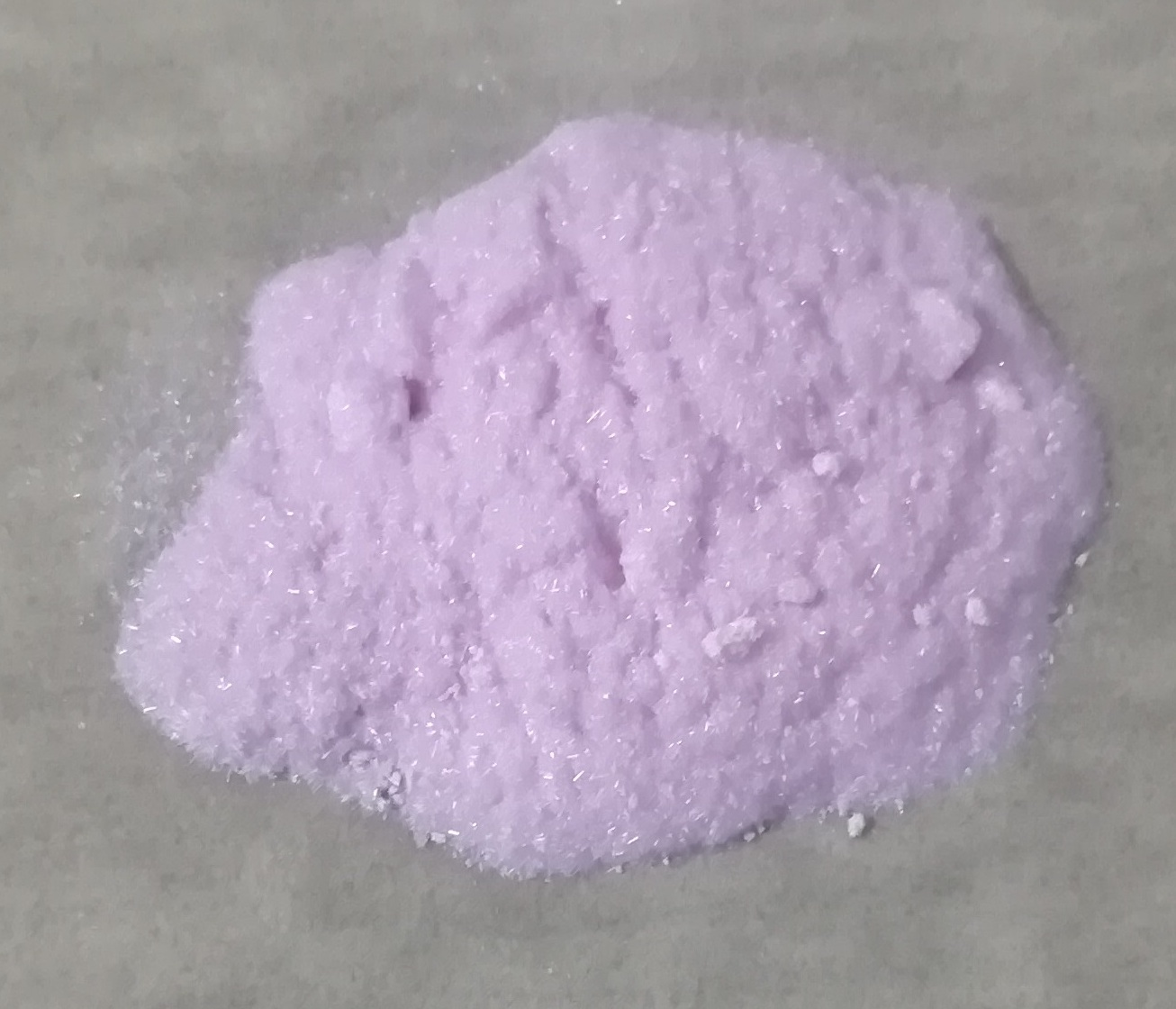
Neodymium acetate powder

Neodymium(III) acetate is a purple solid that is soluble in water. The solubility of the compound increases when sodium acetate is added, forming a blue complex. It can be obtained by the reaction of neodymium(III) chloride and sodium acetate:

NdCl_{3} + 3Na(CH_{3}COO) → Nd(CH_{3}COO)_{3} + 3NaCl

== Organoneodymium compounds ==
Organoneodymium compounds are compounds that have a neodymium–carbon bond. These compounds are similar to those of the other lanthanides, characterized by an inability to undergo π backbonding. They are thus mostly restricted to the mostly ionic cyclopentadienides (isostructural with those of lanthanum) and the σ-bonded simple alkyls and aryls, some of which may be polymeric.

== Applications ==
Neodymium(III) chloride does not have strong luminescence, though it serves as a source of Nd^{3+} ions for various light emitting materials. The latter include Nd-YAG lasers and Nd-doped optical fiber amplifiers, which amplify light emitted by other lasers. The Nd-YAG laser emits infrared light at 1.064 micrometres and is the most popular solid-state laser (i.e. laser based on a solid medium).

Neodymium glass (Nd:glass) is produced by the inclusion of neodymium(III) oxide (Nd_{2}O_{3}) in the glass melt. Usually in daylight or incandescent light neodymium glass appears lavender, but it appears pale blue under fluorescent lighting. Neodymium may be used to color glass in delicate shades ranging from pure violet through wine-red and warm gray.

Neodymium(III) acetate can be used as a substitute for uranyl acetate, which is used in electron microscopy.
