= Neodymium(III) perchlorate =

Identifiers
CAS Number	13498-06-1
3D model (JSmol)	Interactive image
ChemSpider	21160135
ECHA InfoCard	100.033.459
EC Number	236-821-8
PubChem CID	13783607
- InChI: InChI=1S/3ClHO4.Nd/c3*2-1(3,4)5;/h3*(H,2,3,4,5);/q;;;+3/p-3 Key: HBKMAYJLXKBOER-UHFFFAOYSA-K
- SMILES: [O-]Cl(=O)(=O)=O.[O-]Cl(=O)(=O)=O.[O-]Cl(=O)(=O)=O.[Nd+3]

Properties
Chemical formula	Nd(ClO_{4})_{3}
Molar mass	442.5929 g/mol (anhydrate); 514.65402 g/mol (tetrahydrate); 523.66166 g/mol (4.5 hydrate); 550.68458 g/mol (hexahydrate)
Appearance	light purple crystals (anhydrous)
Density	3.33 g/cm³ (anhydrate)
Solubility in water	tan
Solubility	soluble in hydrazine

Structure
Crystal structure	Yb(ReO_{4})_{3}, α = 90°, β = 90°, γ = 120°
Lattice constant	a = 0.9341 nm, b = 0.9341 nm, c = 0.5835 nm

Hazards
- GHS labelling
Pictograms	(GHS03: Oxidizing) (GHS07: Exclamation mark)
Signal word	Danger
Hazard statements	H271, H315, H319, H335
Precautionary statements	P210, P220, P221, P264, P271, P280, P302, P304, P305, P312, P313, P332, P338, P340, P351, P352, P362, P370, P378, P501

Related compounds
Other cations	Praseodymium(III) perchlorate Samarium(III) perchlorate
- Except where otherwise noted, data are given for materials in their standard state (at 25 °C [77 °F], 100 kPa). Infobox references

Neodymium(III) perchlorate is an inorganic compound. It is a salt of neodymium and perchloric acid with the chemical formula of Nd(ClO_{4})_{3}. It is soluble in water, forming purple-pink, hydrated crystals.

== Properties ==
=== Physical properties ===
Neodymium(III) perchlorate forms pale purple crystals when in its anhydrous form.

It is soluble in water, forming a fluorescent solution.

It forms crystals Nd(ClO_{4})_{3}·nH_{2}O, where n = 4, 4.5 are purple-pink crystals, and n = 6 forms pale pink to lavender crystals.

=== Alkaline salts ===
Nd(ClO_{4})_{3} can form alkaline salts, with the general formula of Nd(OH)_{x}(ClO_{4})_{3 − x}. The salt with x = 1.5 (saturated with 5 water atoms) is a light purple crystal with d = 2.88 g/cm³.

=== Other compounds ===
Nd(ClO_{4})_{3} can form compounds with hydrazine, such as Nd(ClO_{4})_{3}·6N_{2}H_{4}·4H_{2}O which is a small white crystal that is soluble in water, methanol, ethanol and acetone, and insoluble in toluene, with density of 2,3271 g/cm³ at 20 °C.
