= Neodymium(III) formate =

Names
- IUPAC name Neodymium(III) formate

Identifiers
CAS Number	3252-53-7
3D model (JSmol)	Interactive image
ChemSpider	131573383
PubChem CID	21943839
CompTox Dashboard (EPA)	DTXSID50620535
- InChI: InChI=1S/3CH2O2.Nd/c3*2-1-3;/h3*1H,(H,2,3);/q;;;+3/p-3 Key: AARCLZBTVAUMJK-UHFFFAOYSA-K
- SMILES: C(=O)[O-].C(=O)[O-].C(=O)[O-].[Nd+3]

Properties
Chemical formula	Nd(HCOO)_{3}
Molar mass	279.30 g/mol
Appearance	Pink crystalline solid

Structure
Crystal structure	trigonal
Space group	R3m (No. 160)
Lattice constant	a = 10.596 Å, c = 4.0588 Å
Lattice volume (V)	394.6 Å^{3}
Formula units (Z)	3 units per cell
- Except where otherwise noted, data are given for materials in their standard state (at 25 °C [77 °F], 100 kPa). Infobox references

Neodymium(III) formate is an inorganic compound of neodymium and formic acid, with the chemical formula Nd(HCOO)_{3}, also written Nd(HCO_{2})_{3}. It is a pink crystalline rare-earth formate.

== Properties ==
Anhydrous neodymium(III) formate crystallizes in the trigonal crystal system, in the space group R3m (No. 160).

Each Nd(III) ion is coordinated by nine oxygen atoms from nine formate anions. The formate ligands bridge neighbouring neodymium centres to produce a three-dimensional neutral coordination framework. The nearest-neighbour Nd-Nd separation is 4.0588(8) Å.

On heating, neodymium(III) formate decomposes through a neodymium oxycarbonate intermediate. For the lighter rare-earth formates, including neodymium formate, the principal sequence can be represented as formation of Nd_{2}O_{2}CO_{3}, followed at higher temperature by conversion to neodymium(III) oxide, Nd_{2}O_{3}. The oxycarbonate formed from neodymium formate has a monoclinic-type structure.

== Preparation ==
Neodymium(III) formate can be prepared by reaction of neodymium salts with formic acid. For example, neodymium nitrate hexahydrate dissolves in concentrated formic acid at room temperature and yields neodymium formate on prolonged reaction and evaporation.

Single crystals have also been obtained under hydrothermal conditions from neodymium nitrate and formate-containing reaction mixtures.
