= Neodymium(III) iodate =

Identifiers
CAS Number	14732-16-2 anhydrous; 55713-55-8 monohydrate
3D model (JSmol)	Interactive image
ChemSpider	20082422
EC Number	238-789-0
PubChem CID	21149363
- InChI: InChI=1S/3HIO3.Nd/c3*2-1(3)4;/h3*(H,2,3,4);/q;;;+3/p-3 Key: SEHRUTVBKBCDGC-UHFFFAOYSA-K
- SMILES: [O-]I(=O)=O.[O-]I(=O)=O.[O-]I(=O)=O.[Nd+3]

Properties
Chemical formula	Nd(IO_{3})_{3}
Molar mass	668.95 g/mol
Appearance	purple solid
- Except where otherwise noted, data are given for materials in their standard state (at 25 °C [77 °F], 100 kPa). Infobox references

Neodymium(III) iodate is an inorganic compound with the chemical formula Nd(IO_{3})_{3}.

== Preparation ==
Neodymium(III) iodate can be produced by the hydrothermal reaction of neodymium(III) nitrate or neodymium(III) oxide and iodic acid in water at 230 °C:

Nd(NO_{3})_{3} + 3 HIO_{3} → Nd(IO_{3})_{3} + 3 HNO_{3}
Nd_{2}O_{3} + 6 HIO_{3} → 2 Nd(IO_{3})_{3} + 3 H_{2}O

== Properties ==
Neodymium(III) iodate can be thermally decomposed as follows:

7 Nd(IO_{3})_{3} → Nd_{5}(IO_{6})_{3} + Nd_{2}O_{3} + 9 I_{2} + 21 O_{2}

Its monohydrate is known, crystallizing in the monoclinic crystal system, with space group P2_{1}, and its pyroelectric coefficient at room temperature is 2.2×10^{−5} C·m^{−2}/K.
