= Neodymium(III) sulfate =

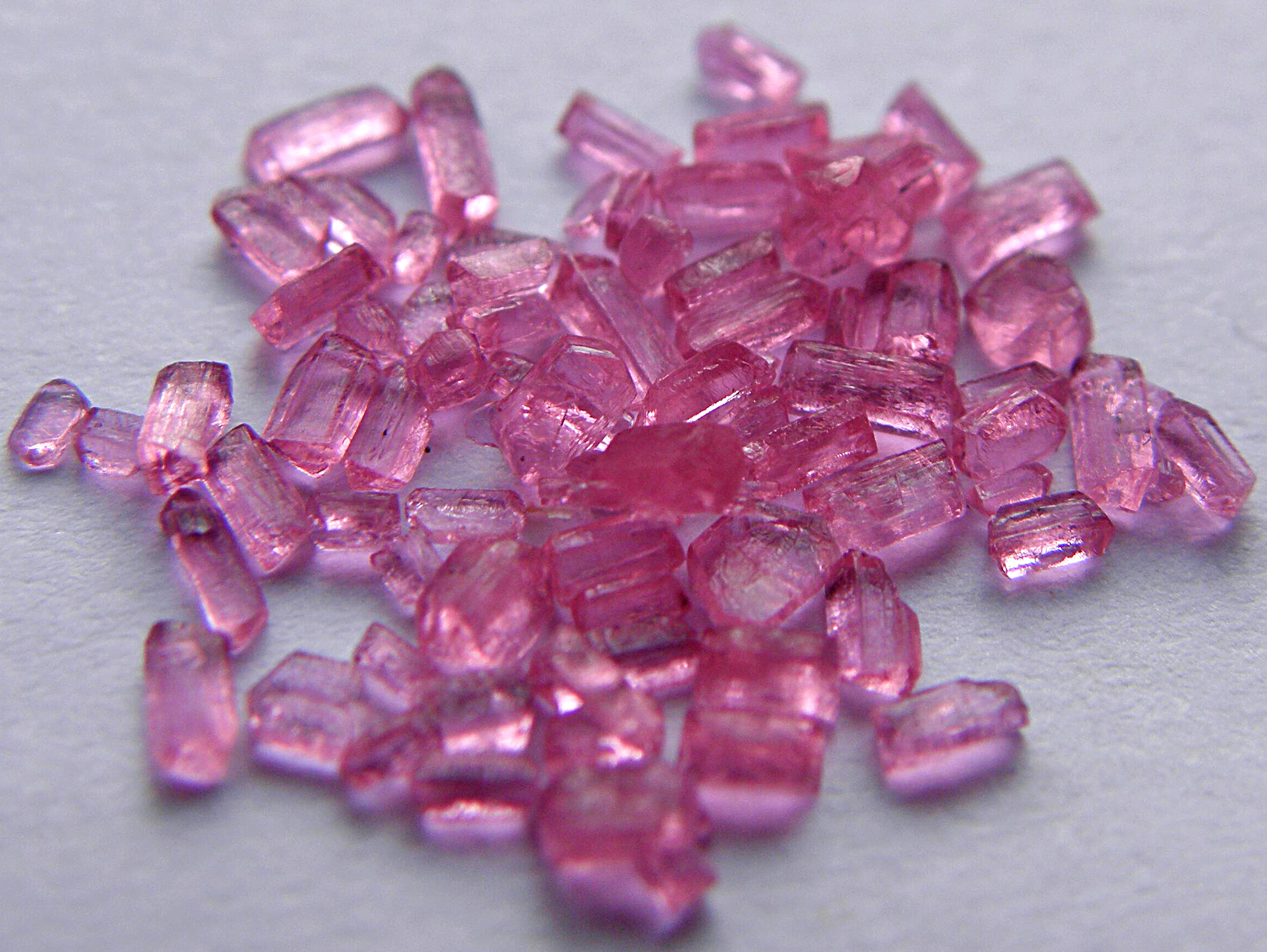
- Octahydrate

Names
- IUPAC name Neodymium(III) trisulfate
- Other names: Neodyous sulfate; Neodymium sulfate

Identifiers
CAS Number	10101-95-8
3D model (JSmol)	Interactive image
ChemSpider	21241399
ECHA InfoCard	100.030.225
EC Number	233-262-1
PubChem CID	165814
UNII	4Q1946CN7K
CompTox Dashboard (EPA)	DTXSID00890625
- InChI: InChI=1S/2Nd.3H2O4S/c;;3*1-5(2,3)4/h;;3*(H2,1,2,3,4)/q2*+3;;;/p-6 Key: OJSWEKSDNUORPG-UHFFFAOYSA-H
- SMILES: [O-]S(=O)(=O)[O-].[O-]S(=O)(=O)[O-].[O-]S(=O)(=O)[O-].[Nd+3].[Nd+3]

Properties
Chemical formula	Nd_{2}(SO_{4})_{3}
Molar mass	576.7 g/mol
Appearance	Pink crystals
Density	2.85 g/cm^{3}
Melting point	700 °C (1,292 °F; 973 K)
Solubility in water	8 g/100 ml (20 °C)
Solubility	Soluble in sulfuric acid

Structure
Crystal structure	Monoclinic
Space group	C2/c
Lattice constant	a = 13.76 Å, b = 7.20 Å, c = 18.65 Å

Explosive data
Shock sensitivity	Not explosive
Friction sensitivity	Not explosive

Hazards
- Occupational safety and health (OHS/OSH)
Main hazards	Irritant
- GHS labelling
Pictograms	(GHS07: Exclamation mark)
Hazard statements	H315, H319, H335
Precautionary statements	P261, P280, P304, P305+P351+P338, P340, P405, P501
NFPA 704 (fire diamond)	1 0 1
Flash point	Not flammable
Autoignition temperature	Not flammable

Related compounds
Other anions	Neodymium nitrate
Other cations	Praseodymium(III) sulfate
Related compounds	Neodymium sulfate octahydrate
- Except where otherwise noted, data are given for materials in their standard state (at 25 °C [77 °F], 100 kPa). Infobox references

Neodymium(III) sulfate is a salt of the rare-earth metal neodymium that has the formula Nd_{2}(SO_{4})_{3}. It forms multiple hydrates, the octa-, penta-, and the dihydrate, which the octahydrate is the most common. This compound has a retrograde solubility, unlike other compounds, its solubility decreases with increasing temperature. This compound is used in glass for extremely powerful lasers.

== Preparation ==
Neodymium sulfate is produced by dissolving neodymium(III) oxide in sulfuric acid:

Nd_{2}O_{3} + 3 H_{2}SO_{4} → Nd_{2}(SO_{4})_{3} + 3 H_{2}O

It can also be prepared by the reaction of neodymium(III) perchlorate and sodium sulfate.

== Properties ==
Neodymium sulfate octahydrate decomposes at 40 °C to the pentahydrate, which in turn decomposes to the dihydrate at 145 °C. The dihydrate dehydrates to the anhydrous form at 290 °C.
