= Vanadates =

Vanadates can refer to:

- Ammonium metavanadate
- Sodium vanadate (disambiguation)
