= Uranium compounds =

Chemical compound including uranium

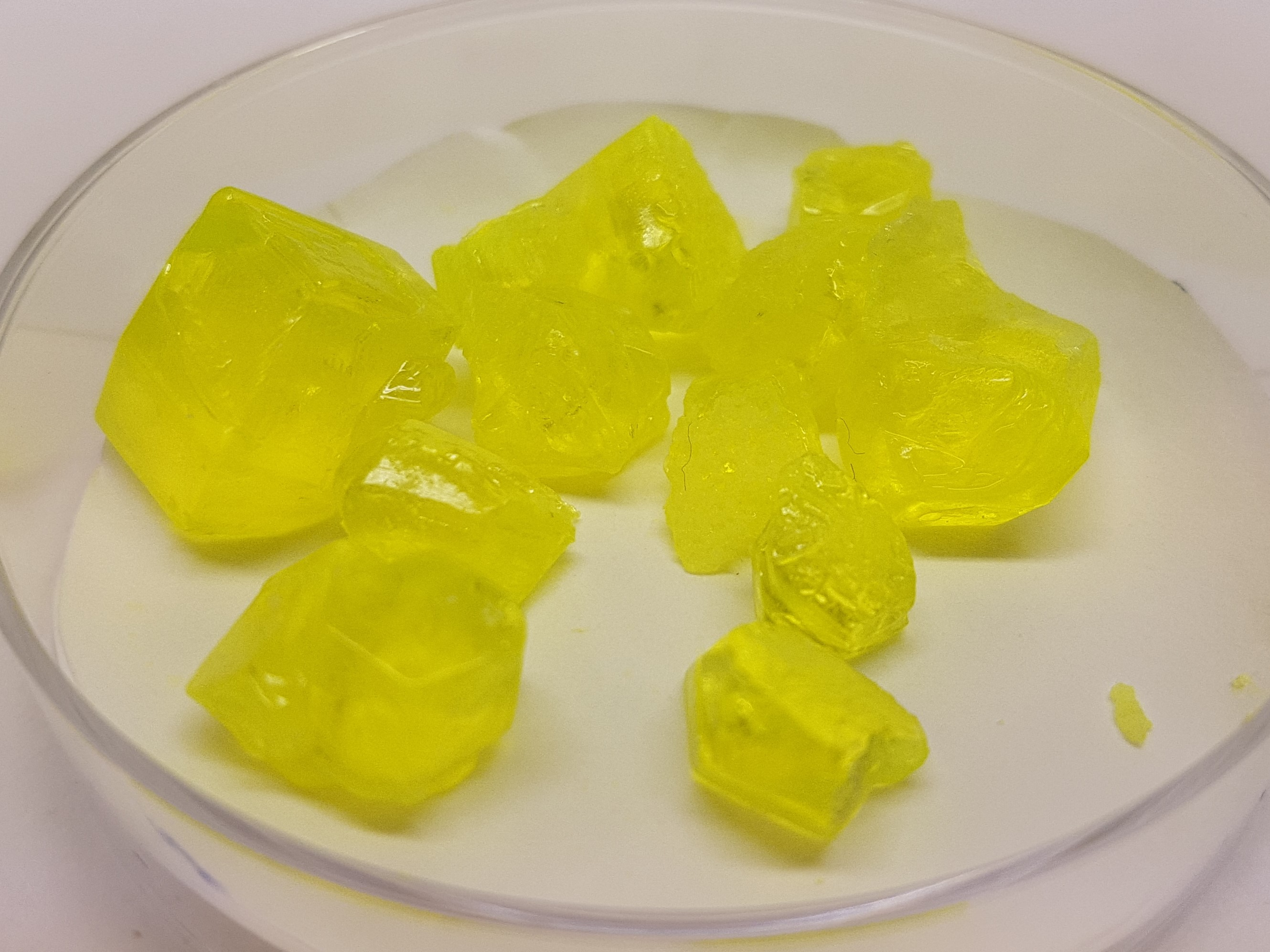
A sample of uranyl nitrate, a compound of uranium

Uranium compounds are compounds formed by the element uranium (U). Although uranium is a radioactive actinide, its compounds are well studied due to its long half-life and its applications. It usually forms in the +4 and +6 oxidation states, although it can also form in other oxidation states.

== Oxidation States And Oxides ==
=== Oxides ===
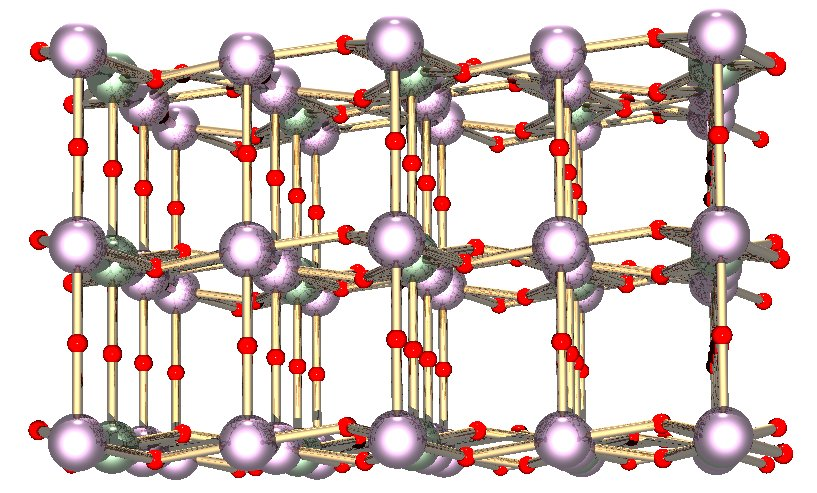
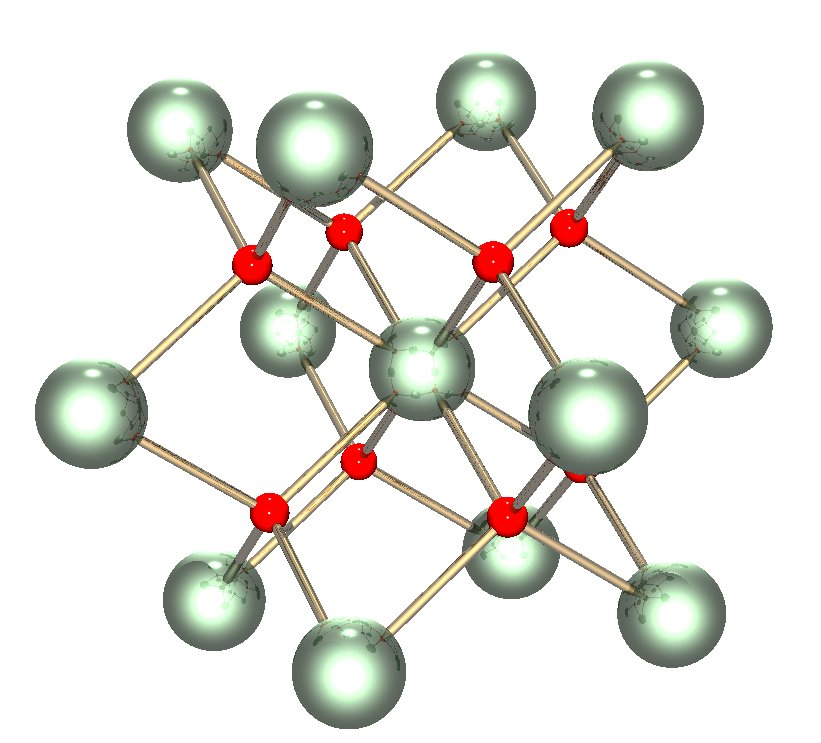
Triuranium octoxide (left) and uranium dioxide (right) are the two most common uranium oxides.

Calcined uranium yellowcake, as produced in many large mills, contains a distribution of uranium oxidation species in various forms ranging from most oxidized to least oxidized. Particles with short residence times in a calciner will generally be less oxidized than those with long retention times or particles recovered in the stack scrubber. Uranium content is usually referenced to U_{3}O_{8}, which dates to the days of the Manhattan Project when U_{3}O_{8} was used as an analytical chemistry reporting standard.

Phase relationships in the uranium-oxygen system are complex. The most important oxidation states of uranium are uranium(IV) and uranium(VI), and their two corresponding oxides are, respectively, uranium dioxide (UO_{2}) and uranium trioxide (UO_{3}). Other uranium oxides such as uranium monoxide (UO), diuranium pentoxide (U_{2}O_{5}), and uranium peroxide (UO_{4}·2H_{2}O) also exist.

The most common forms of uranium oxide are triuranium octoxide (U_{3}O_{8}) and UO_{2}. Both oxide forms are solids that have low solubility in water and are relatively stable over a wide range of environmental conditions. Triuranium octoxide is (depending on conditions) the most stable compound of uranium and is the form most commonly found in nature. Uranium dioxide is the form in which uranium is most commonly used as a nuclear reactor fuel. At ambient temperatures, UO_{2} will gradually convert to U_{3}O_{8}. Because of their stability, uranium oxides are generally considered the preferred chemical form for storage or disposal.

=== Aqueous chemistry ===
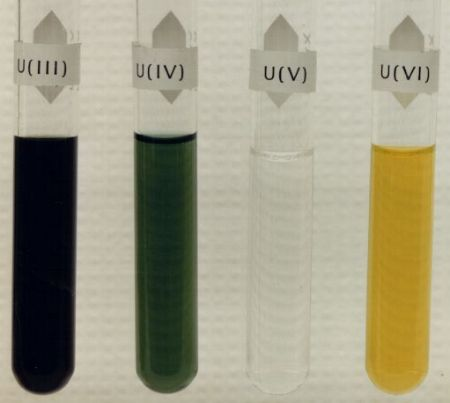
Uranium in its oxidation states III, IV, V, VI

Salts of many oxidation states of uranium are water-soluble and may be studied in aqueous solutions. The most common ionic forms are U^{3+} (brown-red), U^{4+} (green), UO^{+}_{2} (unstable), and UO^{2+}_{2} (yellow), for U(III), U(IV), U(V), and U(VI), respectively. A few solid and semi-metallic compounds such as UO and US exist for the formal oxidation state uranium(II), but no simple ions are known to exist in solution for that state. Ions of U^{3+} liberate hydrogen from water and are therefore considered to be highly unstable. The UO^{2+}_{2} ion represents the uranium(VI) state and is known to form compounds such as uranyl carbonate, uranyl chloride and uranyl sulfate. UO^{2+}_{2} also forms complexes with various organic chelating agents, the most commonly encountered of which is uranyl acetate.

Unlike the uranyl salts of uranium and polyatomic ion uranium-oxide cationic forms, the uranates, salts containing a polyatomic uranium-oxide anion, are generally not water-soluble.

=== Carbonates ===
The interactions of carbonate anions with uranium(VI) cause the Pourbaix diagram to change greatly when the medium is changed from water to a carbonate containing solution. While the vast majority of carbonates are insoluble in water (students are often taught that all carbonates other than those of alkali metals are insoluble in water), uranium carbonates are often soluble in water. This is because a U(VI) cation is able to bind two terminal oxides and three or more carbonates to form anionic complexes.

Pourbaix diagrams
A graph of potential vs. pH showing stability regions of various uranium compounds	A graph of potential vs. pH showing stability regions of various uranium compounds
Uranium in a non-complexing aqueous medium (e.g. perchloric acid/sodium hydroxide).	Uranium in carbonate solution
A graph of potential vs. pH showing stability regions of various uranium compounds	A graph of potential vs. pH showing stability regions of various uranium compounds
Relative concentrations of the different chemical forms of uranium in a non-complexing aqueous medium (e.g. perchloric acid/sodium hydroxide).	Relative concentrations of the different chemical forms of uranium in an aqueous carbonate solution.

=== Effects of pH ===
When the pH is increased of a uranium(VI) solution in a non-complexing aqueous medium, the uranium is converted to a hydrated uranium oxide hydroxide and at high pHs it becomes an anionic hydroxide complex.

When carbonate is added, uranium is converted to a series of carbonate complexes if the pH is increased. One effect of these reactions is increased solubility of uranium in the pH range 6 to 8, a fact that has a direct bearing on the long term stability of spent uranium dioxide nuclear fuels.

== Hydrides, carbides and nitrides ==
Uranium metal heated to 250 to 300 °C (482 to 572 °F) reacts with hydrogen to form uranium hydride. Even higher temperatures will reversibly remove the hydrogen. This property makes uranium hydrides convenient starting materials to create reactive uranium powder along with various uranium carbide, nitride, and halide compounds. Two crystal modifications of uranium hydride exist: an α form that is obtained at low temperatures and a β form that is created when the formation temperature is above 250 °C.

Uranium carbides and uranium nitrides are both relatively inert semimetallic compounds that are minimally soluble in acids, react with water, and can ignite in air to form U_{3}O_{8}. Carbides of uranium include uranium monocarbide (UC), uranium dicarbide (UC_{2}), and diuranium tricarbide (U_{2}C_{3}). Both UC and UC_{2} are formed by adding carbon to molten uranium or by exposing the metal to carbon monoxide at high temperatures. Stable below 1800 °C, U_{2}C_{3} is prepared by subjecting a heated mixture of UC and UC_{2} to mechanical stress. Uranium nitrides obtained by direct exposure of the metal to nitrogen include uranium mononitride (UN), uranium dinitride (UN_{2}), and diuranium trinitride (U_{2}N_{3}).

== Halides ==
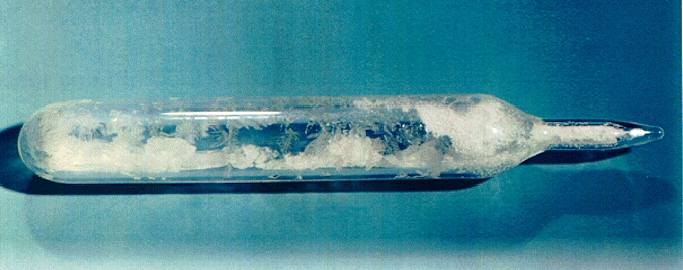
Uranium hexafluoride is the feedstock used to separate uranium-235 from natural uranium.

All uranium fluorides are created using uranium tetrafluoride (UF_{4}); UF_{4} itself is prepared by hydrofluorination of uranium dioxide. Reduction of UF_{4} with hydrogen at 1000 °C produces uranium trifluoride (UF_{3}). Under the right conditions of temperature and pressure, the reaction of solid UF_{4} with gaseous uranium hexafluoride (UF_{6}) can form the intermediate fluorides of U_{2}F_{9}, U_{4}F_{17}, and UF_{5}.

At room temperatures, UF_{6} has a high vapor pressure, making it useful in the gaseous diffusion process to separate the rare uranium-235 from the common uranium-238 isotope. This compound can be prepared from uranium dioxide and uranium hydride by the following process:

UO_{2} + 4 HF → UF_{4} + 2 H_{2}O (500 °C, endothermic)
UF_{4} + F_{2} → UF_{6} (350 °C, endothermic)

The resulting UF_{6}, a white solid, is highly reactive (by fluorination), easily sublimes (emitting a vapor that behaves as a nearly ideal gas), and is the most volatile compound of uranium known to exist.

One method of preparing uranium tetrachloride (UCl_{4}) is to directly combine chlorine with either uranium metal or uranium hydride. The reduction of UCl_{4} by hydrogen produces uranium trichloride (UCl_{3}) while the higher chlorides of uranium are prepared by reaction with additional chlorine. All uranium chlorides react with water and air.

Bromides and iodides of uranium are formed by direct reaction of, respectively, bromine and iodine with uranium or by adding UH_{3} to those element's acids. Known examples include: UBr_{3}, UBr_{4}, UI_{3}, and UI_{4}. UI_{5} has never been prepared. Uranium oxyhalides are water-soluble and include UO_{2}F_{2}, UOCl_{2}, UO_{2}Cl_{2}, and UO_{2}Br_{2}. Stability of the oxyhalides decrease as the atomic weight of the component halide increases.

== See also ==
- Neodymium compounds
- Protactinium compounds
- Neptunium compounds

== Sources ==
- "Chemical Equilibrium Software". Department of Chemistry, KTH Royal Institute of Technology. Archived from the original on 29 September 2007.
- "Chemical Forms of Uranium". Argonne National Laboratory. Archived from the original on 22 September 2006.
- Kloprogge, J. Theo (2021). The periodic table: nature's building blocks: an introduction to the naturally occurring elements, their origins and their uses. Concepcion P. Ponce, Tom A. Loomis. Amsterdam: Elsevier. pp. 861–862. ISBN 978-0-12-821538-8. OCLC 1223058470.
- Seaborg, Glenn T. (1968). "Uranium". The Encyclopedia of the Chemical Elements. Skokie, Illinois: Reinhold Book Corporation. pp. 773–786. LCCN 68029938.
