= Borinic acid =

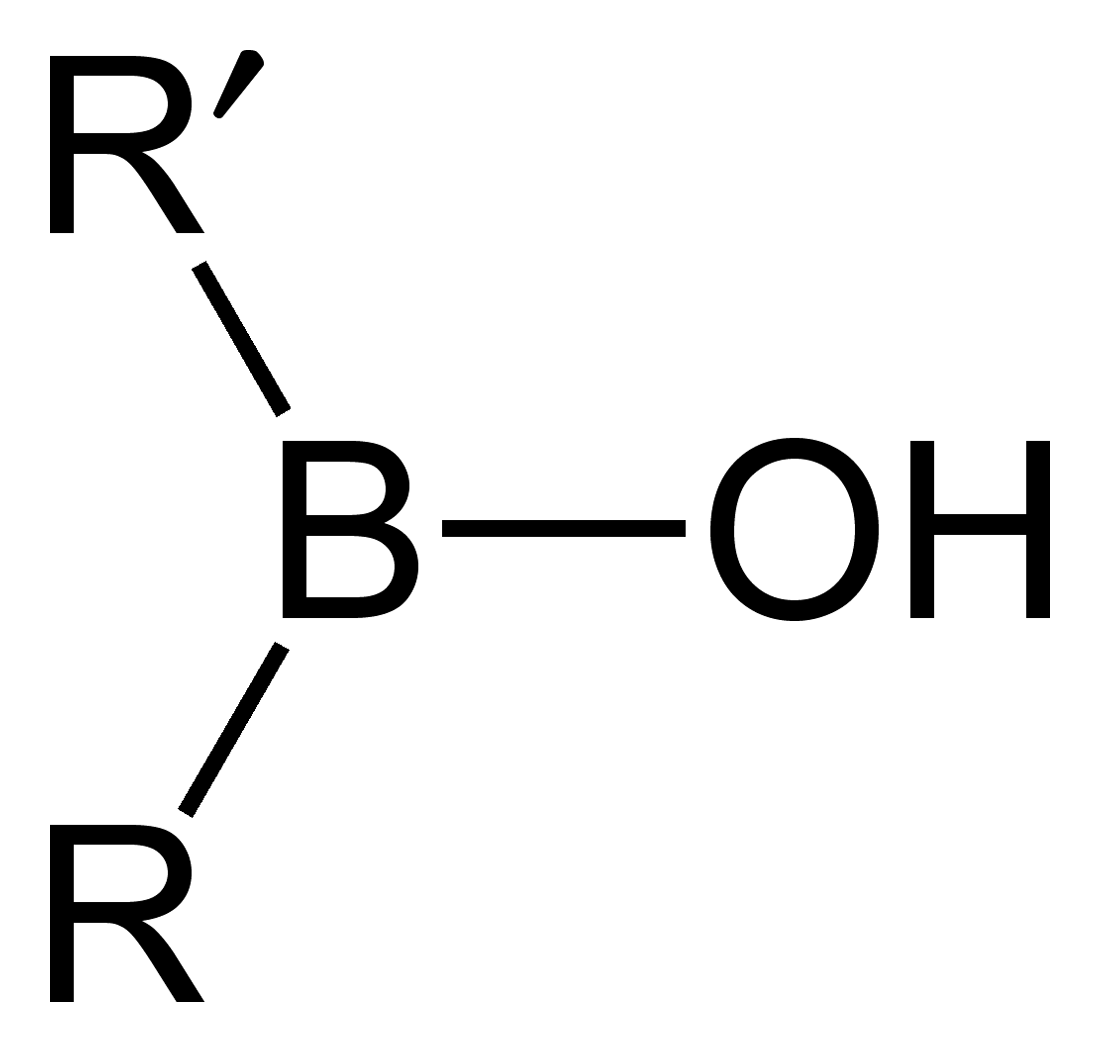
General chemical structure of borinic acids (organoborinic acids)

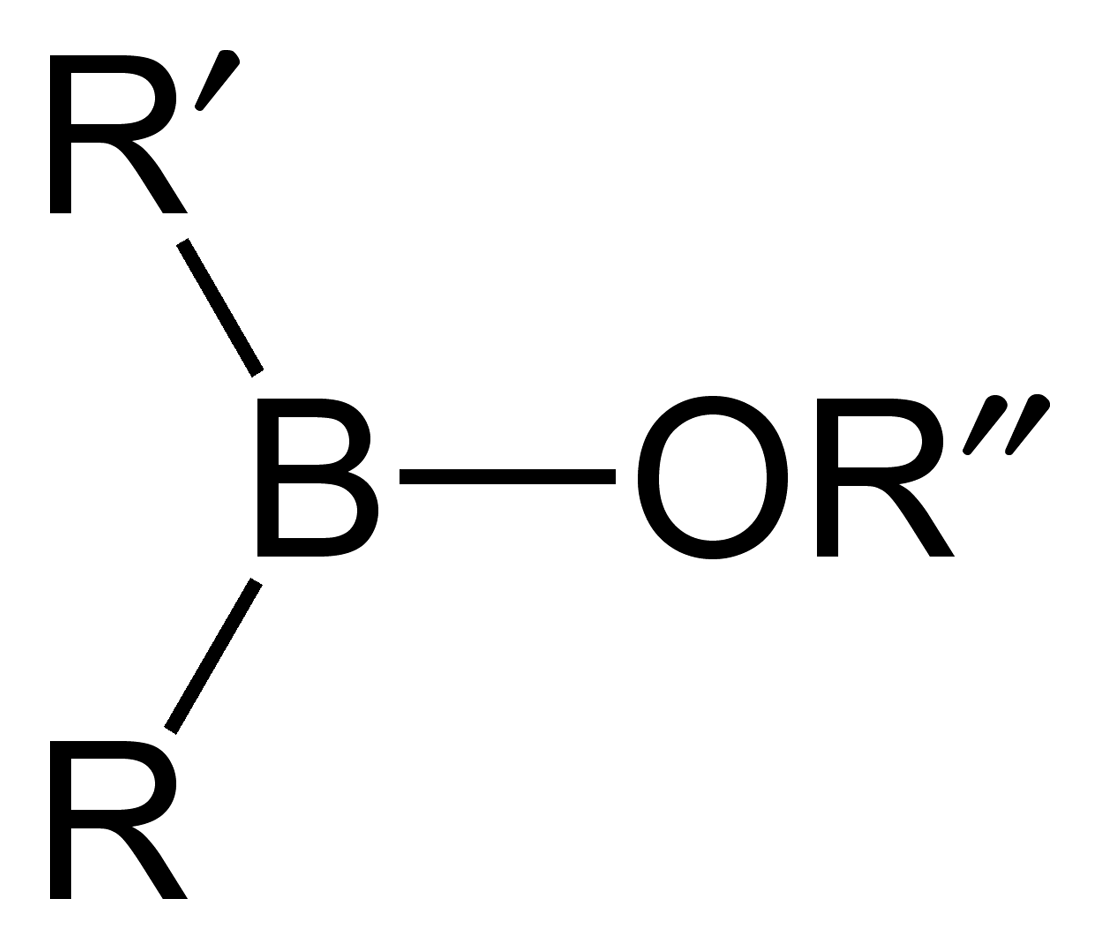
General chemical structure of borinate esters

Borinic acid, also known as boronous acid, is an oxyacid of boron with formula H_{2}BOH. Borinate is the associated anion of borinic acid with formula H_{2}BO^{−}; however, being a Lewis acid, the form in basic solution is H_{2}B(OH)^{−}_{2}. Borinic acids (containing RR'BOH) and borinic esters (RR'BOR") also refer to the families of compounds derived from the parent by replacing hydrogen atoms with more general organyl groups. Their primary application is in academic research.

== Naming ==
The IUPAC name borinic acid is a unique name for the acid. The anhydrides are named diboroxanes, H_{2}BOBH_{2}, as the base compound and H being able to be substituted, e.g. tetraethyldiboroxane, as the anhydride for diethylborinic acid. Organic naming standard in the Bluebook allows skeletal replacement naming where the name is shorter, 3-borapentan-3-ol versus diethyl borinic acid. The grouping -BH-O-BH_{2} is called diboroxanyl. Substituting sulfur for oxygen gives borinothioic acid (H_{2}BSH). (Dimethylboranyl)oxy is used for the group (CH_{3})_{2}B-O− and methyl(hydroxy)boranyl for the grouping CH_{3}B(OH)-.

== Parent compound ==
Borinic acid

Names
- IUPAC name Borinic acid
- Systematic IUPAC name Boranol
- Other names Boranol, Hydroxyborane, Dihydridohydroxidoboron

Identifiers
CAS Number	35825-58-2
3D model (JSmol)	Interactive image
ChEBI	CHEBI:38268
ChemSpider	10706664
Gmelin Reference	141192
PubChem CID	13323622
- InChI: InChI=1S/BH3O/c1-2/h2H,1H2 Key: UYANAUSDHIFLFQ-UHFFFAOYSA-N
- SMILES: BO

Properties
Chemical formula	BH_{3}O
Molar mass	29.83 g·mol^{−1}
Solubility in water	reaction in water

Structure
Molecular shape	distorted trigonal bipyramid

Related compounds
Related compounds	Boronic acid Boric acid
- Except where otherwise noted, data are given for materials in their standard state (at 25 °C [77 °F], 100 kPa). (what is ?) Infobox references

Borinic acid can be formed as the first step in the hydrolysis of diborane:

BH_{3} + H_{2}O → H_{2}BOH + H_{2}

It is also produced by the comproportionation of boric acid and diborane, though this reaction is unfavorable, with an equilibrium constant at 300 K of between 10^{−5} and 10^{−4}:

1/3B_{2}H_{6} + 1/3B(OH)_{3} ⇌ H_{2}BOH

Borinic acid itself is unstable and only lasts for a few seconds during the hydrolysis reaction. However, by using microwave spectroscopy various properties can be determined. The B-O distance is 1.352 Å, O-H distance 0.96 Å, B-H length is probably 1.2 Å. The angle between bonds at the oxygen atom BOH = 112° and the angles at boron are cis-HBO 121°, and trans-HBO = 117°. The dipole moment is 1.506 Debye.

Borinic acid can form esters such as methoxyborane. This too is unstable only lasting about ten seconds. It can be formed by heating diborane and methanol gas together.

== Formation ==
There are several ways to produce substituted borinic acids.

Firstly borinic acids can be made from oxidizing trialkylborane starting materials (R_{3}B) with exposure to moist air, or treatment with iodine, which makes a dialkyliodoborane (R_{2}BI). Hydrolysis then results in the boronic acid (R_{2}BOH). Dialkyl boron chloride (R_{2}BCl) with tertiary amine react with ketones to form an enol borinate. Such alcoholysis products require purification, as often boronic esters will also be produced and mixed in with the borinic esters. The method of Letsinger is to dissolve the mixture in ether and precipitate the borinic ester as an ammonia complex. Treatment with ethanolamine ends up making an aminoethylborinate.

Secondly, trialkylborates [(RO)_{3}B] or trialkoxyboroxine [(ROBO)_{3}] can be reduced to borinic acid by use of a Grignard reagent. Grignard reagents can also reduce a boronic ester [RB(OR')_{2}] to a borinic ester.

Bu_{3}B + N_{2}CHCOR → BuCH=C(R)OBBu_{2}
Bu_{3}B + CH_{2}=CHCOCH_{3} → BuCH_{2}CH=C(CH_{3})OBBu_{2}
RCOC_{2}H_{5} + R_{2}BOTf → RC(OBR_{2})=CHCH_{3}

(Tf = Trifluoromethanesulfonate)

Likewise, a trialkoxyborane can react with lithium containing organic molecules to eliminate lithium and one or two alkoxy groups to make boronic and borinic esters.

Finally, trialkylboranes can reduce starting materials directly.

HB(C_{6}F_{5})_{2} + phosphino alcohol → ^{t}Bu_{2}P^{+}HCH_{2}C(CH_{3})_{2}OB^{−}H(C_{6}F_{5})_{2} → H_{2} + ^{t}Bu_{2}PCH_{2}C(CH_{3})_{2}OB(C_{6}F_{5})_{2}

and same for ^{t}Bu_{2}PCH_{2}C(CF_{3})_{2}OB(C_{6}F_{5})_{2} di-Tris(tert-butoxy)siloxy borinic acid HOB[OSi(O(t)Bu)_{3}]_{2} can be made from tributoxyborate and tributoxysiloxane. It can form a very complex crystal with Cp_{2}Zr(Me)[OB[OSi(O(t)Bu)_{3}]_{2}]_{2}.

== Compounds ==
A wide variety of borinic acids, anhydrides ((R_{2}B)_{2}O), and esters (R_{2}BOR′) are known. Diborinic acids have two RBOH groups linked together by an organic connection such as diphenyl or phenyl.

Besides those below, other compounds include methoxy(dimethyl)borane, methoxy(methyl)boron, methoxy(methylidene)borane (with a C=B double bond).

=== 2-APB ===
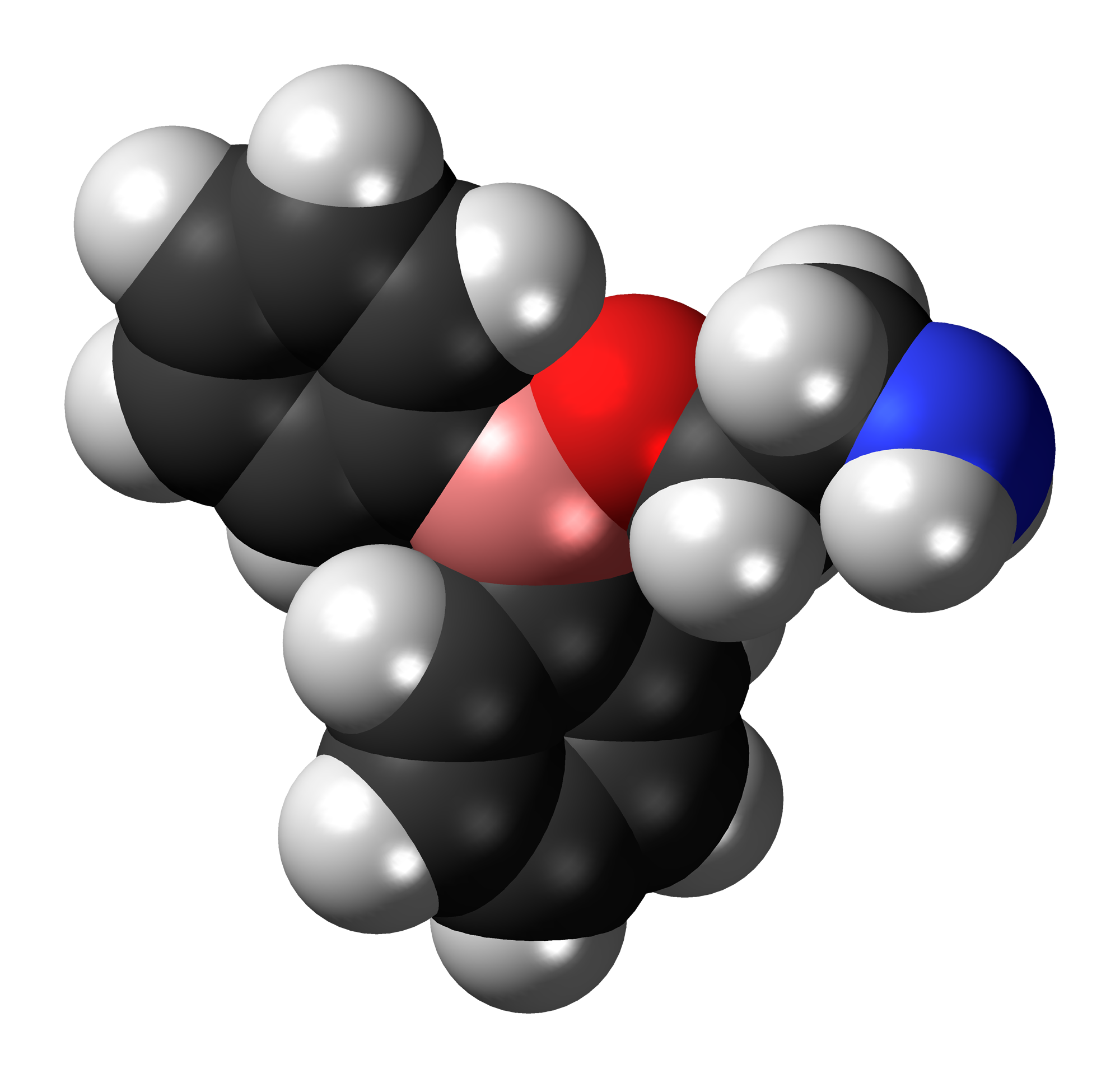
2-aminoethyl-diphenylborinate

2-Aminoethoxydiphenyl borate (2-APB) inhibits transient receptor potential channels. This kind of inhibition, particularly inhibition of TRPM7, is being studied to find treatments for prostate cancer. 2-APB can work as a catalyst to add an alkyl group from an alkyl halide to a polyol or carbohydrate that contains a cis-vicinal diol to a precise position. It does this by first combining with the two hydroxy groups to make a ring containing OCCOB^{−}. It can also calatlyse acid chloride or chloroformate reaction a specific region of the diol.

=== Diphenylborinic acid ===
Diphenylborinic acid was discovered in 1894 by Michaelis who produced it by hydrolyzing the chloride. Letsinger determined its properties in 1955. Diphenylborinic acid can catalyse the condensation of pyruvic acids with aldehydes to yield substituted isotetronic acid. Diphenylborinic acid has an extra high affinity for catechols compared with carbohydrates.

Diphenylborinic acid is an inhibitor of several enzymes such as α-chymotrypsin, subtilisin BPN', and trypsin.

== Reactions ==
Esters will tend to be stable in acidic conditions, but in alkaline conditions the boron atom can gain a negative charge and attach two hydroxyl groups, or two ester bonds. RR'B^{−}(OH)_{2} or RR'B^{−}(OR")_{2}. The anionic borinate ion can very easily form esters with diols such as ethylene glycol or sugars.

Borinate radicals (RR'BO^{·}) can be formed from peroxyborinate decomposition.

Chiral boronates enol esters are applied in academia for enantioselective aldol reactions. (Z)-Enolates give syn products, whereas (E)-enolates give anti products.

1,1,1,3,3,3-Hexafluoroisopropylbis(pentafluorophenyl)borinate can greatly increase solubility of LiF by complexing the F^{−} anion.

Borinic esters are being researched as bacterial growth inhibitors due to their ability to disable some bacterial enzymes such as menaquinone methyltransferase and CcrM.

== Extra reading ==
- Dimitrijević, Elena; Taylor, Mark S. (3 May 2013). "Organoboron Acids and Their Derivatives as Catalysts for Organic Synthesis". ACS Catalysis. 3 (5): 945–962. doi:10.1021/cs4000848. Review of use borinic acids as a catalyst
- Roth, HJ; Miller, B (September 1964). "Synthesis of Phenyl- and Thienyl-Substituted Boronic and Borinic Acids". Archiv der Pharmazie. 297 (9): 513–523. doi:10.1002/ardp.19642970902. PMID 14341914. S2CID 95181696.
