= Samarium(III) perchlorate =

Identifiers
CAS Number	13569-60-3
3D model (JSmol)	Interactive image; hexahydrate: Interactive image
ChemSpider	20100830
PubChem CID	15242765; hexahydrate: 132276547
- InChI: InChI=1S/3ClHO4.Sm/c3*2-1(3,4)5;/h3*(H,2,3,4,5);/q;;;+3/p-3 Key: YAMIWWIPGQYPFX-UHFFFAOYSA-K; hexahydrate: InChI=1S/3ClHO4.6H2O.Sm/c3*2-1(3,4)5;;;;;;;/h3*(H,2,3,4,5);6*1H2;/q;;;;;;;;;+3/p-3 Key: IKKRFRFOUOWDEA-UHFFFAOYSA-K
- SMILES: [O-]Cl(=O)(=O)=O.[O-]Cl(=O)(=O)=O.[O-]Cl(=O)(=O)=O.[Sm+3]; hexahydrate: O.O.O.O.O.O.[O-]Cl(=O)(=O)=O.[O-]Cl(=O)(=O)=O.[O-]Cl(=O)(=O)=O.[Sm+3]

Properties
Chemical formula	Cl_{3}O_{12}Sm
Molar mass	448.70 g·mol^{−1}
Appearance	white solid pale yellow crystals
Solubility in water	soluble in water and ethanol
- Except where otherwise noted, data are given for materials in their standard state (at 25 °C [77 °F], 100 kPa). Infobox references

Samarium(III) perchlorate is an inorganic compound with the chemical formula Sm(ClO_{4})_{3}.

== Preparation ==
Samarium(III) perchlorate can be obtained by the reaction of perchloric acid and samarium(III) oxide. The hydrate precipitated from the solution can be dehydrated with dichlorine hexoxide to obtain the anhydrous form.

== Properties ==
Anhydrous samarium(III) perchlorate forms hexagonal crystals, space group P63/m, unit cell parameters a=9.259 Å, c=5.746 Å, Z=2. It reacts with ammonium thiocyanate and 1-butyl-3-methylimidazolium thiocyanate ([BMIM]SCN) in absolute ethanol to obtain the ionic liquid [BMIM]_{4}[Sm(NCS)_{7}(H_{2}O)].
