= Praseodymium(III) perchlorate =

Praseodymium perchlorate
- Structure of praseodymium perchlorate

Identifiers
| CAS Number | 13498-07-2 |
| 3D model (JSmol) | Interactive image |
| ChemSpider | 11233420 |
| ECHA InfoCard | 100.033.460 |
| EC Number | 236-822-3 |
| PubChem CID | 13783608 |
| UN number | 3098 |
- InChI: InChI=1S/3ClHO4.Pr/c3*2-1(3,4)5;/h3*(H,2,3,4,5);/q;;;+3/p-3 Key: OPAITELCMCAYEB-UHFFFAOYSA-K
- SMILES: [O-]Cl(=O)(=O)=O.[O-]Cl(=O)(=O)=O.[O-]Cl(=O)(=O)=O.[Pr+3]

Properties
| Chemical formula | Pr(ClO_{4})_{3} |
| Molar mass | 439.259 |
| Density | 1.563 |
- Melting point
| Vapor pressure | 0.21 psi (20 °C) |

Hazards
- GHS labelling
| Pictograms | (GHS03: Oxidizing) (GHS07: Exclamation mark) |
| Signal word | Danger |
| Hazard statements | H272, H315, H319, H335 |
| Precautionary statements | P210, P220, P261, P264, P264+P265, P271, P280, P302+P352, P304+P340, P305+P351+P338, P319, P321, P332+P317, P337+P317, P362+P364, P370+P378, P403+P233, P405, P501 |
- Except where otherwise noted, data are given for materials in their standard state (at 25 °C [77 °F], 100 kPa). Infobox references

Praseodymium(III) perchlorate is the perchlorate salt of praseodymium, with the chemical formula of Pr(ClO_{4})_{3}.

== Preparation ==
Praseodymium(III) perchlorate can be prepared from praseodymium(III,IV) oxide. Dissolving praseodymium(III,IV) oxide in a slight excess of hydrochloric acid and adding a small amount of hydrogen peroxide can prepare praseodymium perchlorate.

== Chemical properties ==
Praseodymium perchlorate can form two complexes with crown ether 18-crown-6 in stoichiometric ratios of 1:1 and 1:2., and can form complexes with L-proline, glutamic acid, mandelic acid, penicillamine. It can also form complexes with imidazole and alanine.
