= Sodium vanadate =

Sodium vanadate can refer to:

- Sodium metavanadate (sodium trioxovanadate(V)), NaVO_{3}
- Sodium orthovanadate (sodium tetraoxovanadate(V)), Na_{3}VO_{4}
- Sodium decavanadate, Na_{6}V_{10}O_{28}
- Barnesite, mineral of hydrous sodium vanadate
