= Peroxynitrous acid =

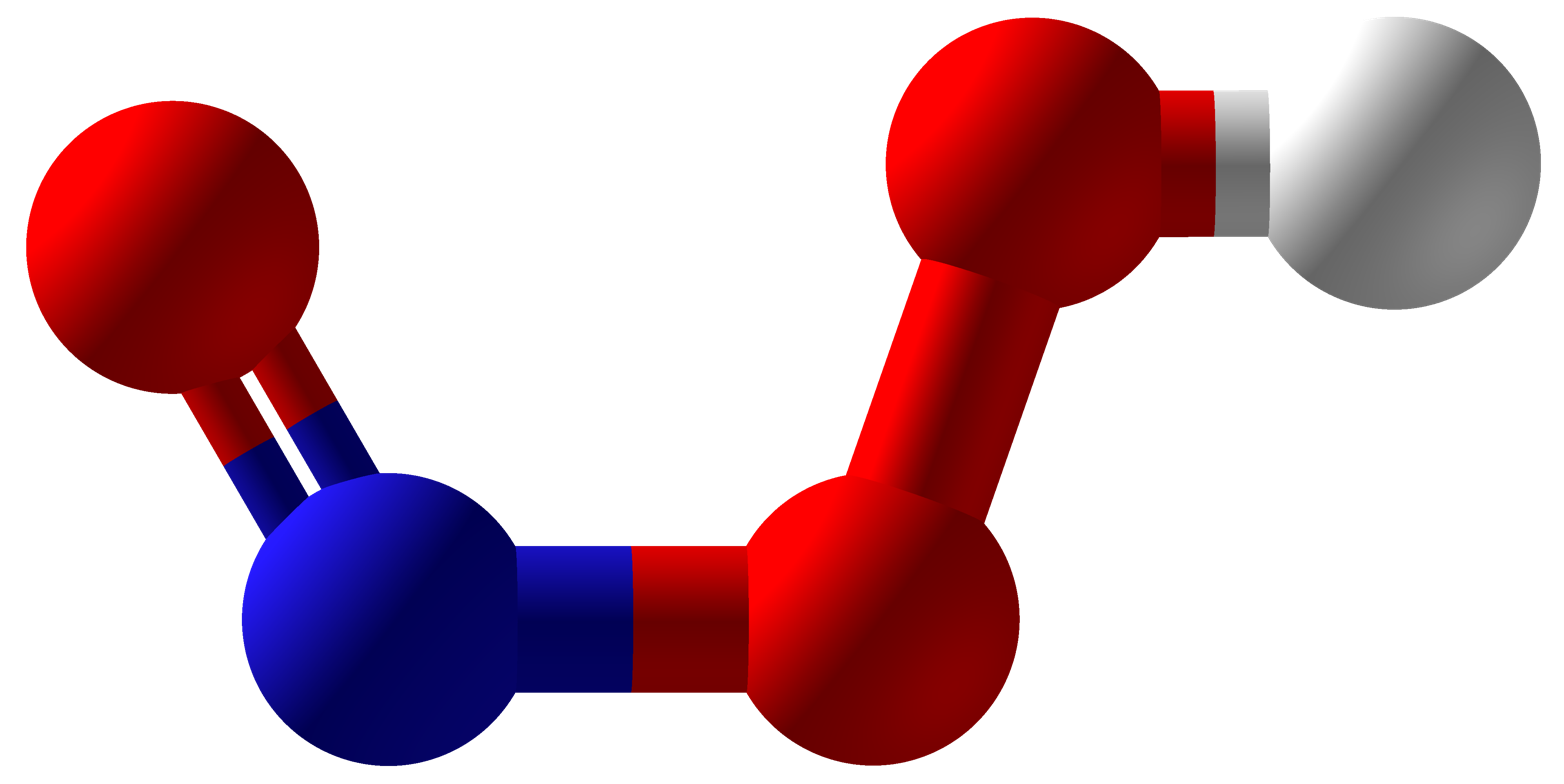

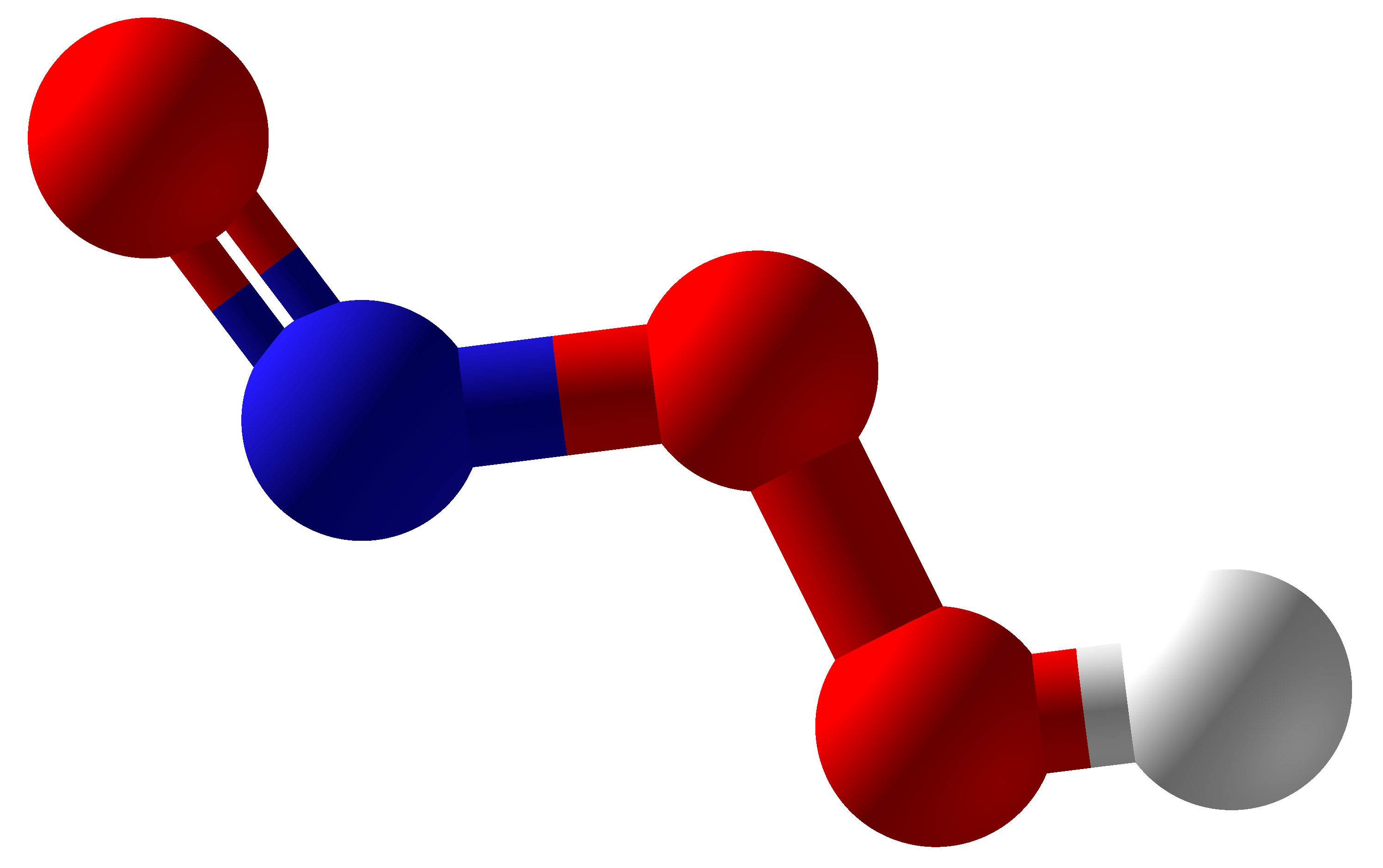

Names
- Preferred IUPAC name Peroxynitrous acid
- Systematic IUPAC name (Hydridodioxido)oxidonitrogen

Identifiers
| CAS Number | 14691-52-2 |
| 3D model (JSmol) | Interactive image |
| ChEBI | CHEBI:25942 |
| ChEMBL | ChEMBL1794794 |
| ChemSpider | 109951 |
| Gmelin Reference | 49207 |
| MeSH | Peroxynitrous+Acid |
| PubChem CID | 123349 |
| CompTox Dashboard (EPA) | DTXSID00163543 |
- InChI: InChI=1S/HNO3/c2-1-4-3/h3H Key: CMFNMSMUKZHDEY-UHFFFAOYSA-N
- SMILES: OON=O

Properties
| Chemical formula | NHO_{3} |
| Molar mass | 63.0128 g mol^{−1} |
| Conjugate base | Peroxynitrite |

Related compounds
| Related compounds | Nitroxyl; Nitrous acid; Nitrosyl bromide; Nitrosyl chloride; Nitrosyl fluoride |
- Except where otherwise noted, data are given for materials in their standard state (at 25 °C [77 °F], 100 kPa). Infobox references

Peroxynitrous acid (HNO_{3}) is a reactive nitrogen species (RNS). It is the conjugate acid of peroxynitrite (ONOO^{−}). It has a pK_{a} of approximately 6.8. It is formed in vivo from the diffusion-controlled reaction of nitrogen monoxide (ON^{•}) and superoxide (O^{•−}_{2}). It is an isomer of nitric acid and isomerises with a rate constant of k = 1.2 s^{−1}, a process whereby up to 5% of hydroxyl and nitrogen dioxide radicals may be formed. It oxidises and nitrates aromatic compounds in low yield. The mechanism may involve a complex between the aromatic compound and ONOOH, and a transition from the cis- to the trans-configuration of ONOOH. Peroxynitrous acid is also important in atmospheric chemistry.
