= Neodymium nitrate =

Inorganic chemical compound

Neodymium(III) nitrate
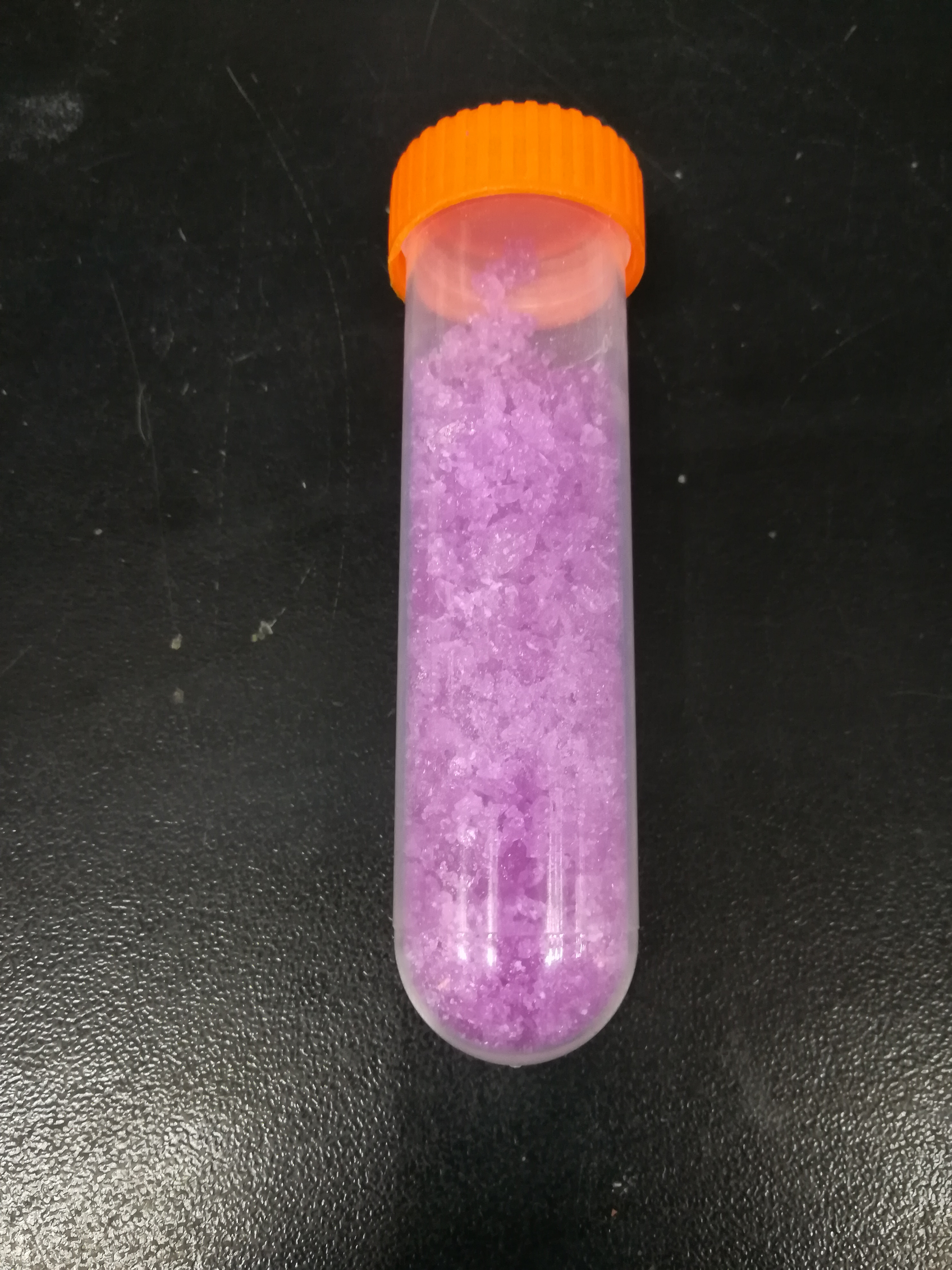

Names
- Other names Neodymium trinitrate

Identifiers
| CAS Number | 10045-95-1; hexahydrate: 16454-60-7 |
| 3D model (JSmol) | Interactive image; hexahydrate: Interactive image |
| ChemSpider | 9155614 |
| ECHA InfoCard | 100.030.127 |
| EC Number | 233-153-9 |
| PubChem CID | 204494 |
| CompTox Dashboard (EPA) | DTXSID30890638 |
- InChI: hexahydrate: InChI=1S/3NO3.Nd.6H2O/c3*2-1(3)4;;;;;;;/h;;;;6*1H2/q3*-1;+3;;;;;; Key: VQVDTKCSDUNYBO-UHFFFAOYSA-N
- SMILES: [N+](=O)([O-])[O-].[N+](=O)([O-])[O-].[N+](=O)([O-])[O-].[Nd+3]; hexahydrate: [N+](=O)([O-])[O-].[N+](=O)([O-])[O-].[N+](=O)([O-])[O-].O.O.O.O.O.O.[Nd+3]

Properties
| Chemical formula | Nd(NO_{3})_{3} (anhydrous); Nd(NO_{3})_{3}·6H_{2}O (hexahydrate) |
| Molar mass | 330.25 g⋅mol^{−1} (anhydrous); 438.34 g⋅mol^{−1} (hexahydrate) |
| Appearance | vibrant pink/violet solid |
| Density | 6.5 g/cm^{3} |
| Melting point | 55 °C (131 °F; 328 K) (hexahydrate, melts in water of crystallization) |

Structure
| Crystal structure | triclinic |
| Space group | P1̅ |
| Lattice constant | a = 9.307 Å, b = 11.747 Å, c = 6.776 Å α = 91.11°, β = 112.24°, γ = 109.15° Values are for [Nd(NO_{3})_{3}(H_{2}O)_{4}]·2H_{2}O. |
| Lattice volume (V) | 639.0 Å^{3} |
| Formula units (Z) | 2 |

Hazards
- GHS labelling
| Pictograms | (GHS03: Oxidizing) (GHS07: Exclamation mark) |
| Signal word | Warning |
| Hazard statements | H272, H315, H319, H335 |
| Precautionary statements | P210, P220, P221, P261, P264, P271, P280, P302+P352, P304+P340+P312, P305+P351+P338, P332+P313, P337+P313, P362, P370+P378, P403+P233, P405, P501 |
| NFPA 704 (fire diamond) | 0 0 0 OX |
- Lethal dose or concentration (LD, LC)
| LD_{50} (median dose) | 2750 mg/kg (oral, rat) |
- Except where otherwise noted, data are given for materials in their standard state (at 25 °C [77 °F], 100 kPa). Infobox references

Neodymium nitrate is an inorganic salt with the formula Nd(NO_{3})_{3}·x(H_{2}O). It is typically encountered as the hexahydrate, Nd(NO_{3})_{3}·6H_{2}O. It decomposes to NdONO_{3} at elevated temperature.

It is used in the extraction and purification of neodymium from its ores.

== Production and Preparation ==
Neodymium(III) nitrate can be obtained by the action of nitric acid on neodymium(III) carbonate or other neodymium salts of weak acids.
