= Disodium aurothiomalate =

Chemical compound

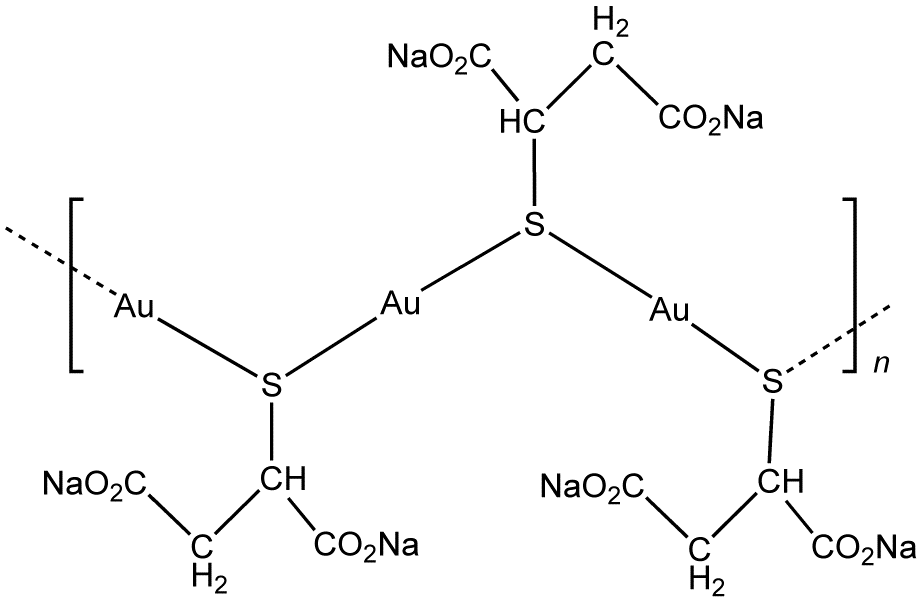

Clinical data
- Routes of administration: Intramuscular injection
- ATC code: monomer: none

Pharmacokinetic data
- Bioavailability: 0%
- Excretion: Renal, very slow

Identifiers
- CAS Number: monomer: 12244-57-4
- PubChem CID: monomer: 71443
- ChemSpider: monomer: 21241684.html : 21241684
- UNII: monomer: E4768ZY6GM
- CompTox Dashboard (EPA): monomer: DTXSID9048986
- ECHA InfoCard: 100.151.944

Chemical and physical data
- Formula: C_{4}H_{3}AuNa_{2}O_{4}S
- Molar mass: 390.07 g·mol^{−1}
- 3D model (JSmol): monomer: Interactive image; hexamer: Interactive image
- SMILES: monomer: [Na]OC(=O)CC(C(=O)O[Na])S[Au]; hexamer: [Na]OC(=O)CC(C(=O)O[Na])S[Au-][S+](C(C(=O)O[Na])C(C(=O)O[Na]))[Au-][S+](C(C(=O)O[Na])C(C(=O)O[Na]))[Au-][S+](C(C(=O)O[Na])C(C(=O)O[Na]))[Au-][S+](C(C(=O)O[Na])C(C(=O)O[Na]))[Au-][S+](C(C(=O)O[Na])C(C(=O)O[Na]))[Au]
- InChI: monomer: InChI=1S/C4H6O4S.Au.2Na/c5-3(6)1-2(9)4(7)8;;;/h2,9H,1H2,(H,5,6)(H,7,8);;;/q;3*+1/p-3; Key:VXIHRIQNJCRFQX-UHFFFAOYSA-K; hexamer: InChI=1S/C4H6O4S.Au.2Na.H2O/c5-3(6)1-2(9)4(7)8;;;;/h2,9H,1H2,(H,5,6)(H,7,8);;;;1H2/q;3*+1;/p-3; Key:YLQOAPBVYJCTPW-UHFFFAOYSA-K

Disodium aurothiomalate is a chemical compound with the formula AuSCH(CO_{2}Na)CH_{2}CO_{2}Na. In conjunction with its monoprotonated derivative, this coordination complex or closely related species are used to treat rheumatoid arthritis, under the tradename Myochrysine. The thiomalate is racemic in most formulation.

== Structure ==
Disodium aurothiomalate is a coordination polymer. The salt CSNa_{2}Au_{2}T(TH) salt (T = thiomalate^{3−}, TH = monoprotonated thiomalate^{2−}) is related to disodium aurothiomalate but is easier to crystallise and characterise by X-ray crystallography. The compound is polymeric with Au-S-Au-S^{...} chains with succinoyl groups attached to the sulfur atoms. The structure of the related drug Aurothioglucose is also polymeric with two-coordinate gold(I) centers. In such compounds, the efficacy results from the compound in solution, the structures of such solution species are often poorly understood. Medical texts sometimes suggest that free Au^{+} ions exist in this and related gold(I) compounds, but the Au-thiolate bonding is highly covalent and free gold ions do not exist in solution. Whereas simple gold thiolates are lipophilic, the carboxylate substituents render disodium aurothiomalate soluble in water.

Disodium aurothiomalate contains no Au-C bonds, so it is not an organometallic compound in the formal sense.

== Mechanism of action ==
The mechanism of action of disodium aurothiomalate is unknown.

== Side effects ==
Disodium aurothiomalate can cause photosensitive rashes, gastrointestinal disturbance, and kidney damage.

== See also ==
- Auranofin
- Aurothioglucose
- Aurotioprol
- Gold salts
- Sodium aurothiomalate
