= Jacques Forestier =

French rheumatologist (1890–1978)

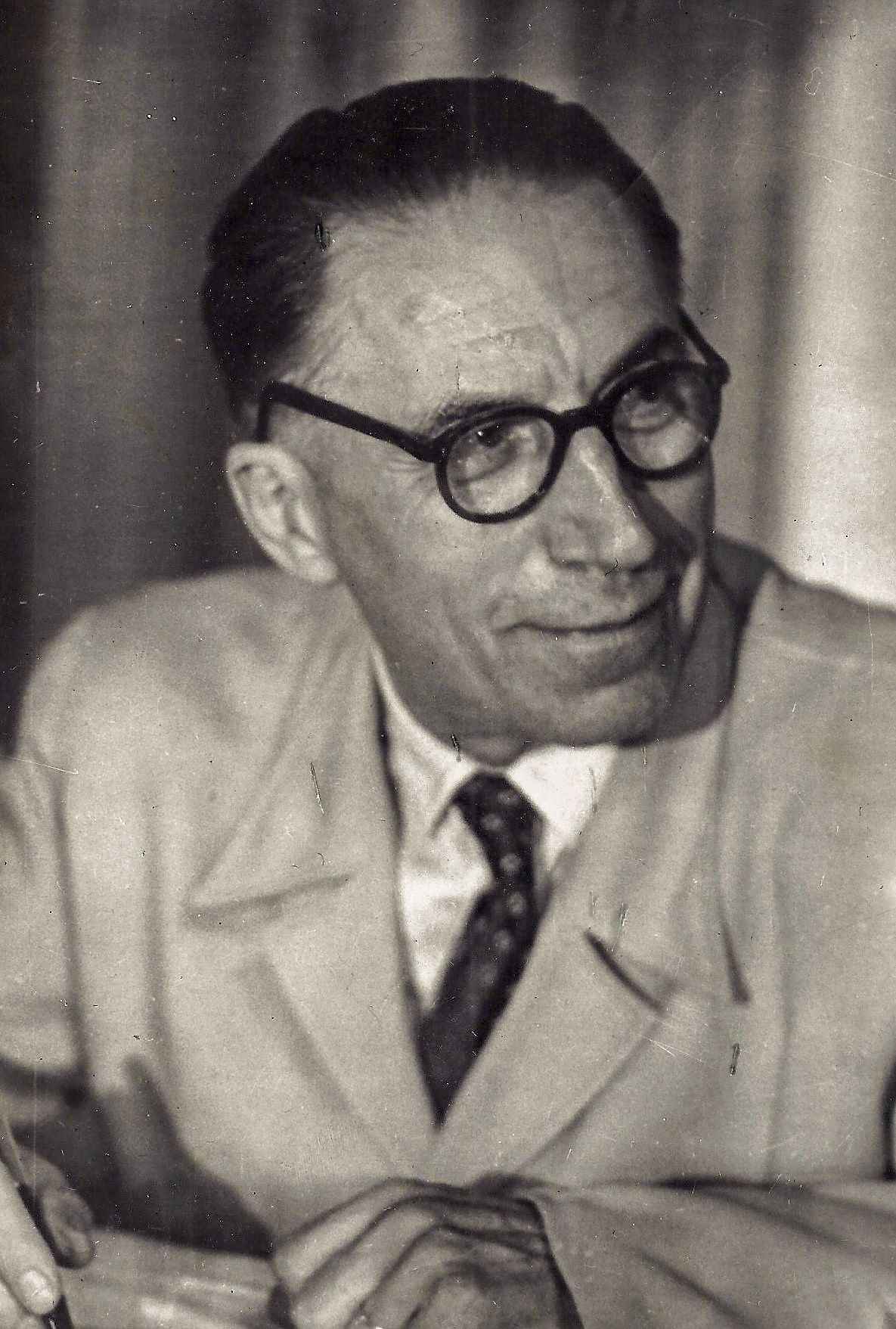

Personal information
- Born: 27 July 1890 Aix-les-Bains
- Died: 17 March 1978 (aged 87)
- Occupation: internist
Medal record
Men's Rugby union
Silver medal – second place	1920 Antwerp	Team

Jacques Forestier (27 July 1890, Aix-les-Bains – 17 March 1978) was a French internist who was a pioneer in the field of rheumatology.

Forestier studied medicine in Paris, later working at Hôpital Cochin, where he became interested in rheumatology and its treatment. In 1928 he took part in the founding of the French society of rheumatology. His father, Henri Forestier, was a director at the therapeutic spas in Aix-les-Bains.

Forestier is remembered for his introduction of gold salts as a remedy for rheumatoid arthritis. Historically, injectable gold salts such as gold sodium thiomalate and aurothioglucose were considered by many to be the most effective treatment for rheumatoid arthritis prior to the advent of targeted therapeutics. Forestier is also known for his work with polymyalgia rheumatica and diffuse idiopathic skeletal hyperostosis.

With his instructor, Jean-Athanase Sicard (1872–1929), he demonstrated the use of Lipiodol for spinal X-ray examinations.

== Personal life ==
In 1922, he married Adrienne Chapuis. They have seven children. He died on 17 March 1978 in Paris. He is buried in the cemetery of the Place Maurice Mollard in Aix-les-Bains, his grave is in section 1A, aisle 15, n°128.

== Olympics ==
Forestier competed in the 1920 Summer Olympics as rugby union player for France. As a member of the French team, he won the silver medal.

== Associated eponyms ==
- "Forestier's disease": also known as diffuse idiopathic skeletal hyperostosis (DISH). It is a type of degenerative spinal arthritis found in the elderly.
- "Forestier's bowstring sign" (signe de la corde de l'arc); a sign seen in ankylosing spondylitis (AS).
- "Forestier-Certonciny syndrome": also referred to as "pseudo-polyarthrite rhizomélique" or as polymyalgia rheumatica. Published in an article titled, Pseudopolyarthrite rhizomelique; in Revue du rhumatisme et des maladies osteo-articulaires, Paris, 1953, 20: 854–862.

== Selected writings ==
- Méthode radiographique d’exploration de la cavité épidurale par la lipiodol. Written with Jean Athanase Sicard (1872–1929). (Lipide (iodised oil) first used in radiology).
- L’exploration radiologique des cavités broncho-pulmonaires par les injections intra-trachéales d’huile iodée, (with Jean-Athanase Sicard).
- L'aurothérapie dans les rhumatismes chroniques (Introduction of gold therapy).
