= Cognitive dysfunction syndrome =

Cognitive dysfunction syndrome (CDS) may refer to:

- Canine cognitive dysfunction
- Feline cognitive dysfunction

== See also ==
- Alzheimer's disease, a similar disease in humans
