= Cat cognitive support diets =

In general, cognitive support diets are formulated to include nutrients that have a known role in brain development, function and/or maintenance, with the goal of improving and preserving mental processes such as attentiveness, short-term and long-term memory, learning, and problem solving. Currently, there is very little conclusive research available regarding cat cognition as standardized tests for evaluating cognitive ability are less established and less reliable than cognitive testing apparatus used in other mammalian species, like dogs. Much of what is known about feline cognition has been inferred from a combination of owner-reported behaviour, brain necropsies, and comparative cognitive neurology of related animal models. Cognition claims appear primarily on kitten diets which include elevated levels of nutrients associated with optimal brain development, although there are now diets available for senior cats that include nutrients to help slow the progression of age-related changes and prevent cognitive decline. Cognition diets for cats contain a greater portion of omega-3 fatty acids, especially docosahexaenoic acid (DHA) as well as eicosapentaenoic acid (EPA), and usually feature a variety of antioxidants and other supporting nutrients thought to have positive effects on cognition.

== Omega-3 fatty acids ==
The omega-3 fatty acids are a key nutrient in cognition for felines. They are essential for felines as they cannot be synthesized naturally and must be obtained from the diet. Omega-3 fatty acids that support brain development and function are alpha-linolenic acid, docosahexaenoic acid (DHA) and eicosapentaenoic acid (EPA). Fish oils, fish and other marine sources provide a very rich source of DHA and EPA. Alpha-linolenic acid can be acquired from oils and seeds.

In kittens and juvenile felines, omega-3 fatty acids are very important for the development of the brain, components of the nervous system and retinal accretion. It was found in a study by Pawlosky et al. (1997), when pregnant domestic felines were fed a diet high in omega-3 fatty acids that their offspring showed high levels of DHA in brain and retinal tissues. In the group that fed low concentrations of omega-3 fatty acid and omega-6 fatty acid, their kittens had extremely low amounts of DHA in these tissues which shows that young felines, have poor biosynthetic ability to produce these fatty acids. This study also showed hindered brain waves in kittens whose mother were fed low omega-3 and omega-6 diets which is a significant indicator, that these fatty acids aid in the development of the feline brain at a juvenile stage.

Though young felines are not efficient at producing omega-3 fatty acids naturally, it is critical for cognitive function and brain development in regard to brain waves and glucose uptake. Felines, like other obligate carnivores, possess a small concentration of delta 6 desaturase which is an enzyme that converts omega-3 fatty acids such as alpha linolenic acid into DHA. This is what causes the poor bioavailability of essential fatty acids in felines, and why it is crucial in their diet.

Omega-3 fatty acid also aids in uptake of glucose in the brain which is needed for energy for cognitive health. Though no studies in cats have been completed, it was found that rats with low levels of omega-3 fatty acids resulted in a decrease of glucose uptake in the brain.

Recommended DHA and EPA concentrations have not been yet determined for cats in present day. According to AAFCO Dog and Cat Food Nutrient Profiles (2014), DHA and EPA the minimum amount for the growth and reproduction in cat food is 0.0012% on a dry matter basis or 0.03g per 1000 kcal ME per day. Alpha-linolenic acid, was recommended at 0.02% on a dry matter basis and 0.05g per 1000 kcal ME per day.

== Omega-6 fatty acids ==
Omega-6 fatty acids are also needed in feline cognition diets. The important omega-6 fatty acid that plays a role in brain support and cognition is arachidonic acid. Arachidonic acid or AA is found in animal sources such as meat and eggs. AA is required in cat diets, as felines convert insignificant amounts of it from linoleic acid due to the limited delta-6 desaturase. Like DHA, arachidonic acid is often found in the brain tissues of cats and seems to have a supporting role in brain function. In a 2000 study completed by Contreras et al., it was found that DHA and AA made up 20% of the fatty acids in the mammalian brain. Arachidonic acid makes up high amounts in the membrane of most cells and has many pro-inflammatory actions.

Recommended arachidonic acid concentrations have not been yet determined for cats in present-day but minimum requirements have been established. According to AAFCO Dog and Cat Food Nutrient Profiles (2014), the minimum amount of AA for the growth and reproduction in cat food is 0.02% on a dry matter basis or 0.05g per 1000 kcal ME per day. The minimum of adult maintenance in cats is 0.02% on a dry matter basis or 0.05g per 1000 kcal ME per day.

== Taurine ==
Taurine is an amino acid, which is essential in cat diets due to their low capacity to synthesize it. Because of taurine has the ability to cross the blood–brain barrier in the brain, it has been found to have a role in many neurological functions, especially in the visual development. Without taurine, felines can have an abnormal morphology in the cerebellum and visual cortex. When cats were fed a diet deficient in taurine, this leads to a decrease in the concentration of taurine in the retina of the eye. This results in deterioration of the photoreceptors, followed by complete blindness.

Based on AAFCO Dog and Cat Food Nutrient Profiles (2014), the minimum amount of taurine for the growth and reproduction in cat food is 0.10% (extruded) and 0.20% (canned) on a dry matter basis and 0.25g (extruded) and 0.50g (canned) per 1000 kcal ME per day. For minimum adult maintenance, taurine is recommended at 0.10% (extruded) and 0.20% (canned) on a dry matter basis and 0.25g (extruded) and 0.50g (canned) per 1000 kcal ME per day.

== Vitamins ==
=== Vitamin B ===
There are eight water-soluble B vitamins: thiamine (B1), h riboflavin (B2), niacin (B3), pantothenic acid (B5), pyridoxine (B6), biotin (B7), folate (B9) and cobolamin (B12), all of which play a direct or indirect role in energy metabolism and cellular functions. The role of each vitamin in mammalian cognitive processes has been well researched, and due to similar deficiency symptoms across species, it is generally accepted that the B vitamins have similar functions in analogous mammalian brains. It has been found that cats fed supporting nutrients, including B vitamins, saw significantly greater cognitive benefits than cats fed only to meet the minimum requirement.

==== Thiamine (B1) ====
Thiamine serves several indispensable roles in the brain that affect cognitive function either directly or indirectly. It is a functional component of neuronal and microglial cell membranes, and serves as a modulator of the acetylcholine neurotransmitter system. Thiamine indirectly drives cognitive processes as a necessary cofactor in the pathways needed to synthesise fatty acids, steroid hormones, nucleic acids and precursory molecules for various compounds involved in brain function. It has been shown that cats suffer irreversible brain damage when deprived of thiamine that hinders memory and learning even after thiamine has been reintroduced to the diet.

==== Riboflavin (B2) ====
Riboflavin molecules are required to produce flavoprotein coenzymes, which are the rate limiting component of several important biological processes required for optimal cognitive function. Flavoproteins drive reactions for the synthesis of proteins involved with electron transport, oxygen transport, vasodilation and the other b vitamins niacin, folate and cobalamin. Riboflavin also exhibits powerful antioxidant effects through its role in the glutathione redox cycle, particularly with regard to protection against lipid peroxidation, which is associated with brain aging and cognitive disorders.

==== Pantothenic acid (B5) ====
Pantothenic acid is precursory to biosynthesis of coenzyme A (CoA), which is not only required for cellular respiration, but also serves a role in the synthesis of structural and functional brain cell components such as cholesterol, amino acids, fatty acids and phospholipids. Vitamin B5 also plays a more direct role in cognitive function by participating in the synthesis of steroid hormones and neurotransmitters.

==== Pyridoxine (B6) ====
Pyridoxine is an indispensable cofactor in the synthesis of the neurotransmitters serotonin, melatonin, dopamine, gama-aminobutyric acid, adrenaline and noradrenaline, and even slight deficiencies can lead to cognitive impairments in humans. Pyridoxine deficiencies have been linked to abnormal sleep and behaviour patterns through downregulation of neurotransmitters and secretion of regulatory hormones in the hypothalamus and pituitary.

=== Vitamin A ===
Vitamin A is a fat soluble vitamin that occurs in three forms; retinol, retinal, and retinoic acid. It is most well known for retinol's imperative role in ensuring normal vision in mammals however retinoic acid is important in altering the expression of genes through nuclear receptors. The precursors for vitamin A are beta-carotenes which get converted to vitamin A, predominantly in the liver. Cats rely on preformed vitamin A in the diet as they are unable to carry out the conversion of beta-carotenes to vitamin A.

Vitamin A recommendations are 6668 IU/kg for a feline in a growing or reproductive state and 3332 IU/kg for adult maintenance. A maximum vitamin A intake of 333,300 IU/kg has been implemented to ensure toxicity doesn't occur. Chronic vitamin A toxicity in felines is distinguished by the prevalence of new bone formation on already formed bone, specifically on the cervical vertebrae. This can cause stiffening of the joints, deformities as well as crippling within cats.

=== Vitamin E ===
Vitamin E is a fat soluble vitamin that plays an important role in the formation of cell membranes, cell respiration, and metabolism of fats. It is an antioxidant meaning it protects cells from oxidation. Natural sources of Vitamin E are primarily plant based and therefore cat diets with high amounts of raw protein, such as fish, need to be supplemented with Vitamin E. Vitamin E deficiencies have been well documented in both cats and dogs. Deficiencies of Vitamin E will result in cell damage and death in skeletal muscle, heart, testes, liver, and nerves. Inadequate Vitamin E can affect cells in the eye, making it one of the causes of retinal degeneration. It is essential to ensure the cat has a good quality of life to keep the cells of these organs alive and functioning.

Steatitis or "yellow fat disease" has been noted when sources of highly unsaturated fatty acids (e.g., tuna fish oil, cod liver oil, and unrefined herring oil) have been provided in feline diets without the proper amounts of supplemental Vitamin E. There is no known vitamin E toxicity level in cats.

Supplementation of vitamin E gives evidence for an improvement in an aging cat's functional lifespan. This refers to improvements in aspects of both physiology and brain health.

As the brain ages, a natural decline in the normal antioxidant defense mechanisms result in the increased the vulnerability of the brain to the deleterious effects of oxidative damage caused by reactive oxygen species (ROS).

The recommended minimum amount for both growth and reproduction diets and maintenance diets is 40 IU/kg.

== Choline and L-carnitine ==
Choline is a water-soluble nutrient that prevents and improves epilepsy and cognitive disorders. Supplementation is part of therapy for cats with seizures and kitty Alzheimer's, despite this treatment being mostly based on anecdotal evidence and research done on dogs. It is the precursor to nerve chemicals like dopamine and acetylcholine, making it important for proper functioning of the nervous system. It also assists in the absorption of L-carnitine from the GI tract in rats, guinea pigs, and humans, although this has not been studied in cats specifically. L-carnitine is a quaternary ammonium compound that transports long-chain fatty acids from the cytoplasm into the matrix of mitochondria to be oxidized for energy production, including mitochondria in the brain. Tanaka et al. (2004) studied rats since they are frequently used as models for mammalian physiology, and found that L-carnitine in the cerebral cortex of rats decreases with age. This indicates that supplementation of choline in seniors is particularly important to improve the uptake of L-carnitine, but further research using cats specifically has not been done.

Choline is often supplemented in cat diets in the form of choline chloride, but is also found in eggs, liver, chicken, and soya as phosphatidylcholine. Free choline is in vegetables like cauliflower and dark leafy greens, and the choline metabolite betaine is found in beets and lecithin. The recommended minimum amount for both growth and reproduction diets and maintenance diets is 2400 mg/kg.

=== Folate (B9) and Cobolamin (B12) ===
Folate (aka Folic Acid) and Cobolamin are often grouped together, as vitamin B12 is made essential due to its role in cleaving methyltetrahydrofolate molecules to release active folate, without which a functional folate deficiency occurs [5]. Folate is required for the folate cycle, so deficiency prompts the down-regulation of nucleic acid production, consequently limiting DNA synthesis, and impairs DNA methylation reactions, leaving brain tissues vulnerable to damage [5]. Folate and cobolamin are also involved in the methionine cycle, which is responsible for methylation of the potentially neurotoxic amino acid homocysteine, converting it back into methionine [9]. In the face of a true or functional folate deficiency, homocysteine molecules circulate the blood, which are thought to accelerate brain aging and increase risk of cognitive disorders [5].

== Supporting antioxidants ==
Zinc and copper are co-factors for superoxide dismutase to form Cu-Zn-SOD, an antioxidant enzyme that catalyzes the breakdown of superoxide radical into normal oxygen molecules or hydrogen peroxide by adding or removing an electron. A study by Webb et al. (2008) showed that increased SOD reduced oxidative stress and improved immunity in felines with FIV. The recommended minimum amount of zinc for growth and reproduction diets is 75 mg/kg, and is the same for maintenance diets. 15 mg/kg of copper is recommended as a minimum for extruded growth and reproduction diets, and is 8.4 mg/kg for canned diets. 5 mg/kg is recommended for maintenance diets regardless of food format.

Manganese functions as a co-factor for another form of superoxide dismutase (Mn-SOD) that is only found within mitochondria, including those in the brain. For growth and reproduction diets and maintenance diets, a minimum of 7.6 mg/kg of manganese is recommended.

Selenium is a major component of glutathione peroxidase. Glutathione peroxidases make up an enzyme family who reduce lipid hydroperoxides to their respective alcohols, and reduce free hydrogen peroxide to water to remove reactive oxygen species. They rely on the presence of selenium to fulfill their oxidative function. A minimum of 0.3 mg/kg of selenium is recommended for growth and reproduction diets and maintenance diets.

== Cognitive nutritional deficiencies ==
=== Central retinal degeneration ===
Central retinal deficiency is a cognitive dysfunction in cats that primarily caused by a nutritional deficiency but can be hereditary as well. However, because of improved nutritional health in recent years, the incidence of hereditary cases of this disease are seen less frequently.

The retina, a thin layer of tissue in the back of the eye, is the structure affected by this disorder. This structure receives the light gathered and focused from the lens. It essentially take light and converts it into electrical nerve signals that the brain interprets as vision. The retina contains rods and cones which are photo-receptors that help the animal see (rods) and see certain colours (cones).

Retinal degeneration can be caused by a taurine deficiency, which is why many cat foods are supplemented with taurine. Central retinal deficiency is irreversible but its effects can be significantly hindered by a diet supplemented with adequate amounts of taurine. Vitamin deficiencies in A and E can also lead to retinal degeneration in cats. Since photo-receptors develop early in life, it is critical that kittens are provided a diet which are supplemented with an appropriate amount of taurine and vitamins to promote proper development.

=== Cognitive Dysfunction Syndrome ===
Cognitive dysfunction syndrome (CDS), seen in both cats and dogs, is a progressive decline of cognitive abilities and subsequent behavioral changes associated with age-related pathologies more severe than would be expected in a healthy aging brain. CDS in cats is characterized by any combination of common, owner-reported behavioural changes associated with cognitive decline, such as increased attention seeking or aggression, disorientation and/or house-soiling, excessive meowing (often at night), altered sleep patterns, increased or decreased appetite, and increased or decreased activity.

The challenges of evaluating and tracking cognitive function in cats has led to very few trials investigating the effect of nutritional intervention on feline cognition, so as a result, many of the nutrients recommended to support cat cognition have been interpreted from human and canine cognitive support supplements.

Reactive oxygen species, free radicals, are a primary cause of neurological damage in aged brains, due to the high rate of metabolic activity, high lipid content and limited regenerative capacity of the brain. It is recommended that for cognitive support as they age, senior cats receive a diet supplemented with anti-oxidants to prevent lipid peroxidation, omega-3 fatty acids EPA and DHA to support lipid membranes of brain cells and reduce inflammation, L-carnitine to aid mitochondrial efficiency, choline to support neurotransmission where neuron atrophy has occurred, and B vitamins, especially vitamin B12 and folic acid due to their role in the methionine cycle.
