= Jean Garel =

French physician and laryngologist (1852-1931)

- Born: 28 March 1852; Lyon, France
- Died: 1931 (aged 78–79)
- Occupation: French physician

Jean Garel (28 March 1852–1931) was a French physician who specialised in the field of laryngology.

In 1879 he succeeded Léon Bouveret as chef de clinique médicale to the Faculté de médecine at Lyon. In 1881 he became a titular member of the Société des sciences médicales in Lyon. His name is associated with "Garel's sign", a medical sign involving dysphagia located in the tonsils and posterior fauces, if persistent for more than three weeks, it is usually of syphilitic origin.

== Selected works ==
- Note sur un nouveau cas de névrome plexiforme (Lu à la Société des sciences médicales de Lyon), (1877); Note on a new case of plexiform neuroma.
- Recherches cliniques et statistiques sur la valeur de l'asymétrie faciale dans le diagnostic de l'épilepsie, (1878); Clinical research and statistics on the value of facial asymmetry in the diagnosis of epilepsy.
- De la Gymnastique vocale dans le traitement de la voix eunuchoïde et de l'aphonie hystérique, (1887); Voice therapy in the treatment of eunuchoid voice and hysterical aphonia,
- Atlas stéréoscopique d'anatomie du nez et du larynx (anatomie normale et pathologique), (1897, with Frédéric Justin Collet); Stereoscopic atlas of anatomy of the nose and larynx (normal and pathological anatomy).
- Diagnostic et traitement des maladies du nez, "rhinoscopie", (1897); Diagnostics and treatment of maladies of the nose (rhinoscopy).
