= Crosstalk (biology) =

Biological crosstalk refers to instances in which one or more components of one signal transduction pathway affects another. This can be achieved through a number of ways with the most common form being crosstalk between proteins of signaling cascades. In these signal transduction pathways, there are often shared components that can interact with either pathway. A more complex instance of crosstalk can be observed with transmembrane crosstalk between the extracellular matrix (ECM) and the cytoskeleton.

== Crosstalk between signalling pathways ==
One example of crosstalk between proteins in a signalling pathway can be seen with cyclic adenosine monophosphate's (cAMP) role in regulating cell proliferation by interacting with the mitogen-activated protein (MAP) kinase pathway. cAMP is a compound synthesized in cells by adenylate cyclase in response to a variety of extracellular signals. cAMP primarily acts as an intracellular second messenger whose major intracellular receptor is the cAMP-dependent protein kinase (PKA) that acts through the phosphorylation of target proteins. The signal transduction pathway begins with ligand-receptor interactions extracellularly. This signal is then transduced through the membrane, stimulating adenylyl cyclase on the inner membrane surface to catalyze the conversion of ATP to cAMP.

ERK, a participating protein in the MAPK signaling pathway, can be activated or inhibited by cAMP. cAMP can inhibit ERKs in a variety of ways, most of which involve the cAMP-dependent protein kinase (PKA) and the inhibition of Ras-dependent signals to Raf-1. However, cAMP can also stimulate cell proliferation by stimulating ERKs. This occurs through the induction of specific genes via phosphorylation of the transcription factor CREB by PKA. Though ERKs do not appear to be a requirement for this phosphorylation of CREB, the MAPK pathway does play into crosstalk again, as ERKs are required to phosphorylate proteins downstream of CREB. Other known examples of the requirement of ERKs for cAMP-induced transcriptional effects include induction of the prolactin gene in pituitary cells, and of the dopamine beta-hydroxylate gene in pheochromocytomal cells (PC12). A number of diverse mechanisms exist by which cAMP can influence ERK signaling. Most mechanisms involving cAMP inhibition of ERKs uncouple Raf-1 from Ras activation through direct interaction of PKA with Raf-1 or indirectly through PKA interaction with the GTPase Rap1 (see figure 1). PKA may also negatively regulate ERKs by the activation of PTPases. Mechanisms for the activation of ERKs by cAMP are even more varied, usually including Rap1 or Ras, and even cAMP directly.

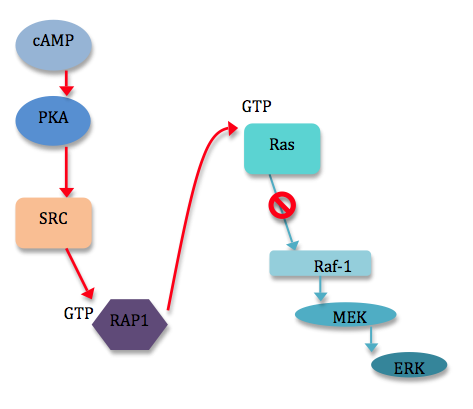
Figure 1: a possible mechanism of cAMP/PKA inhibition of ERK activation (MAPK pathway). cAMP activation of PKA activates Rap1 via Src. Rap1 then phosphorylates Ras and inhibits signaling to Raf-1.

== Transmembrane crosstalk ==
Crosstalk can even be observed across membranes. Membrane interactions with the extracellular matrix (ECM) and with neighboring cells can trigger a variety of responses within the cell. However, the topography and mechanical properties of the ECM also come to play an important role in powerful, complex crosstalk with the cells growing on or inside the matrix. For example, integrin-mediated cytoskeleton assembly and even cell motility are affected by the physical state of the ECM. Binding of the α5β1 integrin to its ligand (fibronectin) activates the formation of fibrillar adhesions and actin filaments. Yet, if the ECM is immobilized, matrix reorganization of this kind and formation of fibrillar adhesions is inhibited. In turn, binding of the same integrin (α5β1) to an immobilized fibronectin ligand is seen to form highly phosphorylated focal contacts/focal adhesion (cells involved in matrix adhesion) within the membrane and reduces cell migration rates In another example of crosstalk, this change in the composition of focal contacts in the cytoskeleton can be inhibited by members of yet another pathway: inhibitors of myosin light-chain kinases or Rho kinases, H-7 or ML-7, which reduce cell contractility and consequently motility. (see figure 2).

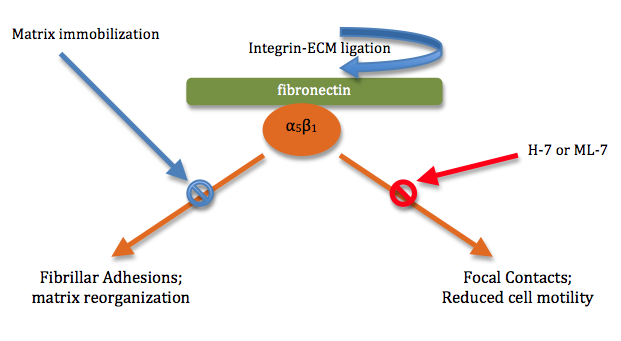
Figure 2: the matrix can play into other pathways inside the cell even through just its physical state. Matrix immobilization inhibits the formation of fibrillar adhesions and matrix reorganization. Likewise, players of other signaling pathways inside the cell can affect the structure of the cytoskeleton and thereby the cell's interaction with the ECM.

== Crosstalk in lymphocyte activation ==
A more complex, specific example of crosstalk between two major signaling pathways can be observed with the interaction of the cAMP and MAPK signaling pathways in the activation of lymphocytes. In this case, components of the cAMP pathway directly and indirectly affect MAPK signaling pathway meant to activate genes involving immunity and lymphocytes.

Newly formed cAMP is released from the membrane and diffuses across the intracellular space where it serves to activate PKA. The catalytic subunit of PKA must bind four molecules of cAMP to be activated, whereupon activation consists of cleavage between the regulatory and catalytic subunits. This cleavage in turn activates PKA by exposing the catalytic sites of the C subunits, which can then phosphorylate an array of proteins in the cell.

In lymphocytes, the intracellular levels of cAMP increase upon antigen-receptor stimulation and even more so in response to prostaglandin E and other immunosuppression agents. In this case, cAMP serves to inhibit immunity players. PKA type I colocalizes with the T-cell and B-cell antigen receptors and causes inhibition of T- and B-cell activation. PKA has even been highlighted as a direct inducer of genes contributing to immunosuppression.

Additionally, the cAMP pathway also interacts with the MAPK pathway in a more indirect manner through its interaction with hematopoietic PTPase (HePTP). HePTP is expressed in all leukocytes. When overexpressed in T-cells, HePTP reduces the transcriptional activation of the interleukin-2 promoter typically induced by the activated T-cell receptor through a MAPK signaling cascade. The way that HePTP effectively inhibits the MAPK signaling is by interacting with the MAP kinases Erk1, Erk2, and p38 through a short sequence in HePTP's non-catalytic N terminus termed the kinase interaction motif (KIM)., The highly-specific binding of Erk and p38 to this subunit of HePTP results in rapid inactivation of the signaling cascade (see figure 3).

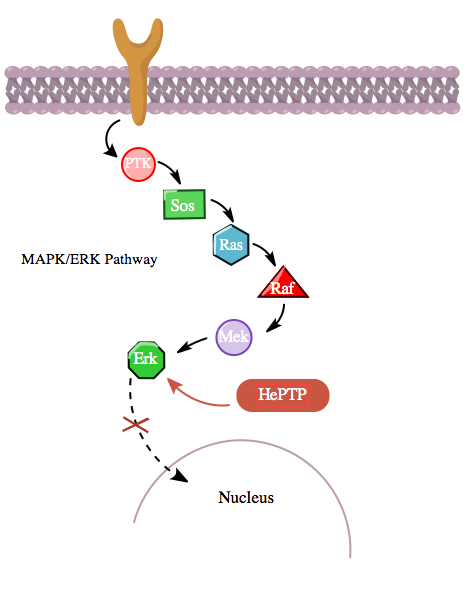
Figure 3: even without activation by a ligand bound to the receptor (R1), the MAPK pathway normally shows basal activity (at low levels). However, HePTP counteracts this activity.

Yet, since both HePTP and Erk are cytosolic enzymes, it is reasonable to conclude that there exists a mechanism for the inhibition of Erk by HePTP to cease in order to allow for the translocation of activated Erk to the nucleus. Indeed, like in many other cases of protein-protein interaction, HePTP appears to be phosphorylated by Erk and p38 at the sites Thr45 and Ser72. Importantly though, a third phosphorylation site in the non-catalytic N terminus (the KIM region) of HePTP has been found—one that is phosphorylated to a much higher stoichiometry by the cAMP pathway, in yet another instance of crosstalk between the cAMP and MAPK pathways.

Phosphorylation of this third site by PKAs from the cAMP pathway inhibits binding of MAP kinases to HePTP and thereby upregulates the MAPK/ERK signaling cascade. The MAPK pathway, through Ras, Raf, Mek, and Erk, shows low activity in the presence of unphosphorylated (active) HePTP. However, activation the cAMP pathway stimulates the activation of PKA, which in turn phosphorylates HePTP at Ser23. This prevents HePTP from binding to Erk and frees the MAPK pathway from inhibition, allowing downstream signaling to continue (see figure 4).

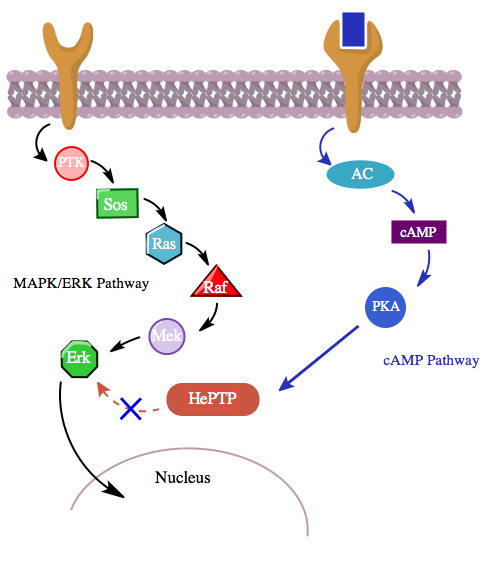
Figure 4: activation of the cAMP pathway by binding of ligand to its appropriate receptor (R2) leads to the activation of cAMP-dependent protein kinase (PKA) by adenylate cyclase (AC). This activated PKA then phosphorylates HePTP at Ser23, inhibiting its ability to bind to Erk and subsequently inhibit the MAPK pathway.

Moreover, studies involving smooth muscle cells from the atrium of the heart have shown that PKA can reduce the activation of MAP kinases in response to platelet-derived growth factor (PDGF) by phosphorylating the kinase c-Raf. Thus, it seems plausible that PKA in the cAMP pathway could even be further involved in the regulation of lymphocyte activation not only by inhibiting the antigen-receptor MAPK signal pathway at its final stage, but even further upstream.
