= Jean Sicard =

Jean Sicard can refer to:

- Jean Sicard (composer) (later 17th century – early 18th century), a French singer and composer of 17 books of airs
- Jean Sicard, known as Yann Brekilien (1920–2008), a Breton writer and member of the French Resistance
- Jean-Athanase Sicard (1872–1929), a French neurologist and radiologist
