= Crisdesalazine =

Experimental anti-inflammatory drug

Clinical data
- Trade names: GedaCure
- Other names: AAD-2004; AAD2004
- Drug class: Microsomal prostaglandin E2 synthase-1 (mPGES-1) inhibitor; Free radical scavenger

Identifiers
- IUPAC name: 2-hydroxy-5-[2-[4-(trifluoromethyl)phenyl]ethylamino]benzoic acid
- CAS Number: 927685-43-6
- PubChem CID: 16042343
- DrugBank: DB18405
- ChemSpider: 13170885
- UNII: 11VWK61J69

Chemical and physical data
- Formula: C_{16}H_{14}F_{3}NO_{3}
- Molar mass: 325.287 g·mol^{−1}
- 3D model (JSmol): Interactive image
- SMILES: C1=CC(=CC=C1CCNC2=CC(=C(C=C2)O)C(=O)O)C(F)(F)F
- InChI: InChI=1S/C16H14F3NO3/c17-16(18,19)11-3-1-10(2-4-11)7-8-20-12-5-6-14(21)13(9-12)15(22)23/h1-6,9,20-21H,7-8H2,(H,22,23); Key:UTMVACIBQLDZLP-UHFFFAOYSA-N

Crisdesalazine (INN; developmental code name AAD-2004) is a microsomal prostaglandin E2 synthase-1 (mPGES-1) inhibitor and free radical scavenger which is under development for the treatment of Alzheimer's disease, amyotrophic lateral sclerosis (ALS), depressive disorders, Parkinson's disease, and spinal muscular atrophy. It was also under development for the treatment of arthritis, diabetes, pain, and pancreatitis, but development for these indications was discontinued. Crisdesalazine is also approved under the brand name GedaCure for treatment of dogs with canine cognitive dysfunction.

== Background ==
The drug was derived from salicylic acids like mesalazine (5-aminosalicylate), aspirin (acetylsalicylate), and sulfasalazine. By inhibiting mPGES-1 (also known as prostaglandin E synthase (PTGES)), it blocks prostaglandin E2 production. Crisdesalazine is described as having a dual action, additionally acting as a direct free radical scavenger. Crisdesalazine is described as having anti-inflammatory, antioxidant, and neuroprotective effects. It seems to have potentially superior therapeutic effects compared to nonsteroidal anti-inflammatory drugs (NSAIDs; or cyclooxygenase inhibitors) like ibuprofen, for instance having better selectivity and safety.

As of February 2023, crisdesalazine is in phase 1 clinical trials for Alzheimer's disease, amyotrophic lateral sclerosis (ALS), depressive disorders, and Parkinson's disease and is in the preclinical stage of development for spinal muscular atrophy. It was first described in the scientific literature in 2012.

== See also ==
- List of investigational antidepressants
- List of investigational Parkinson's disease drugs
- Selegiline § Veterinary use
