= MPGES-2 =

Protein-coding gene in the species Homo sapiens

PTGES2
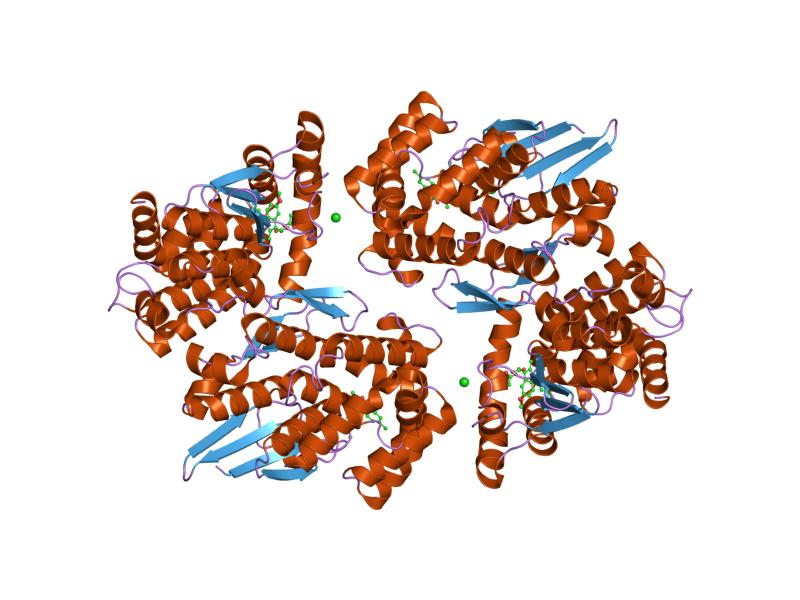

Identifiers
- Aliases: PTGES2, C9orf15, GBF-1, GBF1, PGES2, mPGES-2, prostaglandin E synthase 2
- External IDs: OMIM: 608152; MGI: 1917592; HomoloGene: 11819; GeneCards: PTGES2; OMA:PTGES2 - orthologs
- EC number: 5.3.99.3

Gene location (Human)
Chr.	Chromosome 9 (human)
Band	9q34.11	Start	128,120,693 bp
Band	9q34.11	End	128,128,462 bp

Gene location (Mouse)
Chr.	Chromosome 2 (mouse)
Band	2|2 B	Start	32,285,908 bp
Band	2|2 B	End	32,295,784 bp
RNA expression pattern
Bgee	Human / Mouse (ortholog); Top expressed in: apex of heart; gastrocnemius muscle; mucosa of transverse colon; left ventricle; right auricle of heart; right frontal lobe; prefrontal cortex; anterior cingulate cortex; muscle of thigh; left adrenal gland / Top expressed in: right kidney; muscle of thigh; proximal tubule; brown adipose tissue; granulocyte; neural layer of retina; soleus muscle; masseter muscle; dentate gyrus of hippocampal formation granule cell; interventricular septum; More reference expression data
BioGPS	n/a
Gene ontology
Molecular function	protein-disulfide reductase activity; DNA binding; glutathione binding; isomerase activity; protein binding; heme binding; lyase activity; electron transfer activity; prostaglandin-E synthase activity
Cellular component	cytoplasm; integral component of membrane; Golgi apparatus; membrane; Golgi membrane; mitochondrion; perinuclear region of cytoplasm; nucleus; extracellular region; cytosol; azurophil granule lumen
Biological process	prostaglandin metabolic process; lipid metabolism; cell redox homeostasis; fatty acid metabolic process; secretion; positive regulation of transcription, DNA-templated; fatty acid biosynthetic process; prostaglandin biosynthetic process; cyclooxygenase pathway; neutrophil degranulation; electron transport chain
Sources:Amigo / QuickGO
Orthologs
Species	Human	Mouse
Entrez	80142	96979
Ensembl	ENSG00000148334	ENSMUSG00000026820
UniProt	Q9H7Z7	Q8BWM0
RefSeq (mRNA)	NM_001256335; NM_025072; NM_198938; NM_198939; NM_198940	NM_133783
RefSeq (protein)	NP_001243264; NP_079348; NP_945176	NP_598544
Location (UCSC)	Chr 9: 128.12 – 128.13 Mb	Chr 2: 32.29 – 32.3 Mb
PubMed search
- Wikidata
View/Edit Human	View/Edit Mouse

Microsomal prostaglandin E synthase-2 (mPGES-2) or Prostaglandin E synthase 2 is an enzyme that in humans encoded by the PTGES2 gene located on chromosome 9. The protein encoded by this gene is a membrane-associated prostaglandin E synthase, which catalyzes the conversion of prostaglandin H2 to prostaglandin E2. This protein also has been shown to activate the transcription regulated by a gamma-interferon-activated transcription element (GATE). Multiple transcript variants have been found for this gene.

== Structure ==
Microsomal prostaglandin E synthase type-2 (mPTGES2) has been crystallized with an anti-inflammatory drug indomethacin (IMN). The N-terminal of mPTGES2 is attached to the lipid membrane and the two hydrophobic pockets connected to form a V shape are located in the bottom of a large cavity for IMN binding. The mPTGES2 exists in a dimer.

== Function ==
The gene encoding the PTGES2 protein contains 10 exons. The PTGE2 protein encoded by the gene is a 33-kDa membrane-associated prostaglandin E synthase that is thought to be targeted to the Golgi apparatus as well as the mitochondrion within the cell. Prostaglandin E synthase catalyzes the conversion of prostaglandin H2 to prostaglandin E2. The particular reaction catalyzed by PTGE2 is thought to be:

(5Z,13E)-(15S)-9-alpha,11-alpha-epidioxy-15-hydroxyprosta-5,13-dienoate = (5Z,13E)-(15S)-11-alpha,15-dihydroxy-9-oxoprosta-5,13-dienoate.

The PTGE2 protein functions in part of the prostaglandin synthesis pathway, which forms a component of the overall lipid synthesis mechanism in the human body. The activity of PTGES2 is thought to be increased in the presence of sulfhydryl compounds, in particular dithiothreitol.

The PTGE2 protein also has been shown to activate the transcription regulated by an interferon-gamma gamma-interferon-activated transcription element (GATE).

== Clinical significance ==
The excess production of prostaglandin E 2 is known to contribute to inflammatory diseases which includes rheumatoid arthritis, atherosclerosis, and cancer. Furthermore, naturally occurring polymorphisms of PTGES2 have been shown to be associated with increased risks for diabetes mellitus and metabolic syndromes.

As such, pharmacological inhibition of prostaglandin E 2 production by synthetic minor prenylated chalcones and flavonoids has potential therapeutic viability. It has been shown that the synthesis of prostaglandin E 2 in the endothelial cells of the brain is important for inflammation-induced fever. Additionally, investigators have observed elevations in cell doubling rates for several cancer cell types in the presence of prostaglandin E 2 –producing cell lines.
