= Thiomalic acid =

- D-Thiomalic acid

Names
- Preferred IUPAC name 2-Sulfanylbutanedioic acid
- Other names 2-Mercaptosuccinic acid

Identifiers
CAS Number	70-49-5
3D model (JSmol)	Interactive image
ChEBI	CHEBI:38705
ChemSpider	6032
ECHA InfoCard	100.000.670
EC Number	200-736-4
PubChem CID	6268
UNII	94239W5L4H
CompTox Dashboard (EPA)	DTXSID20861615
- InChI: InChI=1S/C4H6O4S/c5-3(6)1-2(9)4(7)8/h2,9H,1H2,(H,5,6)(H,7,8) Key: NJRXVEJTAYWCQJ-UHFFFAOYSA-N
- SMILES: C(C(C(=O)O)S)C(=O)O

Properties
Chemical formula	C_{4}H_{6}O_{4}S
Molar mass	150.15 g·mol^{−1}
Appearance	white solid
Melting point	151 to 154 °C (304 to 309 °F; 424 to 427 K)

Related compounds
Other anions	Thiomalate
- Except where otherwise noted, data are given for materials in their standard state (at 25 °C [77 °F], 100 kPa). verify (what is ?) Infobox references

Thiomalic acid or mercaptosuccinic acid is the organosulfur compound with the formula HO_{2}CCH(SH)CH_{2}CO_{2}H. It is a dicarboxylic acid containing a thiol functional group. As suggested by its name, it contains a thiol group (SH) in place of the hydroxy group (OH) in malic acid. Salts and esters are known as thiomalates. It is usually prepared by the addition of sulfur reagents (thiourea, hydrogen sulfide, etc.) to maleic anhydride. An enantioselective synthesis begins with aspartic acid via 2-bromosuccinic acid.

== Uses ==
Thiomalic acid is a precursor to several medicinals in addition to the pesticide malathion.

The sodium and gold salt of thiomalic acid, sodium aurothiomalate, is used as a pharmaceutical drug for the treatment of rheumatoid arthritis.

== Related compounds ==
- Dimercaptosuccinic acid
