= Raymond Tripier =

Raymond Tripier (1838–1916) was a French physician and pathologist.

From 1858 to 1862, he worked as interne des hôpitaux in Lyon, afterwards supporting his doctorate in Paris (1863) with a dissertation on spontaneous arterio-venous aneurysms of the aorta and superior vena cava, "De l'anéurysme artério-veineux spontané de l'aorte et de la veine cave supérieure". In 1866, he became médecin des hôpitaux in Lyon, and from 1884 to 1908, was chair of pathological anatomy to the Faculté de Médecine. He was a collector and patron of the arts, having an established friendship with sculptor Auguste Rodin. After retiring from teaching he devoted his time to museum work in Lyon.

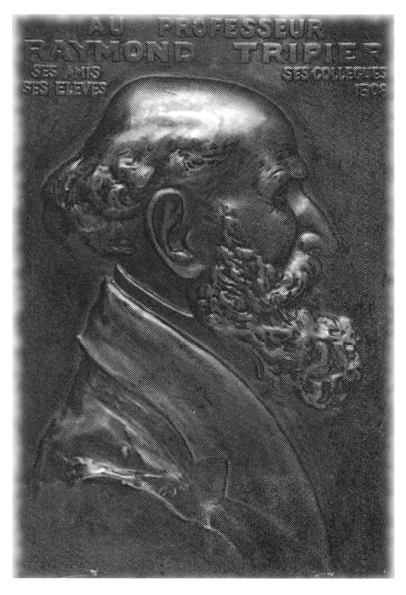
Albert Marque, Raymond Tripier, 1908, Medical Medal. Lyon, Museum of Fine Arts

== Written works ==
He is remembered for his studies of cardiovascular and respiratory diseases, Etudes anatomo-cliniques; coeur, vaisseaux, poumons (Anatomo-clinical studies of the heart, vessels and lungs, 1909). Another principal work of his was a treatise on pathological anatomy titled Traité d’Anatomie Pathologique Générale (1904). Other noted writings by Tripier include:

- La fiévre typhoide traitée par les bains froids, with Léon Bouveret, 1886 (Typhoid fever: treatment by cold baths).
- Die Kaltwasserbehandlung des Typhus, with Léon Bouveret, 1889
- Rôle de la péritonite sous-hépatique dans la pathogenie des hernies abdominales, with Jean Paviot, 1909 (Role of subhepatic peritonitis in the pathogenesis of abdominal hernias).
- Instinct et intelligence comme fonction synthétique de l'organisme humain pour sa conservation applications pratiques aux diverses phases de l'existence, 1911 (Instinct and intelligence: a synthetic function of the human organism for its preservation: practical applications in various phases of life).
- Considérations pratiques sur l'art, les artistes, les musées: peinture et sculpture, 1913.
