= Chrysiasis =

- Specialty: Dermatology

Chrysiasis is a dermatological condition induced by the parenteral administration of gold salts, usually for the treatment of rheumatoid arthritis. Such treatment has been superseded as the best practice for treating the disease because of "numerous side effects and monitoring requirements, their limited efficacy, and very slow onset of action".

Similar to silver, a gold preparation used parenterally for a long period may rarely produce a permanent skin pigmentation – especially if the skin is exposed to sunlight or artificial ultraviolet radiation.

The skin's pigmentation (in this condition) has been described as uniformly gray, grayish purple, slate gray, or grayish blue, and is usually limited to exposed portions of the body. It may involve the conjunctivae over the scleras but usually not the oral mucosa. Location of pigment predominantly in the upper dermis leads to the blue component of skin color through the scattering phenomenon. It is much less likely to be deposited in the nails and hair.

Chrysiasis was said to have been much more common when medicines containing traces of gold were used for treatment of tuberculosis (commonplace forms of treatment nearly fifty years ago). Treatments containing gold traces were also used to treat cases of rheumatoid arthritis – but because the dose used for tuberculosis was higher than for arthritis, it has not afflicted many subscribing to such treatments.

Gold can be identified in the skin chemically by light microscopy, electron microscopy, and spectroscopy.

There is no way to reverse or treat chrysiasis.

== See also ==
- Colloidal gold
- Gold salts
- Gold toxicity
- Skin lesion
