= Gold-containing drugs =

Pharmaceuticals that contain gold

Sodium aurothiomalate

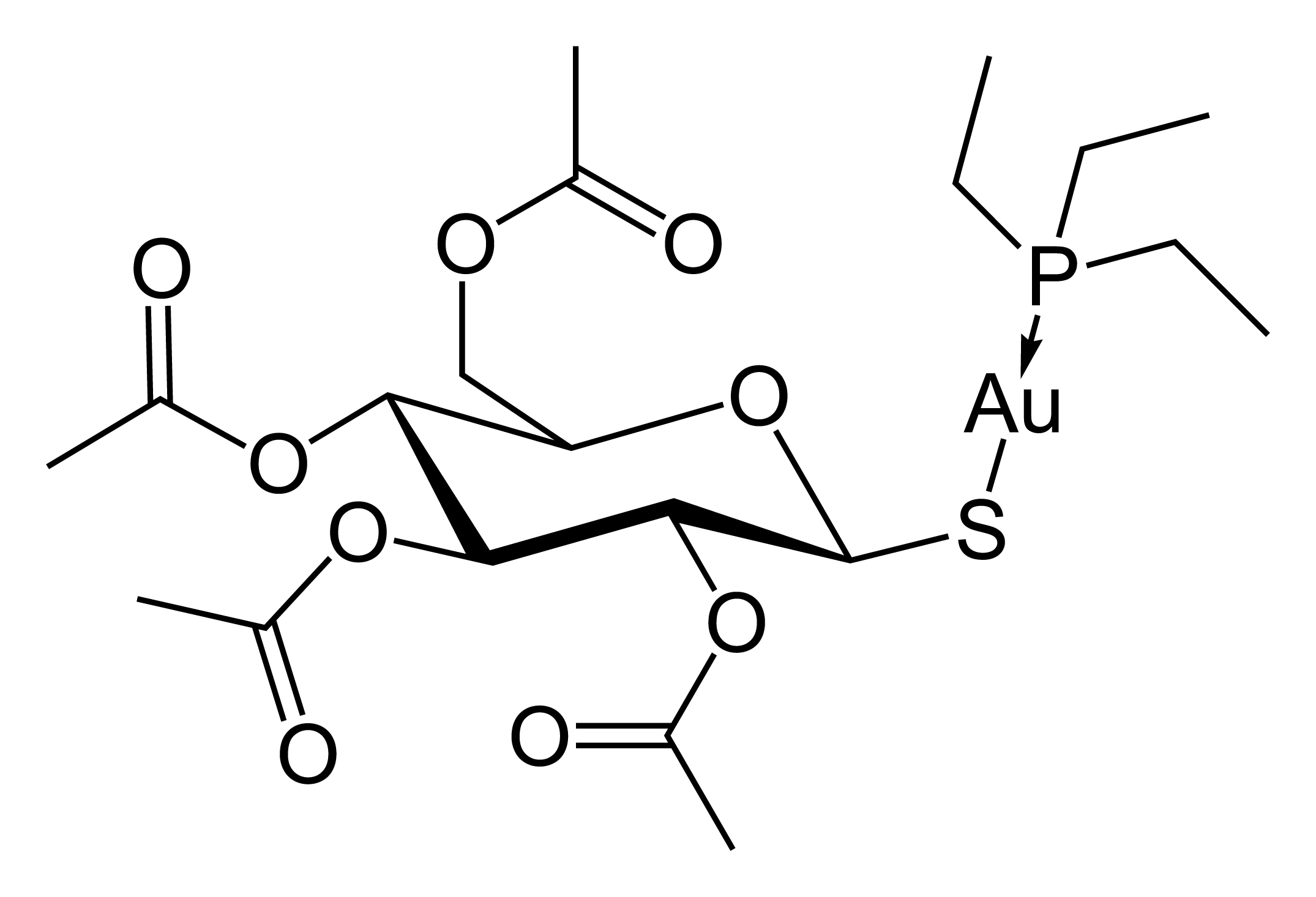
Auranofin

Gold-containing drugs are pharmaceuticals that contain the chemical element gold (Au). Sometimes these species are referred to as "gold salts" (or medicinal gold). Chrysotherapy and aurotherapy are the applications of gold compounds to medicine. Research on the medicinal effects of gold began in 1935 (primarily to reduce inflammation and to slow disease progression in patients with rheumatoid arthritis). The use of gold compounds has decreased since the 1980s because of numerous side effects and monitoring requirements, limited efficacy, and very slow onset of action. Most chemical compounds of gold, including some of the drugs discussed below, are not salts, but are examples of metal thiolate complexes.

Gold nanoparticles could have biomedical applications.

== Use in rheumatoid arthritis ==
Investigation of medical applications of gold began at the end of the 19th century, when gold cyanide demonstrated efficacy in treating Mycobacterium tuberculosis in vitro.

=== Indications ===
The use of injected gold compound is indicated for rheumatoid arthritis. Its uses have diminished with the advent of newer compounds such as methotrexate and because of numerous side effects. The efficacy of orally administered gold is more limited than injecting the gold compounds.

=== Mechanism in arthritis ===
The mechanism by which gold drugs affect arthritis is unknown.

=== Administration ===
Gold-containing drugs for rheumatoid arthritis are administered by intramuscular injection but can also be administered orally (although the efficacy is low). Regular urine tests to check for protein, indicating kidney damage, and blood tests are required.

=== Efficacy ===
A 1997 review (Suarez-Almazor ME, et al) reports that treatment with intramuscular gold (parenteral gold) reduces disease activity and joint inflammation. Gold-containing drugs taken by mouth are less effective than by injection. Three to six months are often required before gold treatment noticeably improves symptoms.

== Side effects ==
=== Chrysiasis ===
A noticeable side-effect of gold-based therapy is skin discoloration, in shades of mauve to a purplish dark grey when exposed to sunlight. Skin discoloration occurs when gold salts are taken on a regular basis over a long period of time. Excessive intake of gold salts while undergoing chrysotherapy results – through complex redox processes – in the saturation by relatively stable gold compounds of skin tissue and organs (as well as teeth and ocular tissue in extreme cases) in a condition known as chrysiasis. This condition is similar to argyria, which is caused by exposure to silver salts and colloidal silver. Chrysiasis can ultimately lead to acute kidney injury (such as tubular necrosis, nephrosis, glomerulitis), severe heart conditions, and hematologic complications (leukopenia, anemia). While some effects can be healed with moderate success, the skin discoloration is considered permanent.

=== Other side effects ===
Other side effects of gold-containing drugs include kidney damage, itching rash, and ulcerations of the mouth, tongue, and pharynx. Approximately 35% of patients discontinue the use of gold salts because of these side effects. Kidney function must be monitored continuously while taking gold compounds.

== Types ==
- Disodium aurothiomalate
- Sodium aurothiosulfate (Gold sodium thiosulfate)
- Sodium aurothiomalate (Gold sodium thiomalate) (UK)
- Auranofin (UK & US)
- Aurothioglucose (Gold thioglucose) (US)
- Aurotioprol
