= Xavier Delore =

French surgeon and obstetrician

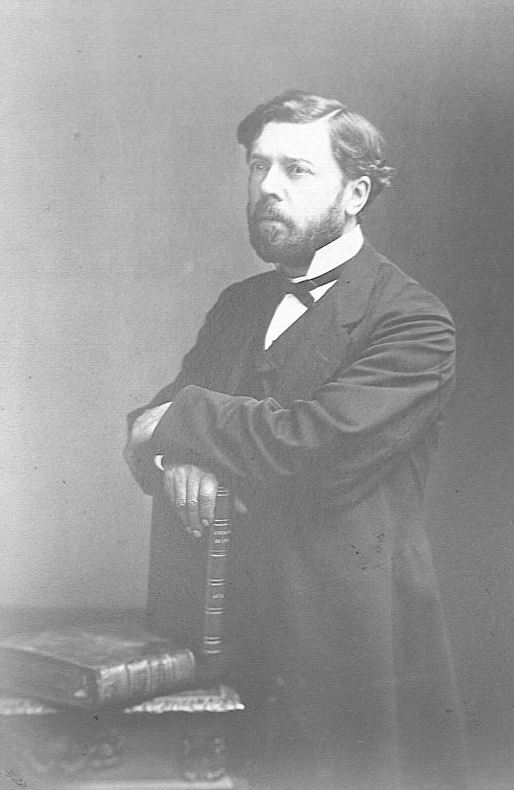
- Born: 7 August 1828
- Died: 20 February 1916 (aged 87)
- Scientific career
- Fields: General surgery, Obstetrics, Gynecology

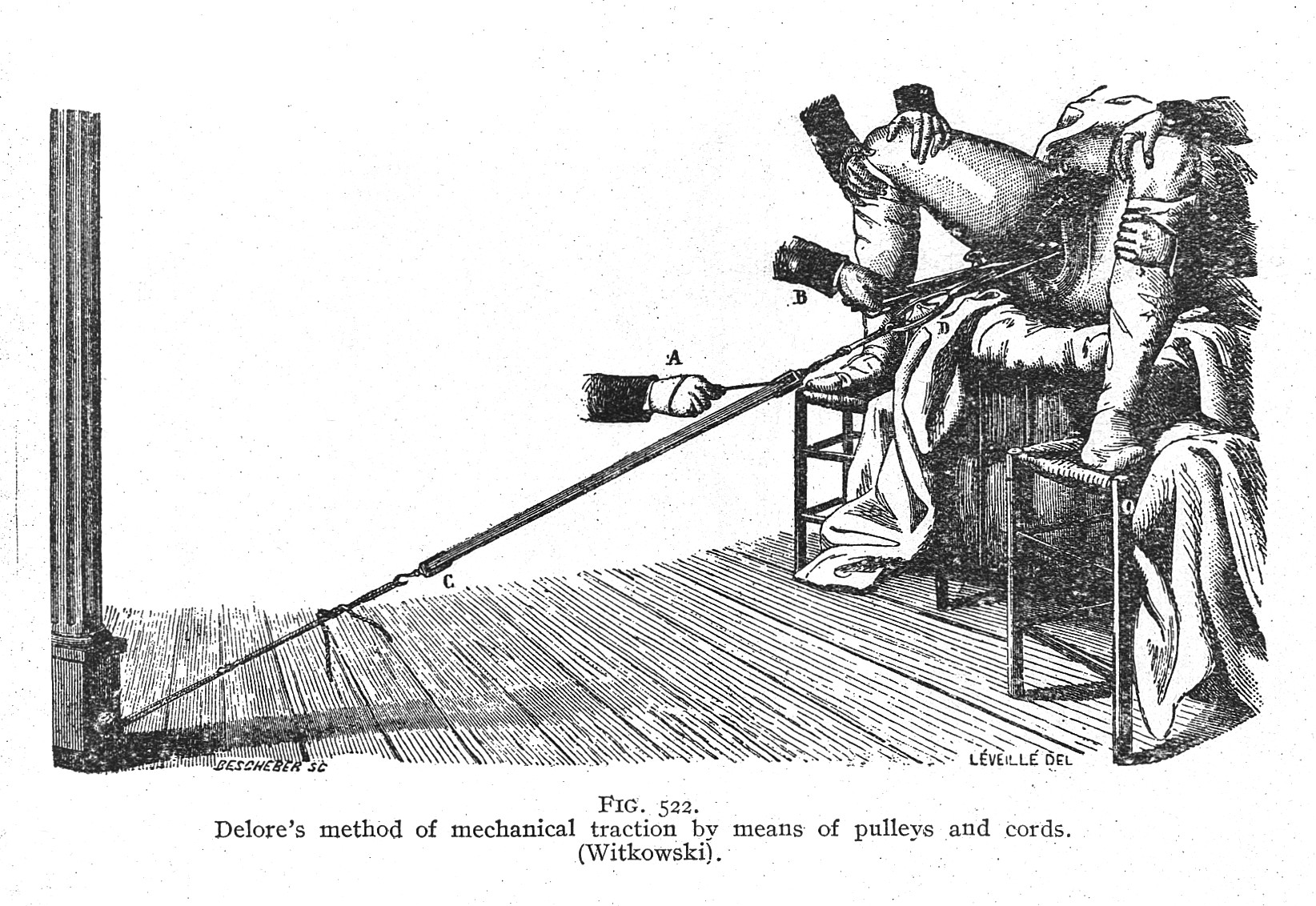
Delore's method of mechanical traction with pullies and cords during childbirth. 1929.

Xavier Delore (7 August 1828, Fleurie – 20 February 1916, Romanèche-Thorins) was a French surgeon and obstetrician.

In Lyon he served as surgeon-major at Charité Hospital (1859–1872) and associate professor of clinical obstetrics at the Faculty of Medicine and Pharmacy (1877–1886). His name is associated with "Delore's method", defined as a forcible manual procedure for treatment of genu valgum.

== Selected works ==
With surgeon Antonin Poncet, he was co-author of "Traité de la cystostomie sus-pubienne chez les prostatiques. Création d'un urèthre hypogastrique" (1899). Other works by Delore include:

- Influence de la physiologie moderne sur la médecine pratique, 1864 – Influence of modern physiology towards the practice of medicine.
- Du traitement des ankyloses; examen critique des diverses méthodes, 1864 – On treatment for ankylosis, a critique of diverse methods.
- De l'Hygiène des maternités, discours d'installation prononcé, 1866 - On maternal hygiene.
- De la ventilation des hôpitaux, 1868 - Airing hospitals.
- De la Fonction du nouvel urètre (urètre hypogastrique) chez les prostatiques anciennement cystostomisés, 1897 – Function of the hypogastric ureter, etc.
- La tuberculose génitale chez l'homme et chez la femme, 1920 – Genital tuberculosis of men and women.
