= Léon Eugène Bérard =

French surgeon and oncologist

Léon Eugène Bérard (17 February 1870, in Morez – 2 September 1956, in Lyon) was a French surgeon and oncologist. He was the younger brother of Hellenist scholar Victor Bérard (1864–1931).

== Life ==
He studied medicine in Lyon obtaining his doctorate in 1896. In 1898 he earned his agrégation in surgery, later being assigned as a surgeon to Lyon hospitals (1901). In 1914 he became a professor of clinical surgery, and from 1923 to 1940 served as director of the cancer centre in Lyon (later named the "Centre Léon-Bérard" in his honor).

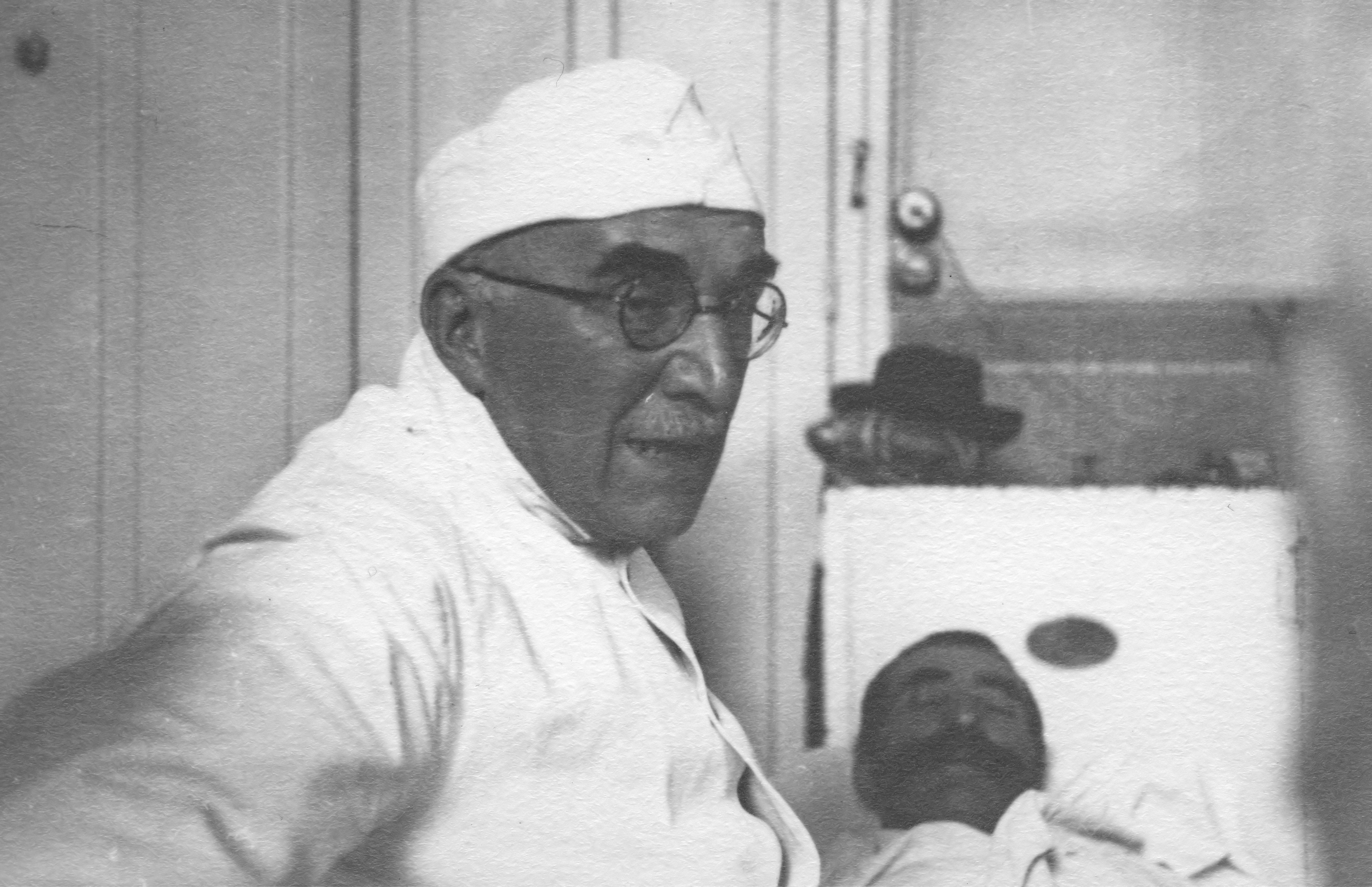
Léon Eugène Bérard (1870–1956)

Known for his pioneer work in the fight against cancer, he was among the first physicians to utilize radium as a treatment for cancer of the buccal mucosa and for cancer of the cervix.

He was a member of the Société de chirurgie de Lyon and of the Société nationale de médecine et des sciences médicales de Lyon. From 1946 to 1956 he was a corresponding member of the Académie des sciences.

== Selected works ==
- Contribution à l'anatomie et à la chirurgie du goître : parallèle entre la thyroïdectomie partielle, les énucléations et l'exothyropexie, 1896 (under the direction of Antonin Poncet) – Contribution to the anatomy and surgery of goiter: Parallel partial thyroidectomy between enucleation and exothyropexy.
- Traité clinique de l'actinomycose humaine, pseudo-actinomycose et botryomycose, 1899 (with Antonin Poncet) – Clinical treatise on human actinomycosis, pseudo-actinomycosis and botryomycosis.
- Cancer de l'oesophage, 1927 – Cancer of the esophagus.
- Affections chirurgicales du corps thyroïde, 1929 – Surgical diseases of the thyroid gland.
