= Frédéric Justin Collet =

French pathologist and otolaryngologist

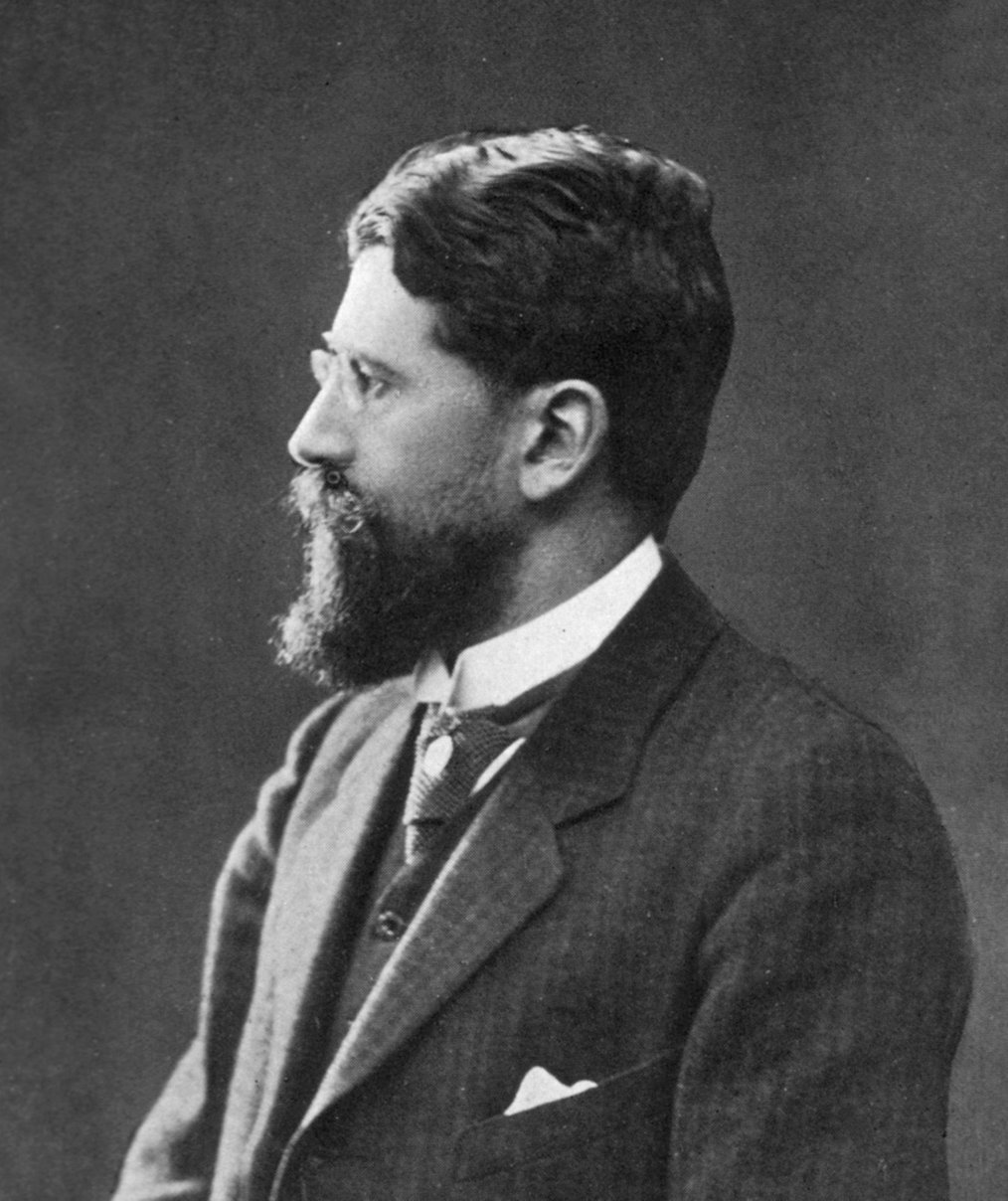
Frédéric Justin Collet

Frédéric Justin Collet (28 April 1870 – 1966) was a French pathologist and otolaryngologist.

He studied medicine in Lyon, where he had as instructors Raphaël Lépine (1851–1919), and Antonin Poncet (1849–1913). In 1894 he obtained his doctorate, and in 1901 was appointed médecin des hôpitaux. Later he became a professor of general pathology in Lyon, being appointed professor of internal pathology in 1907, and a professor of otolaryngology in 1927.

In 1910 with André Chantemesse (1851–1919) and Antonin Poncet (1849–1913), he founded the Bibliothèque de la Tuberculose, which was a collection of monographs dedicated to tuberculosis.

== Collet-Sicard syndrome ==
In 1915 he described a disorder he called "glossolaryngoscapulopharyngeal hemiplegia", which was later to be named "Collet's syndrome". This disorder is caused by a lesion of cranial nerves IX, X, XI, and XII, resulting in paralysis of the vocal cords, palate, trapezius muscle and sternocleidomastoid muscle. It also results in anaesthesia of the larynx, pharynx and soft palate. This condition is sometimes referred to as "Collet-Sicard syndrome", named in conjunction with Jean-Athanase Sicard, who provided a description of the disorder independent of Collet.

== Selected writings ==
- Atlas stéréoscopique d’anatomie du nez et du larynx (with Jean Garel), 1897.
- Les troubles auditifs dans les maladies nerveuses, 1897
- Précis de pathologie interne, 1899; 9th edition- 1926.
- L’odorat et ses troubles, 1904.
- La tuberculose du larynx et des voies respiratoires supérieures, 1913
- Précis des maladies de l’appareil respiratoire, 1914
- Oto-laryngologie avec application à la neurologie, 1928
