= Prostaglandin E =

Class of chemical compounds

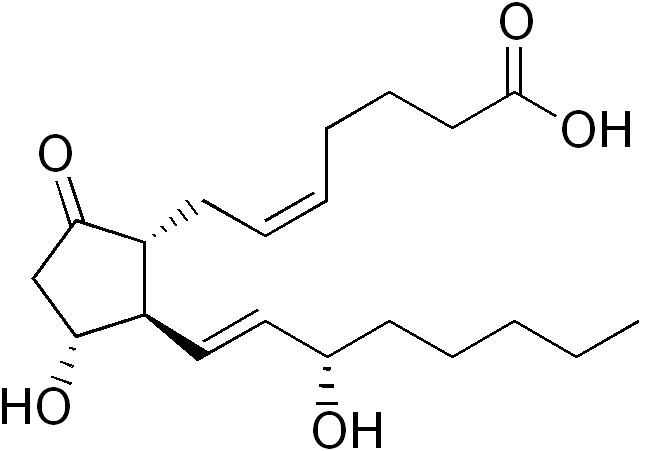
- PGE1 (alprostadil) - top PGE2 (dinoprostone) - bottom

Clinical data
- ATC code: G02AD (WHO)

Identifiers
- CAS Number: 11042-70-9
- ChemSpider: none

Prostaglandin E (PGE) is a family of naturally occurring prostaglandins involved in physiological signaling pathways, exhibiting biologically active properties for medical applications.

There are two types of prostaglandin E, which include:

- Prostaglandin E_{1} (PGE_{1}), also known as alprostadil.
- Prostaglandin E_{2} (PGE_{2}), also known as dinoprostone.

Among the two types, PGE₂ is the most extensively studied member of the prostaglandin E family. Both molecules are listed on the World Health Organization's List of Essential Medicines.

== Chemical composition ==
The structure of prostaglandin E contains a 20-carbon skeleton that includes a cyclopentane ring and two hydrocarbon side chains known as the α-chain and ω-chain. The α-chain is identified by the terminal carboxylic acid group. The classification of prostaglandin E is determined by the positioning of a ketone group at the 9th carbon position and hydroxyl at the 11th carbon position, which differs from other types of prostaglandin in the human body.

Members of the prostaglandin E family are synthesized through the oxidation of polyunsaturated fatty acid substrates by cyclooxygenase (COX) enzymes. PGE_{1} and PGE_{2} differ in their lipid precursors. PGE_{1} is derived from dihomo-r-linolenic acid, while PGE_{2} is derived from arachidonic acid (AA). The cyclooxygenase pathway produces the intermediate prostaglandin H_{2} (PGH_{2}), which can be differentiated into other prostaglandin molecules by target enzymes. PGH_{2} can be converted into PGE_{2} by specific PGE synthases, such as microsomal prostaglandin E₂ synthase-1 (mPGES-1). The pathway for PGE_{1} remains unclear.

== Receptor binding and affinity ==
Members of prostaglandin E generally exhibit biological activity through binding of the E prostanoid (EP) receptor family. There are four different receptors, including subtypes EP1, EP2, EP3, and EP4, all of which are G protein-coupled receptors (GPCRs). Although PGE_{2} is the primary ligand, PGE_{1} can bind and activate these receptors with lower affinity. Interactions with other prostaglandin receptor types (e.g., IP, FP receptors) can be observed due to structural similarity with other prostaglandin molecules, but with low affinity and therefore has limited physiological relevance.

== Medical significance ==
The prostaglandin E family, notably PGE_{2}, play a central role in inflammation and regulating physiological effects such as pain, thermoregulation of the human brain, vascular permeability, and immune signaling. PGE_{1} has been seen to contribute to mechanical allodynia and vasodilation. Excessive or prolonged PGE production is involved in the development of chronic inflammatory diseases, making the PGE biosynthetic pathway an important target for therapeutic intervention. Common forms of treatment include the use of nonsteroidal anti-inflammatory drugs (NSAIDs), which act by inhibiting cyclooxygenase (COX) enzymes upstream in the pathway, suppressing the formation of prostaglandin E. Although effective, this inhibition is non-selective, which effectively reduces production of other prostaglandin molecules involved in physiological homeostasis. The use of NSAIDs, especially with long-term use, prompt adverse side effects as a result of general COX suppression, including increased cardiovascular risk and renal dysfunction.
