= Aurotioprol =

Chemical compound

Clinical data
- AHFS/Drugs.com: International Drug Names
- Routes of administration: Intramuscular injection
- ATC code: M01CB05 (WHO)

Identifiers
- IUPAC name: Sodium aurothiopropanolsulfonate
- CAS Number: 27279-43-2
- PubChem CID: 44144564
- ChemSpider: 8628381
- UNII: G7097J63E9
- CompTox Dashboard (EPA): DTXSID60912312
- ECHA InfoCard: 100.043.971

Chemical and physical data
- Formula: C_{3}H_{6}AuNaO_{4}S_{2}
- Molar mass: 390.15 g·mol^{−1}
- 3D model (JSmol): Interactive image
- SMILES: C(C(CS(=O)(=O)[O-])O)[S-].[Na+].[Au+]
- InChI: InChI=1S/C3H8O4S2.Au.Na/c4-3(1-8)2-9(5,6)7;;/h3-4,8H,1-2H2,(H,5,6,7);;/q;2*+1/p-2; Key:KBWWFTIQBJUOQR-UHFFFAOYSA-L

Aurotioprol is a gold salt used as an antirheumatic agent.
