= PTGES3 =

Protein-coding gene in the species Homo sapiens

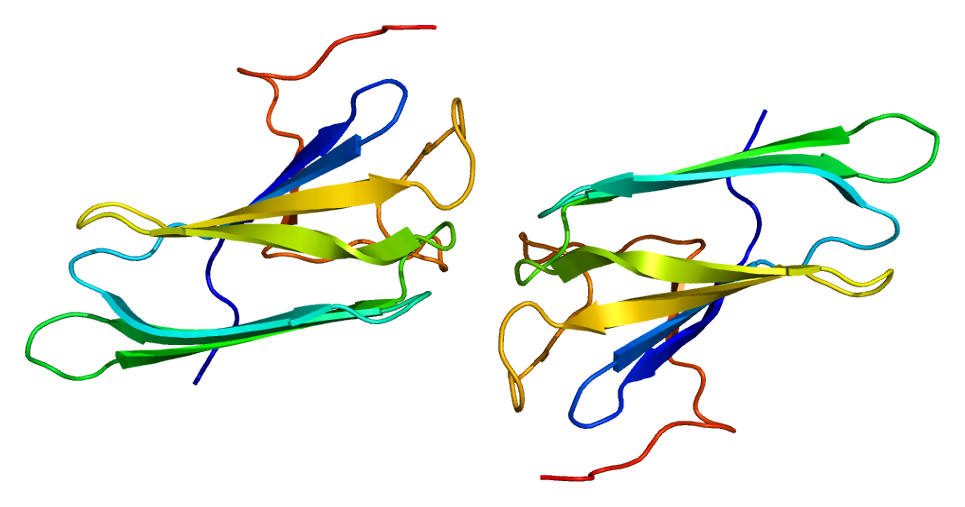
Available structures
PDB	Ortholog search: PDBe RCSB
PDB	List of PDB id codes 1EJF

Identifiers
- Aliases: PTGES3, P23, TEBP, cPGES, prostaglandin E synthase 3
- External IDs: OMIM: 607061; MGI: 1929282; HomoloGene: 128197; GeneCards: PTGES3; OMA:PTGES3 - orthologs

Gene location (Human)
Chr.	Chromosome 12 (human)
Band	12q13.3|12	Start	56,663,341 bp
Band	12q13.3|12	End	56,688,408 bp

Gene location (Mouse)
Chr.	Chromosome 10 (mouse)
Band	10|10 D3	Start	127,894,823 bp
Band	10|10 D3	End	127,913,141 bp
RNA expression pattern
Bgee	Human / Mouse (ortholog); Top expressed in: secondary oocyte; bronchial epithelial cell; gonad; mucosa of sigmoid colon; caput epididymis; ventricular zone; embryo; ganglionic eminence; corpus epididymis; trabecular bone / Top expressed in: abdominal wall; medullary collecting duct; renal corpuscle; Gonadal ridge; endocardial cushion; cumulus cell; primitive streak; vas deferens; migratory enteric neural crest cell; epiblast; More reference expression data
BioGPS	n/a
Gene ontology
Molecular function	unfolded protein binding; telomerase activity; isomerase activity; protein binding; prostaglandin-E synthase activity; Hsp90 protein binding; DNA polymerase binding; chaperone binding
Cellular component	nucleoplasm; telomere; telomerase holoenzyme complex; extracellular exosome; nucleus; cytoplasm; cytosol; protein-containing complex; chaperone complex
Biological process	prostaglandin metabolic process; lipid metabolism; cyclooxygenase pathway; fatty acid metabolic process; fatty acid biosynthetic process; regulation of cellular response to heat; prostaglandin biosynthetic process; telomere maintenance; signal transduction; xenobiotic metabolic process; telomere maintenance via telomerase; positive regulation of phosphorylation; positive regulation of telomerase activity; telomerase holoenzyme complex assembly; protein stabilization; chaperone-mediated protein complex assembly; protein folding; chaperone cofactor-dependent protein refolding
Sources:Amigo / QuickGO
Orthologs
Species	Human	Mouse
Entrez	10728	56351
Ensembl	ENSG00000110958	ENSMUSG00000071072
UniProt	Q15185	Q9R0Q7
RefSeq (mRNA)	NM_001282601; NM_001282602; NM_001282603; NM_001282604; NM_001282605 NM_006601	NM_019766
RefSeq (protein)	NP_001269530; NP_001269531; NP_001269532; NP_001269533; NP_001269534 NP_006592	NP_062740
Location (UCSC)	Chr 12: 56.66 – 56.69 Mb	Chr 10: 127.89 – 127.91 Mb
PubMed search
- Wikidata
View/Edit Human	View/Edit Mouse

Prostaglandin E synthase 3 (cytosolic) is a Prostaglandin E synthase enzyme that in humans is encoded by the PTGES3 gene.

The protein encoded by this gene is also known as p23 which functions as a chaperone which is required for proper functioning of the glucocorticoid and other steroid receptors.
