= Victor Bérard =

French diplomat and politician (1864-1931)

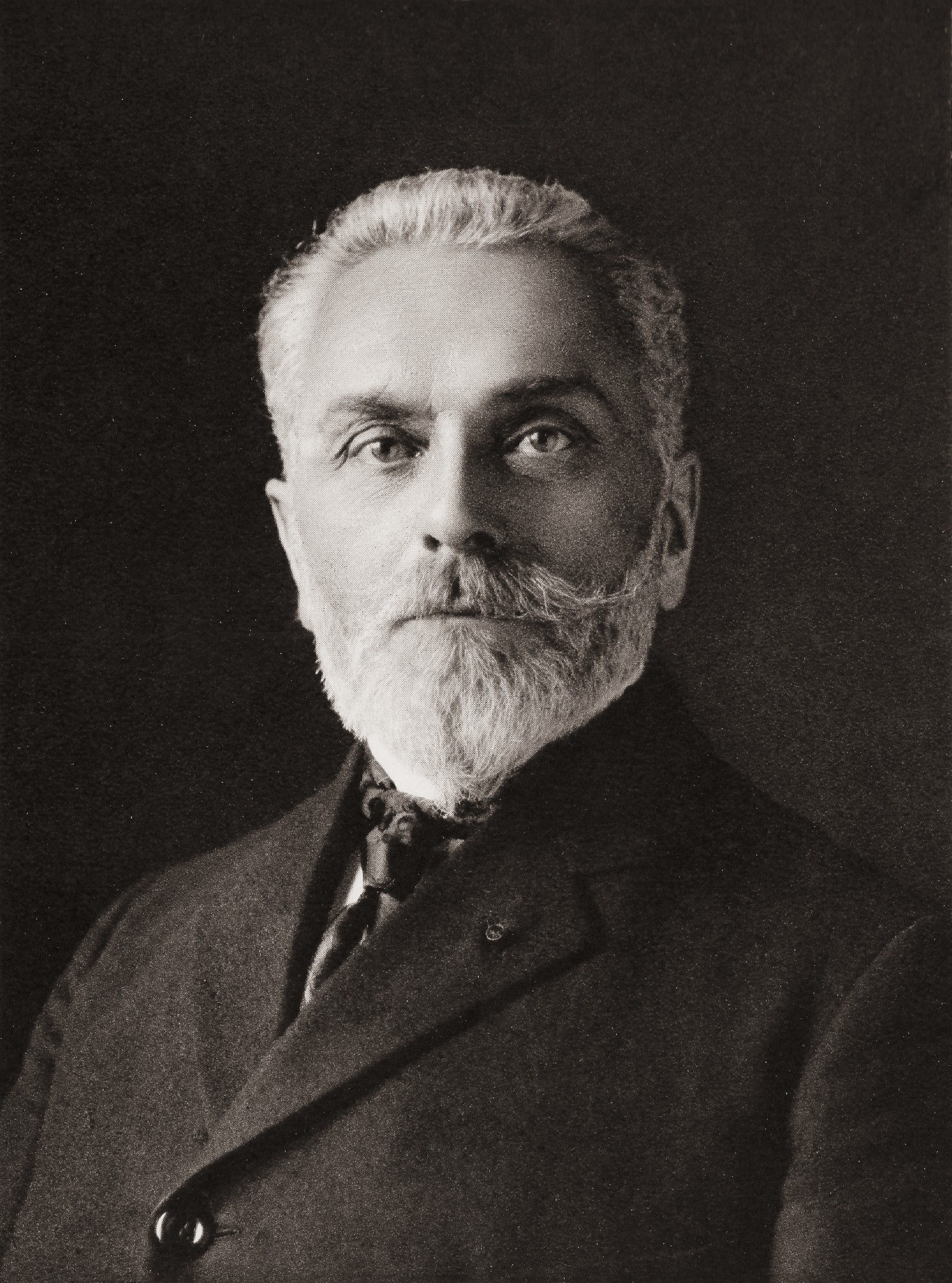
- Photographed in 1920

Member of the French Senate for Jura
- In office January 11, 1920 – November 13, 1931

Personal details
- Born: August 10, 1864 Morez, Jura, French Empire
- Died: November 13, 1931 (aged 67) Paris, French Republic
- Relations: Léon Eugène Bérard (brother)
- Education: École normale supérieure (1887)
- Occupation: Politician, diplomat

Victor Bérard (French: [beʁaʁ]; Morez, 10 August 1864 – Paris, 13 November 1931) was a French diplomat and politician.

Today, he is still renowned for his works about Hellenistic studies and geography of the Odyssey. Bérard's "L'Angleterre et l'impérialisme" was translated into English and published in 1906 as "British imperialism and commercial supremacy" (Longmans, Green, London, New York).

A former student at the École normale supérieure (Paris), Victor Bérard conducted archeological work as a member of the French School at Athens (1887 to 1890). This would lead him to perform frequent travels across the Ottoman Empire, on which occasions he was distressed by the misery of the Armenians and the Old Christians. His PhD thesis is devoted to the ancient cults in Arcadia and their genesis. Throughout the 1890s, he was a chronicler for Revue de Paris, reporting mostly about the political events in Greece and the Ottoman Empire.

== Bibliography ==
- L'Angleterre et l'Impérialisme, Armand Colin, Paris, 1900
- Les Phéniciens et l'Odyssée (1902–1903, re-ed. 1927), Armand Colin, Paris, 1902–1903 (and 1927)
- Les navigations d'Ulysse, Armand Colin, Paris, 1927–1929 (and 1971)
- La Résurrection d'Homère, Bernard Grasset, Paris, 1930
