= Disease-modifying antirheumatic drug =

Category of drugs

Methotrexate

Hydroxychloroquine

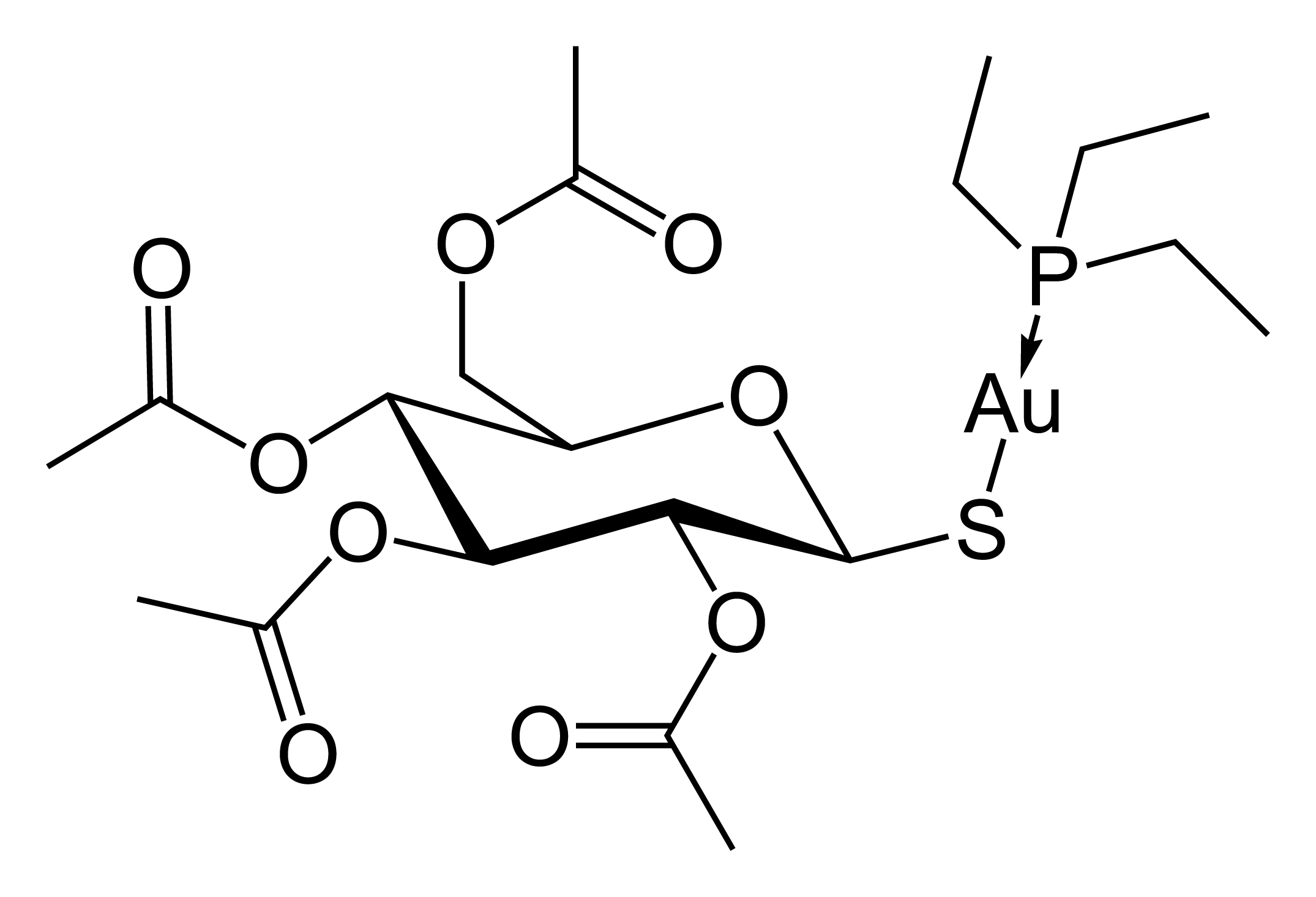
Auranofin, a gold salt

Disease-modifying antirheumatic drugs (DMARDs) comprise a category of otherwise unrelated disease-modifying drugs defined by their use in rheumatoid arthritis to slow down disease progression. The term is often used in contrast to nonsteroidal anti-inflammatory drugs (which refers to agents that treat the inflammation, but not the underlying cause) and steroids (which blunt the immune response but are insufficient to slow down the progression of the disease).

The term "antirheumatic" can be used in similar contexts, but without making a claim about an effect on the disease course. Other terms that have historically been used to refer to the same group of drugs are "remission-inducing drugs" (RIDs) and "slow-acting antirheumatic drugs" (SAARDs).

== Terminology ==
Although the use of the term DMARDs was first propagated in rheumatoid arthritis (hence their name), the term has come to pertain to many other diseases, such as Crohn's disease, lupus erythematosus, Sjögren's disease, immune thrombocytopenic purpura, myasthenia gravis, sarcoidosis, and various others.

The term was originally introduced to indicate a drug that reduces evidence of processes thought to underlie the disease, such as a raised erythrocyte sedimentation rate, reduced haemoglobin level, raised rheumatoid factor level, and more recently, a raised C-reactive protein level. More recently, the term has been used to indicate a drug that reduces the rate of damage to bone and cartilage. DMARDs can be further subdivided into traditional small molecular mass drugs synthesised chemically and newer "biological" agents produced through genetic engineering.

Some DMARDs (e.g. the purine synthesis inhibitors) are mild chemotherapeutics, but use a side effect of chemotherapy—immunosuppression—as their main therapeutical benefit.

== Subdivision ==
DMARDs have been classified as:

- synthetic (sDMARD)
  - conventional synthetic and targeted synthetic DMARDs (csDMARDs and tsDMARDs, respectively)
    - csDMARDs are the traditional drugs (such as methotrexate, sulfasalazine, leflunomide, hydroxychloroquine, gold salts)
    - tsDMARDs are drugs that were developed to target a particular molecular structure
- biological (bDMARD) can be further separated into original and biosimilar DMARDs (boDMARDs and bsDMARDs)
  - bsDMARDs are those that have the same primary, secondary, and tertiary structure as an original (boDMARD) and possess similar efficacy and safety as the original protein

== Members ==
Drug	Mechanism	Type
abatacept	T-cell costimulatory signal inhibitor	bDMARD
adalimumab	TNF inhibitor	bDMARD
anakinra	IL-1 receptor antagonist	bDMARD
apremilast	phosphodiesterase 4 (PDE4) inhibitor	tsDMARD
azathioprine	Purine synthesis inhibitor	unknown
baricitinib	JAK1 and JAK2 inhibitor	tsDMARD
certolizumab pegol	TNF inhibitor	bDMARD
chloroquine (anti-malarial)	Suppression of IL-1, induce apoptosis of inflammatory cells and decrease chemotaxis	unknown
ciclosporin (Cyclosporin A)	calcineurin inhibitor	unknown
D-penicillamine (seldom used today)	Reducing numbers of T-lymphocytes etc.	unknown
etanercept	decoy TNF receptor	bDMARD
filgotinib	Janus kinase (JAK) inhibitor	tsDMARD
golimumab	TNF inhibitor	bDMARD
gold salts (sodium aurothiomalate, auranofin) (seldom used today)	unknown	csDMARD
hydroxychloroquine (anti-malarial)	TNF-alpha, induce apoptosis of inflammatory cells and decrease chemotaxis	csDMARD
infliximab	TNF inhibitor	bDMARD
leflunomide	Pyrimidine synthesis inhibitor	csDMARD
methotrexate (MTX)	Purine metabolism inhibitor	csDMARD
minocycline	5-LO inhibitor	unknown
rituximab	chimeric monoclonal antibody against CD20 on B-cell surface	bDMARD
sarilumab	IL-6 receptor antagonist	bDMARD
secukinumab	IL-17 inhibitor	bDMARD
sulfasalazine (SSZ)	Suppression of IL-1 & TNF-alpha, induce apoptosis of inflammatory cells and increase chemotactic factors	csDMARD
tocilizumab	IL-6 receptor antagonist	bDMARD
tofacitinib	Janus kinase (JAK) inhibitor	tsDMARD
upadacitinib	Janus kinase (JAK) inhibitor	tsDMARD
ustekinumab	IL-12 and IL-23 inhibitor	bDMARD

Although these agents operate by different mechanisms, many of them can have similar impacts upon the course of a condition. Some of the drugs can be used in combination. A common triple therapy for rheumatoid arthritis is methotrexate, sulfasalazine, and hydroxychloroquine.

== Alternatives ==
When treatment with DMARDs fails, cyclophosphamide or steroid pulse therapy is often used to stabilise uncontrolled autoimmune disease. Some severe autoimmune diseases are being treated with bone marrow transplants in clinical trials, usually after cyclophosphamide therapy has failed. Furthermore, should DMARDs fail, tocilizumab can be used for tumor necrosis factor (TNF) inhibitor treatments in NICE guidance.

Combinations of DMARDs are often used, because each drug in the combination can be used in a smaller dose than if it were given alone, thus reducing the risk of side effects.

Many patients receive an NSAID and at least one DMARD, sometimes with low-dose oral glucocorticoids. If disease remission is observed, regular NSAIDs or glucocorticoid treatment may no longer be needed. DMARDs help control arthritis, but do not cure the disease. For that reason, if remission or optimal control is achieved with a DMARD, it is often continued as a maintenance dosage. Discontinuing a DMARD may reactivate disease or cause a "rebound flare", with no assurance that disease control will be re-established upon resumption of the medication.
