= Antonin Poncet =

French surgeon

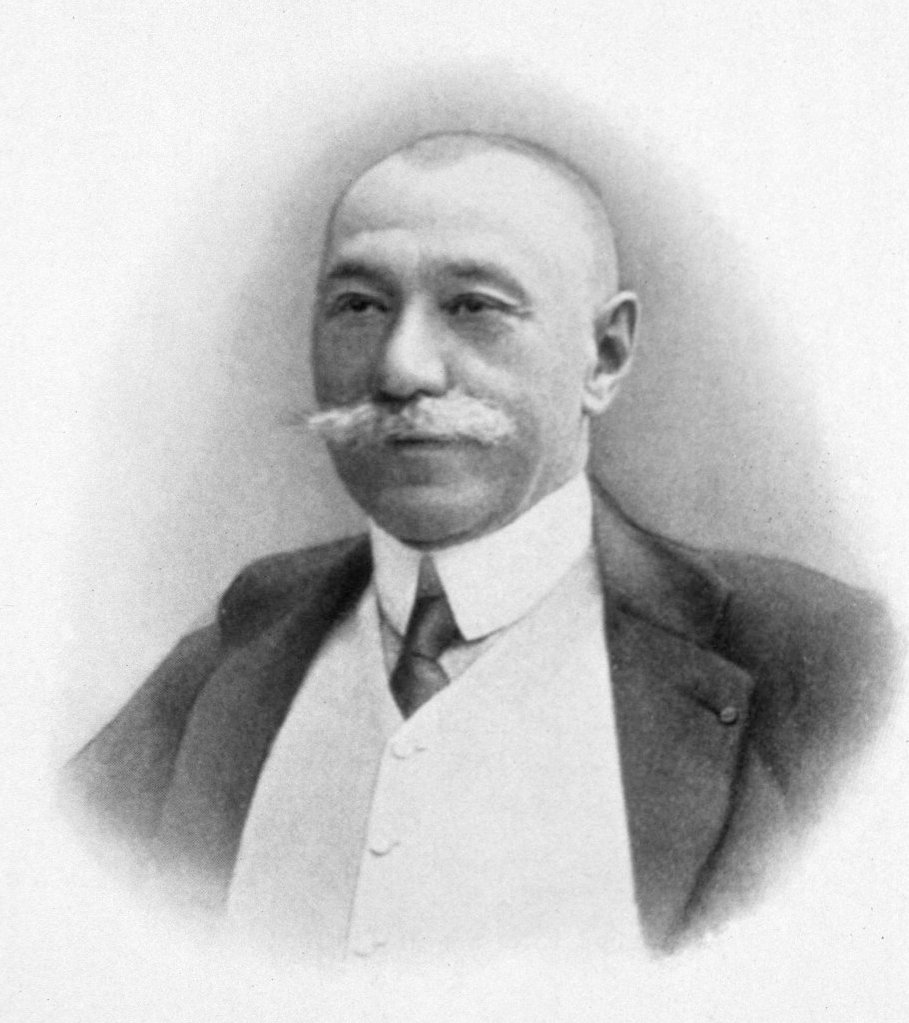
Antonin Poncet

Antonin Poncet (French pronunciation: [ɑ̃tɔnɛ̃ pɔ̃sɛ]; 28 March 1849, Saint-Trivier-sur-Moignans, Ain – 16 September 1913) was a French surgeon.

Son of Jean Joseph Poncet and Catherine Jeanne Chabalier, he was inspired by his grandfather Jean-Pierre Antoine Chabalier, surgeon in the Imperial Army.

He studied medicine in Lyon, where he served as interne des hôpitaux. He was a member of the Lyon ambulance corps during the Franco-Prussian War, and in 1878 became a member of the surgical section of the Lyon faculty of medicine. In 1883 he attained the chair of operative medicine in Lyon.

With Louis Léopold Ollier, Poncet is credited for introducing aseptic practices to Hôtel-Dieu. A rare form of polyarthritis that occurs in patients with tuberculous infection is named after him, and is called "Poncet's disease".

Following the assassination of Marie François Sadi Carnot in Lyon on 24 June 1894, Drs. Poncet and Ollier attended to the wounded French president. Today, the Prix Antonin Poncet is a monetary award issued by the Université Claude Bernard for surgical research.

== Written works ==
- De l’hématocèle périutérine. Paris, 1878.
- Traité clinique de l’actinomycose humaine. with Léon Eugène Bérard (1870–1956). Paris, 1898.
- Traité de la cystostomie sus-pubienne chez les prostatiques. Création d'un urèthre hypogastrique. with Xavier Delore (1828–1916). Paris, Masson et cie éditeurs, 1899. 444 pages.
- Traité de l’uréthrostomie. with Xavier Delore. Paris, 1900.
- Rhumatisme tuberculeux. with M. Mailland. Paris, 1909.
- Bibliothèque de la Tuberculose. a collection of monographs devoted to tuberculosis, with André Chantemesse & Frédéric Justin Collet. 1910
