= Jean-Athanase Sicard =

French neuroscientist and radiologist (1872–1929)

Jean-Athanase Sicard (23 June 1872 – 28 January 1929) was a French neurologist and radiologist born in Marseille.

He studied medicine in Marseille and Paris, where he studied with Charles Emile Troisier (1844-1919), Édouard Brissaud (1852-1909), Henri-Alexandre Danlos (1844-1912), Fulgence Raymond (1844-1910) and Georges-Fernand-Isidore Widal (1862-1929). With Widal he performed serodiagnostic studies in immunology. In 1899 he obtained his medical doctorate, and in 1910 was appointed chef de service at the Hôpital Necker. In 1923 he became a professor of internal pathology.

With Jacques Forestier (1890-1978), he introduced lipiodol (radio-opaque iodized poppyseed oil) for use in radiological investigations. Lipiodol was injected into a patients' cerebrospinal fluid for myelographic diagnosis and localization of intraspinal cysts and tumors. Sicard is also credited for introducing injections of sodium salicylate for treatment of varicose veins, as well as alcohol injections for relief of trigeminal neuralgia. In addition, he was one of the first physicians to become interested in the possibilities of a procedure known as pneumoencephalography.

Along with Frédéric Justin Collet (1870-1966), Sicard is credited with identifying Collet-Sicard syndrome, a disorder in which neck trauma such as a Jefferson fracture causes damage to the cranial nerves.

== Written works ==
- Le liquide céphalo-rachidien. Paris, 1902.
- La névralgie faciale essentielle et son traitement par les injections locales neurologiques. Paris, 1911.
- Méthode radiographique d’exploration de la cavité épidurale par la lipiodol; Written with Jacques Forestier (1890-1978). Revue neurologique, Paris, 1921, 28: 1264-1266. Lipide (iodised oil) first used in radiology. Positive contrast myelography with iodised oil (lipiodol).
- Traitement des varices par les injections phlébo-sclérosantes du salicylate de soude. Written with J. Paraf and J. Lermoyez. Gazette des hôpitaux, Paris, 1922, 95: 1573-1575.
- L’exploration radiologique des cavités broncho-pulmonaires par les injections intra-trachéales d’huile iodée. With Jacques Forestier. J méd Franç, 1924, 13: 3-9.
- Le traitement des varices par la méthode sclérosante. With L. Gaugier. Paris, 1927; 3rd edition, 1931.
