= Auranofin =

Chemical compound

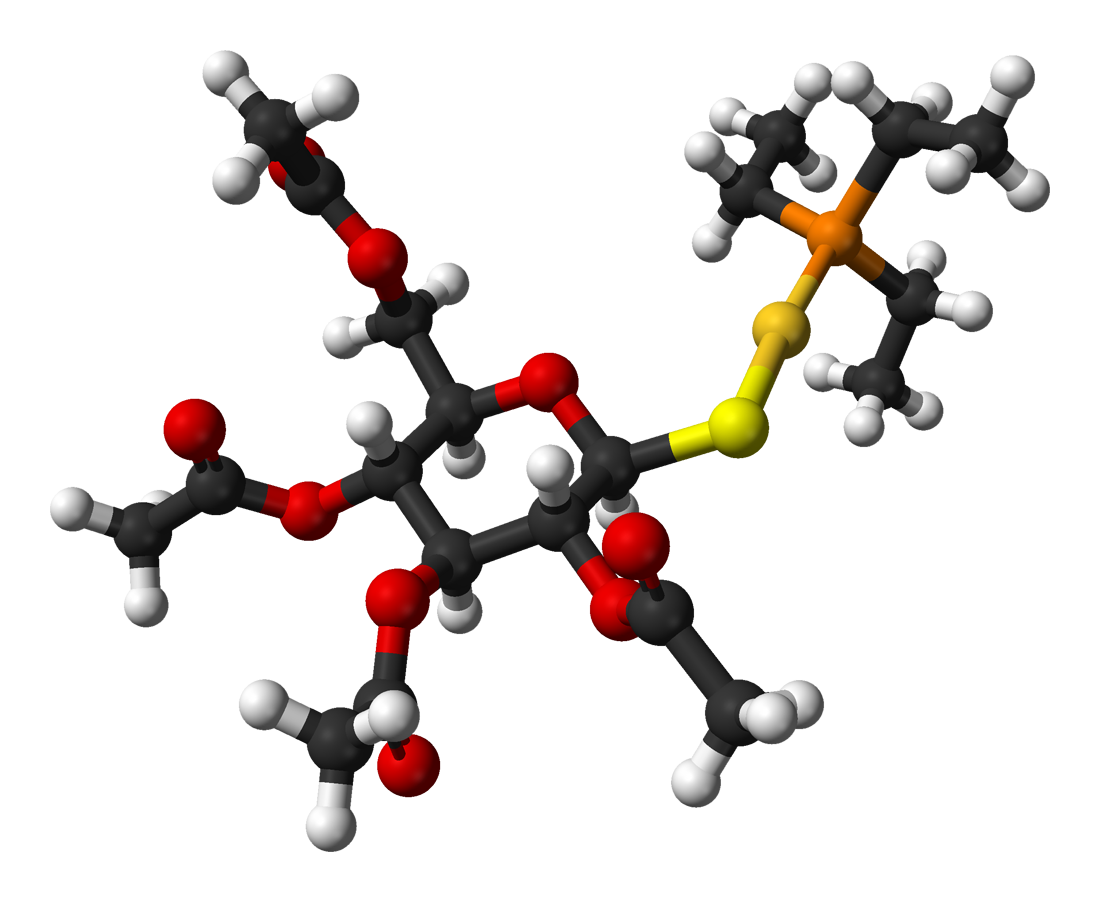

Clinical data
- Trade names: Ridaura
- AHFS/Drugs.com: Consumer Drug Information
- MedlinePlus: a685038
- Pregnancy category: AU: B3
- Routes of administration: Oral
- ATC code: M01CB03 (WHO)

Legal status
- Legal status: AU: S4 (Prescription only); UK: POM (Prescription only); US: ℞-only

Pharmacokinetic data
- Bioavailability: 40%
- Protein binding: 60%
- Metabolism: Plasma membrane of the cell removes the acetyl groups of the glucose moiety.
- Elimination half-life: 21-31 days
- Excretion: Urine (60%), faeces

Identifiers
- IUPAC name: (2,3,4,6-tetra-O-acetyl-1-thio-β-D-glucopyranosato-κS^{1})(triethylphosphine)gold
- CAS Number: 34031-32-8
- PubChem CID: 6333901
- DrugBank: DB00995
- ChemSpider: 21242895
- UNII: 3H04W2810V
- KEGG: D00237
- ChEBI: CHEBI:2922
- ChEMBL: ChEMBL1366
- CompTox Dashboard (EPA): DTXSID4020115
- ECHA InfoCard: 100.047.077

Chemical and physical data
- Formula: C_{20}H_{34}AuO_{9}PS^{0}
- Molar mass: 678.48 g·mol^{−1}
- 3D model (JSmol): Interactive image
- SMILES: CCP(=[Au]S[C@H]1[C@@H]([C@H]([C@@H]([C@H](O1)COC(=O)C)OC(=O)C)OC(=O)C)OC(=O)C)(CC)CC
- InChI: InChI=1S/C14H20O9S.C6H15P.Au/c1-6(15)19-5-10-11(20-7(2)16)12(21-8(3)17)13(14(24)23-10)22-9(4)18;1-4-7(5-2)6-3;/h10-14,24H,5H2,1-4H3;4-6H2,1-3H3;/q;;+1/p-1/t10-,11-,12+,13-,14+;;/m1../s1; Key:AUJRCFUBUPVWSZ-XTZHGVARSA-M

Auranofin is an orally administered gold salt classified by the World Health Organization as an antirheumatic agent. It has the brand name Ridaura. Along with sodium aurothiomalate, it is one of only two gold compounds currently employed in modern medicine.

== Use ==
Auranofin is used to treat rheumatoid arthritis. It improves arthritis symptoms including painful or tender and swollen joints and morning stiffness. Auranofin is a safer treatment compared to the more common injectable gold thiolates (gold sodium thiomalate and gold thioglucose), but meta-analysis of 66 clinical trials concluded that it is somewhat less effective.

The drug was approved for the treatment of rheumatoid arthritis in 1985. It is no longer a first-line treatment for rheumatoid arthritis, due to its adverse effects, most of which are associated with long-term use for chronic disease. The most common adverse effects are gastrointestinal complaints such as loose stools, abdominal cramping and watery diarrhea, which can develop in the early months of treatment. The development of loose stools occurs in 40% of patients, while watery diarrhea is reported in just 2–5% of patients, and in most cases these symptoms can be alleviated by reducing or splitting the dose.

== Research ==
=== HIV infection ===
Auranofin is under investigation as a means of reducing the viral reservoir of HIV that lies latent in the body's T-cells despite treatment with antiretroviral therapy. The drug was shown to reduce the amount of latent virus in monkey trials. A human study testing auranofin and other investigational treatments is ongoing in Brazil. Preliminary results show that auranofin contributed to a decrease in the viral reservoir.

=== Amebiasis ===
Auranofin has been identified in a high-throughput drug screen as 10 times more potent than metronidazole against Entamoeba histolytica, the protozoan agent of human amebiasis. Assays of thioredoxin reductase and transcriptional profiling suggest that the effect of auranofin on the enzyme enhances the sensitivity of the trophozoites to reactive oxygen-mediated killing in mouse and hamster models; the results are marked reductions of the number of parasites, the inflammatory reaction to the infestation, and the damage to the liver.

=== Acanthamoeba keratitis and primary amoebic meningoencephalitis ===
Auranofin may be useful in the prevention and control of Acanthamoeba infections, and in the treatment of primary amoebic meningoencephalitis, caused by pathogenic free-living amoebae Acanthamoeba spp. and Naegleria fowleri, respectively.

=== Tuberculosis ===
In a cell-based screen, auranofin showed potent activity against replicating and non-replicating M. tuberculosis as well as other gram-positive bacteria. Auranofin protected mice from an otherwise lethal infection with methicillin-resistant S. aureus (MRSA). The drug acts in a similar manner in bacteria as in parasites by inhibiting thioredoxin reductase (TrxR). Studies in humans are needed to evaluate the potential of this drug to treat Gram-positive bacterial infections in humans.

=== Ovarian cancer ===
Drug-screening reveals auranofin induces apoptosis in ovarian cancer cells in vitro.

=== Lung cancers including adenocarcinoma ===
When mice with Protein kinase Cι (PKCι)–dependent KP adenocarcinoma tumors that exhibited resistance to anti–PD-1 antibody therapy (α-PD-1) were treated with auranofin, the PKCι inhibitor auranofin inhibited KP tumor growth and sensitized these tumors to α-PD-1. The Mayo clinic is running a clinical trial to research the effects of auranofin and sirolimus on squamous, ras mutated lung adenocarcinoma, and small cell lung cancer. Its anticancer mechanism may be related to its ability to inhibit tubulin polymerization, thereby classifying it as a microtubule-targeting agent (MTA) widely used in cancer therapy.

=== COVID-19 ===
Auranofin may inhibit replication of SARS-CoV-2, the virus responsible for causing COVID-19 in cell culture. Inflammation may also be reduced.

== Etymology ==
The brand name Ridaura was coined from the phrase Remission-Inducing Drug + Auranofin.
