= Canine cognitive dysfunction =

Disease affecting dogs

Canine cognitive dysfunction (CCD) is a disease prevalent in dogs that exhibit symptoms of dementia or Alzheimer's disease shown in humans. CCD creates pathological changes in the brain that slow the mental functioning of dogs resulting in loss of memory, motor function, and learned behaviors from training early in life. In the dog's brain, the protein beta-amyloid accumulates, creating protein deposits called plaques. As the dog ages, nerve cells die, and cerebrospinal fluid fills the empty space left by the dead nerve cells. Canine cognitive dysfunction takes effect in older dogs, mostly after 10 years of age. Although there is no known cause of CCD, genetic factors have been shown to contribute to the occurrence of this disease.

== Clinical signs ==
Dogs with canine cognitive dysfunction may exhibit many symptoms associated with senile behavior and dementia. Dogs will often find themselves confused in familiar places of the home, spending long periods of time in one area of the home, not responding to calls or commands, and experiencing abnormal sleeping patterns. Although some of these symptoms may be attributed to old age itself, when they are exhibited together, there is a higher likelihood of CCD.

== Diagnosis ==
In order to properly diagnose CCD in dogs, there is a list of symptoms that when observed together, show signs of the disease.

- Disorientation – loss of ability to navigate the house or remember where specific places are (i.e. furniture, corners of rooms)
- Interaction changes – decreased interest in social interaction (i.e. petting, grooming, playing)
- Sleep/wake cycle Changes – restlessness throughout the night, sleeping during the day
- Housebreaking issues – defecating or eliminating indoors, not signaling to go outside
- Physical activity level – decreased interest in being outside, decreased responses to stimuli (e.g. sounds around home, people)

Any medical causes for these symptoms must be ruled out. Medical diagnoses that may contribute to these symptoms include thyroid disorders, Cushing's disease, diabetes, kidney disease, musculoskeletal disease, cancer, liver problems, and sensory loss. Also, behavioral problems in dogs may be factors that influence these symptoms (i.e. lack of housetraining, lack of social interaction, separation anxiety, phobias, aggression and compulsive disorders).

== Treatment ==
There is no cure for canine cognitive dysfunction, but there are medical aids to help mask the symptoms attributed to the disease as it progresses. Therapies are a major form of symptom masking, such as exercise increase, new toys, and learning new commands have shown increases in memory. Changing the dog's diet is also a helpful tool in improving memory and cell membrane health. The combination of improved brain fuel sources (like MCTs and omega-3s) and antioxidant-enriched or specialized diets strengthens both cellular and cognitive health as dogs age.

Medication is also one of the most effective ways to mask the symptoms of CCD. Anipryl (selegiline) is the only drug that has been approved for use on dogs with canine cognitive dysfunction. Anipryl is a drug that is used to treat humans with Parkinson's disease, and has shown drastic improvement in the quality of life in dogs living with CCD. In Korea a drug containing the active substance Crisdesalazine was approved for treatment of CCD. It is proposed to act as an inhibitor of the enzyme MPGES-1.

== Precautions ==
In order for dogs to cope with CCD with as little frustration as possible, it is important to make the transition into the progression of the disease easy and stress free. The environment in which the dog lives is prevalent in the coping process. To keep the environment familiar to the dog, consider eliminating clutter around the house to prevent obstacles for the dog, keep commands short as to avoid confusion, immerse the dog in short, friendly play sessions, and develop a feeding and watering schedule that sticks to a routine. Avoid changing decorations or rearranging furniture in the house, as this will avoid confusion and problems with moving around. When these precautions are taken, the dog will have a higher chance of living longer with as little effects of CCD as possible.

== See also ==
- Feline cognitive dysfunction
