= Prostaglandin E synthase =

Class of enzymes

prostaglandin-E synthase
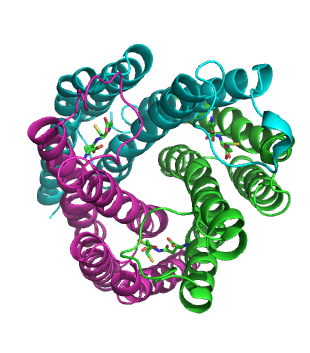
- human microsomal prostaglandin E synthase 1 with bound glutathione. PDB entry 3DWW

Identifiers
- EC no.: 5.3.99.3
- CAS no.: 52227-79-9

Databases
- BRENDA: enzyme data
- ExPASy: NiceZyme view
- KEGG: enzyme entry
- MetaCyc: metabolic pathway
- Rhea: reactions
- PDB structures: RCSB PDB PDBe PDBsum
- Gene Ontology: AmiGO / QuickGO
Search
- PMC: articles
- PubMed: articles
- NCBI: proteins

Prostaglandin E synthase (EC 5.3.99.3, or PGE synthase) is an enzyme involved in eicosanoid and glutathione metabolism, a member of MAPEG family. It generates prostaglandin E (PGE) from prostaglandin H2.

The synthase generating PGE2 is a membrane-associated protein.

Biosynthesis of eicosanoids.

== Isozymes ==
Humans express three prostaglandin-E synthase isozymes, each encoded by a separate gene:

prostaglandin E synthase (microsomal)

Identifiers
- Symbol: PTGES
- Alt. symbols: MGST1L1
- NCBI gene: 9536
- HGNC: 9599
- OMIM: 605172
- RefSeq: NM_004878
- UniProt: O14684

Other data
- Locus: Chr. 9 q34.3
Search for
- Structures: Swiss-model
- Domains: InterPro

prostaglandin E synthase 2 (microsomal)

Identifiers
- Symbol: PTGES2
- Alt. symbols: C9orf15
- NCBI gene: 80142
- HGNC: 17822
- OMIM: 608152
- RefSeq: NM_198939
- UniProt: Q9H7Z7

Other data
- Locus: Chr. 9 q34.12
Search for
- Structures: Swiss-model
- Domains: InterPro

prostaglandin E synthase 3 (cytosolic)

Identifiers
- Symbol: PTGES3
- Alt. symbols: p23, TEBP, cPGES
- NCBI gene: 10728
- HGNC: 16049
- OMIM: 607061
- RefSeq: NM_006601
- UniProt: Q15185

Other data
- Locus: Chr. 12 q13.13
Search for
- Structures: Swiss-model
- Domains: InterPro
