= Léon Bouveret =

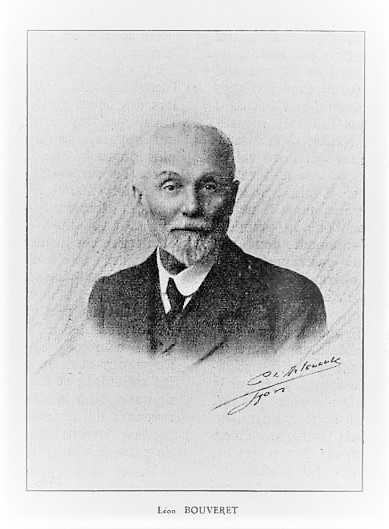
Léon Bouveret

Léon Bouveret (27 September 1850 – 1929) was a French internist born in Saint-Julien-sur-Reyssouze, a community in the department of Ain.

After receiving his doctorate in Paris in 1878, he became director of a clinic in Lyon that was run by professor Raphaël Lépine (1840–1919). Soon afterwards, he became associated with the Hôpitaux de Lyon, and in 1880 was appointed professeur agrégé. He resigned from the Hôpitaux de Lyon in 1900, although, he resumed his work there on a few occasions during World War I.

As a young physician, Bouveret played an important role in the fight against cholera in Ardèche. In 1889, he provided an early description of paroxysmal tachycardia (Bouveret's disease). The term "Bouveret's syndrome" is also named after him, being defined as a gastric outlet obstruction caused by a large gallstone migrating into the duodenal bulb through a biliogastric or bilioduodenal fistula.

He is remembered for his written efforts, in particular, "Traité des maladies de l'estomac" (Treatise on diseases of the stomach) and "La neurasthénie" (a publication on neurasthenia). With Raymond Tripier (1838–1916), he was the co-author of "La fièvre typhoïde traité par les bains froids" (1886), a book that recommended cold baths for the treatment of typhoid fever. Beginning in 1882, he became a member of the editorial staff of Lyon médicale, from which many of his works were published.
