= Feline cognitive dysfunction =

Cognitive disease affecting older cats

Feline cognitive dysfunction (FCD) is a cognitive disease prevalent in cats, directly related to the brain aging, leading to changes in awareness, deficits in learning and memory, and decreased responsiveness to stimuli. It is also known as cognitive dysfunction syndrome (CDS). Alzheimer's disease and dementia in humans are diseases with comparable symptoms and pathology.

== Causes ==
The exact cause of FCD is currently unknown. Genetic factors may predispose an animal to the condition. Signs of cognitive dysfunction may be connected with a prosencephalon or cerebrum problem.

== Symptoms ==
Older cats display more symptoms of the disease than younger cats. Behavioural symptoms usually become apparent in cats older than 10 years.

Main signs of FCD can be summarized with the acronym DISH:

- Disorientation,
- reduced social Interactions,
- Changes in Sleep patterns,
- loss of Housetraining skills.

Affected cats may wander aimlessly and look lost in space, seem restless and anxious, fail to recognize familiar faces such as their owners, caretakers or other cats in the clowder, display decreased interest in social interactions or increased aggression, experience insomnia, sometimes along with increased nocturnal vocalizations with no apparent reason.

== Other conditions with similar symptoms ==
Signs of FCD can be found in a number of other pathologies such as brain tumors or non brain-related diseases, which makes it important to exclude the possibility of other causes. For example, excessive urination may signify a kidney disease, and the look of numbness and detachment may be caused by a large variety of conditions, from pain to affected vision.

Arthritis may hinder a cat's ability to get into the litter box in time. Night-time vocalizing is relatively common in hyperthyroid cats or cats with hypertension, which can also cause retinal detachment and blindness, leading to anxiety and confusion. Progressively painful periodontal disease can discourage the cat from visiting its food bowl with the same enthusiasm it showed at a younger age.

If all other possible diseases are excluded, and MRI and analysis of cerebrospinal fluid fail to reveal a physical problem in the brain, then the problem may be treated by an animal behaviorist or veterinary psychiatrist.

== Prevention ==
As the cause of the disease is unknown, there is no way to be certain in prevention of the condition. However, the following measures are considered effective:

- absence of other animals in the house whose presence may be stressful to the cat,
- vitamin E-rich diet,
- conveniently accessible litter boxes,
- ramps for the stairs if the cat experiences difficulties going up and down,
- routine checkups with a veterinarian to detect a disease on early stage.

== Treatment ==
The disease is little-researched and thus considered incurable at the moment, but its symptoms can be managed with treatment. Cognitive dysfunction syndrome in dogs is an established diagnosis, but there has been limited research for cats and treatment options are limited. Drugs used for treatment of the disease have been approved for use in dogs. However, they are used off-label in treatment of cats. Early diagnosis improves results of long-term treatment.

Improving home environment may help in managing the disease. The treatment must always be arranged with a veterinarian for each particular animal, but the suggested measures include the following (veterinarian's advice is needed for right dosage of any supplements):

- species-appropriate diet rich in omega-3,
- physical and mental exercise, such as treat-release toys,
- S-adenosylmethionine supplement,
- medium-chain triglycerides (can improve brain energy metabolism and decrease the amyloid protein buildup that results in brain lesions in older pets),
- antioxidants, such as resveratrol (Japanese knotweed), which protects against free radical damage and beta-amyloid deposits, N-acetyl cysteine (NAC), phosphatidylserine and apoaequorin,
- vitamins E, C and B complex,
- melatonin as a sedation for nocturnal vocalizations and insomnia,

As the disease progresses, it gradually gets more difficult to ease, which increases the importance of detecting the diseases on the earliest possible stage.

Recommendations include limiting the access to the parts of the house that may present danger to the animal, set a consistent schedule for feeding, playing and interacting with the cat, "talking" with the animal and calling it by the name so that the familiar voice soothes it, and adding more litterboxes in case the cat experiences excessive urination or defecation.

== See also ==
- Canine cognitive dysfunction
- Cerebellar hypoplasia (non-human)
- Feline spongiform encephalopathy
