= Aurothioglucose =

Gold containing medicine

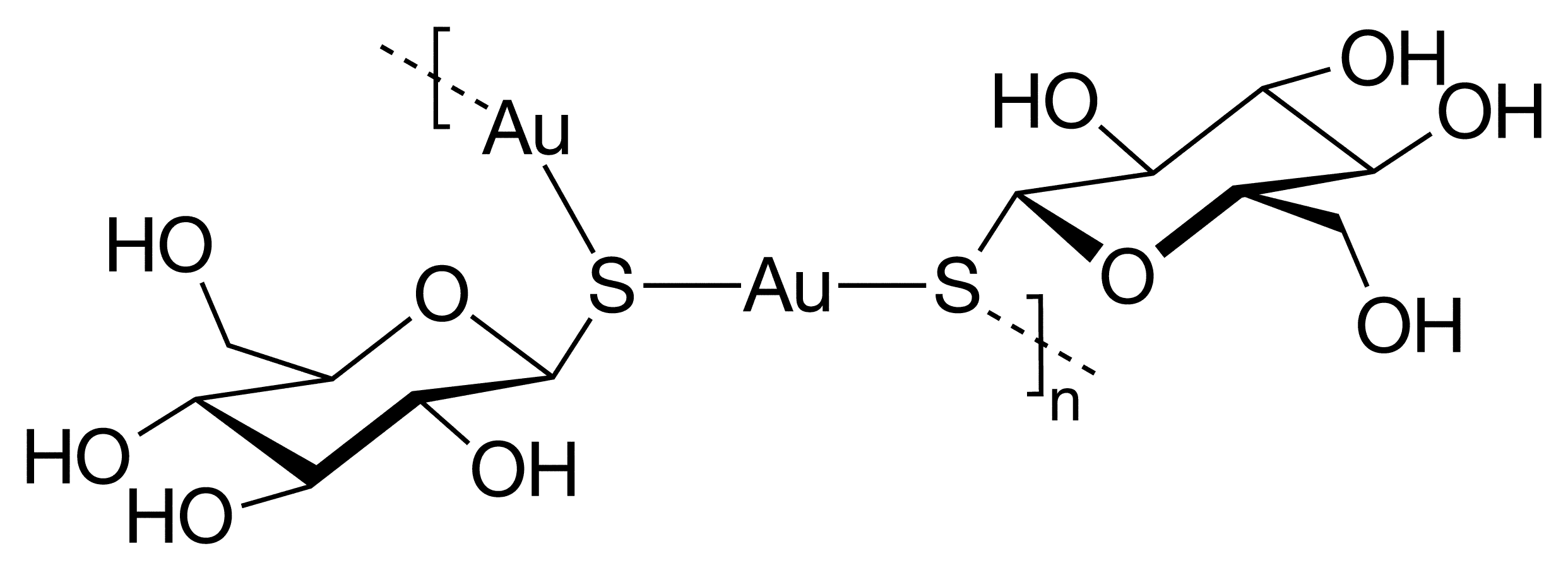

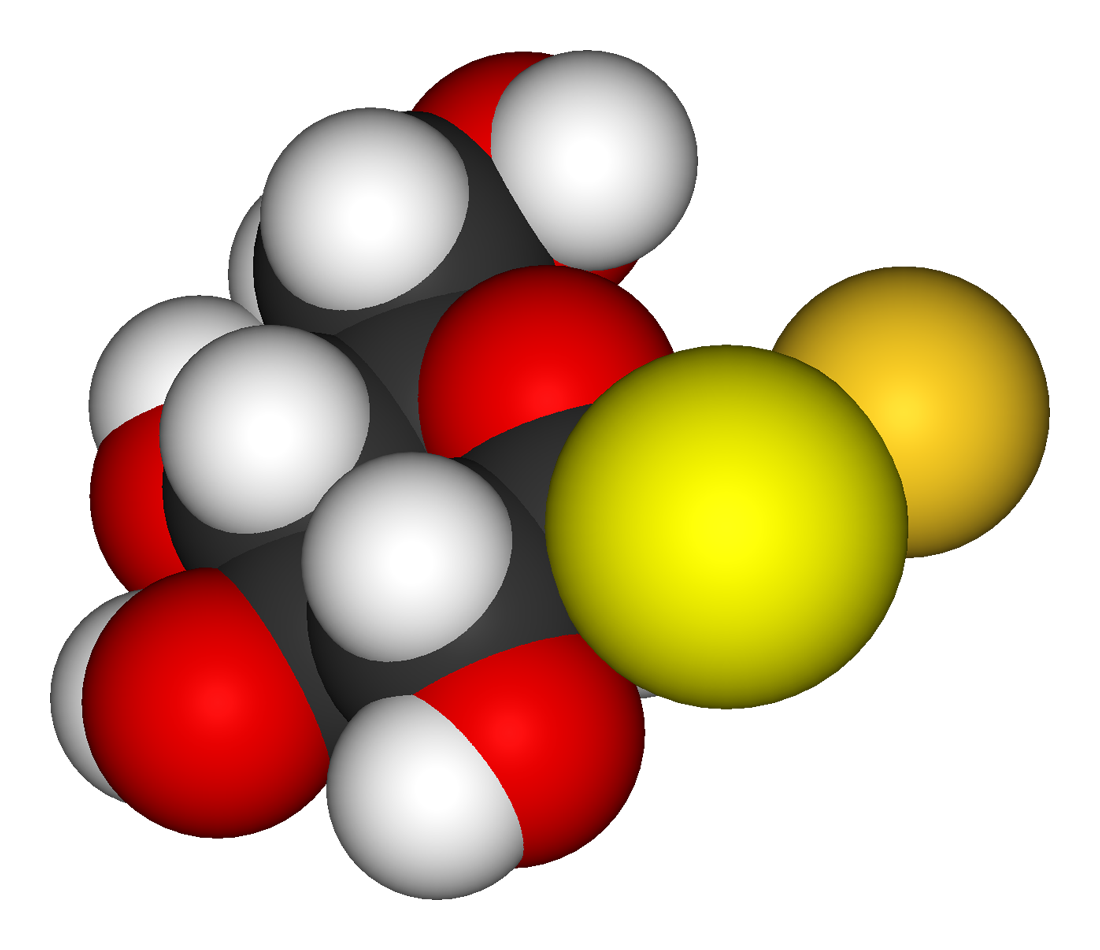

Clinical data
- Other names: Gold thioglucose, Solganal, Auromyose
- AHFS/Drugs.com: Consumer Drug Information
- Routes of administration: Intramuscular injection
- ATC code: M01CB04 (WHO)

Pharmacokinetic data
- Bioavailability: 0%

Identifiers
- IUPAC name: (1-thio-β-D-glucopyranosato-κS¹)gold(I)
- CAS Number: 12192-57-3
- PubChem CID: 6104
- ChemSpider: 16738764
- UNII: 2P2V9Q0E78
- ChEMBL: ChEMBL1697725
- CompTox Dashboard (EPA): DTXSID5046013
- ECHA InfoCard: 100.032.138

Chemical and physical data
- Formula: C_{6}H_{11}AuO_{5}S
- Molar mass: 392.18 g·mol^{−1}
- 3D model (JSmol): Interactive image
- SMILES: O[C@@H]1[C@@H](O)[C@H](O)[C@@H](CO)O[C@@H]1S[Au]
- InChI: InChI=1S/C6H12O5S.Au/c7-1-2-3(8)4(9)5(10)6(12)11-2;/h2-10,12H,1H2;/q;+1/p-1/t2-,3-,4+,5-,6-;/m1./s1; Key:XHVAWZZCDCWGBK-WYRLRVFGSA-M

Aurothioglucose, also known as gold thioglucose, is a chemical compound with the formula AuSC_{6}H_{11}O_{5}. This derivative of the sugar glucose was formerly used to treat rheumatoid arthritis.

== History ==
Throughout history, gold was used to cure diseases, although the efficacy was not established. In 1935, gold drugs were reported to be effective for the treatment of rheumatoid arthritis. Although many patients reacted positively to the drug, gold thioglucose was not uniformly effective.

Only one gold drug remains in active clinical use for this purpose in the United States: auranofin, sodium aurothiomalate (gold sodium thiomalate) and aurothioglucose were discontinued by their manufacturers in 2019 due to gold shortages, and the rising cost of gold.

In 2001, aurothioglucose was withdrawn from the Dutch market, where it had been the only injectable gold preparation available since 1943, forcing hospitals to change medication for a large number of patients to aurothiomalate. The drug had been in use for more than 70 years, and four years later the reasons for its sudden disappearance remained unclear.

It was discontinued from the US market in 2019, along with sodium aurothiomalate, leaving only generic Auranofin as the only gold salt on the US market.

== Medicinal chemistry ==
Gold thioglucose features gold in the oxidation state of +I, like other gold thiolates. It is a water-soluble, non-ionic species that is assumed to exist as a polymer. Under physiological conditions, an oxidation-reduction reaction leads to the formation of metallic gold and sulfinic acid derivative of thioglucose.

2 AuSTg → 2 Au + TgSSTg
TgSSTg + H_{2}O → TgSOH + TgSH
2 TgSOH → TgSO_{2}H + TgSH
Overall: 2 H_{2}O + 4 AuSTg → 4 Au + TgSO_{2}H + 3 TgSH

(where AuSTg = gold thioglucose, TgSSTg = thioglucose disulfide, TgSO_{2}H = sulfinic acid derivative of thioglucose)

== Preparation ==
Gold thioglucose can be prepared by treating gold bromide with thioglucose solution saturated with sulfur dioxide. Gold thioglucose is precipitated with methanol and recrystallized with water and methanol.

== Miscellaneous observations ==
In recent research, it was found that injection of gold thioglucose induces obesity in mice. Aurothioglucose has an interaction with the antimalarial medication hydroxychloroquine.

== See also ==
- Auranofin
