= MPGES-1 =

Protein-coding gene in the species Homo sapiens

PTGES
Available structures
PDB	Ortholog search: PDBe RCSB
PDB	List of PDB id codes 3DWW, 4WAB, 4AL1, 4BPM, 4YL1, 4YL3, 4YK5, 4AL0, 4YL0, 5BQI, 5BQG, 5BQH

Identifiers
- Aliases: PTGES, MGST-IV, MGST1-L1, MGST1L1, MPGES, PGES, PIG12, PP102, PP1294, TP53I12, mPGES-1, prostaglandin E synthase
- External IDs: OMIM: 605172; MGI: 1927593; HomoloGene: 3587; GeneCards: PTGES; OMA:PTGES - orthologs

Gene location (Human)
Chr.	Chromosome 9 (human)
Band	9q34.11	Start	129,738,331 bp
Band	9q34.11	End	129,753,042 bp

Gene location (Mouse)
Chr.	Chromosome 2 (mouse)
Band	2 B|2 21.75 cM	Start	30,779,483 bp
Band	2 B|2 21.75 cM	End	30,819,875 bp
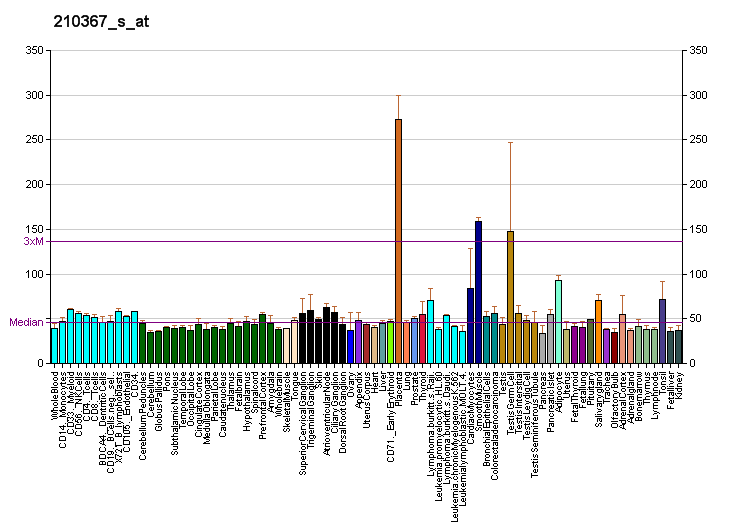

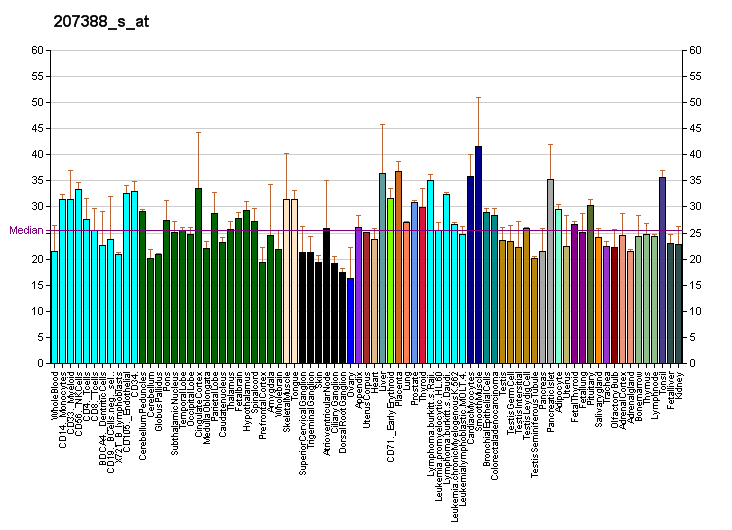
RNA expression pattern
Bgee	Human / Mouse (ortholog); Top expressed in: palpebral conjunctiva; nasal epithelium; gastric mucosa; seminal vesicula; cartilage tissue; skin of leg; mucosa of urinary bladder; skin of abdomen; nipple; minor salivary glands / Top expressed in: blastocyst; gastrula; morula; lactiferous gland; decidua; right kidney; cumulus cell; genital tubercle; lumbar spinal ganglion; granulocyte; More reference expression data
BioGPS	More reference expression data
Gene ontology
Molecular function	glutathione binding; isomerase activity; prostaglandin-E synthase activity; glutathione transferase activity
Cellular component	cytoplasm; integral component of membrane; endoplasmic reticulum membrane; intracellular membrane-bounded organelle; membrane; nuclear envelope lumen; perinuclear region of cytoplasm; mitochondrion
Biological process	prostaglandin metabolic process; response to cytokine; response to organic cyclic compound; response to retinoic acid; lipid metabolism; cyclooxygenase pathway; fatty acid metabolic process; response to calcium ion; response to lipopolysaccharide; fatty acid biosynthetic process; acute inflammatory response; prostaglandin biosynthetic process; chronic inflammatory response; negative regulation of cell population proliferation; signal transduction; glutathione metabolic process
Sources:Amigo / QuickGO
Orthologs
Species	Human	Mouse
Entrez	9536	64292
Ensembl	ENSG00000148344	ENSMUSG00000050737
UniProt	O14684	Q9JM51
RefSeq (mRNA)	NM_004878; NM_198797	NM_022415
RefSeq (protein)	NP_004869	NP_071860
Location (UCSC)	Chr 9: 129.74 – 129.75 Mb	Chr 2: 30.78 – 30.82 Mb
PubMed search
- Wikidata
View/Edit Human	View/Edit Mouse

Microsomal prostaglandin E synthase-1 (mPGES-1) or Prostaglandin E synthase is an enzyme that in humans is encoded by the PTGES gene.

The protein encoded by this gene is a glutathione-dependent prostaglandin E synthase. The expression of this gene has been shown to be induced by proinflammatory cytokine interleukin 1 beta (IL1B). Its expression can also be induced by tumor suppressor protein TP53, and may be involved in TP53-induced apoptosis.

Knockout studies in mice suggest that this gene may contribute to the pathogenesis of collagen-induced arthritis and mediate acute pain during inflammatory responses.

It is inhibited by crisdesalazine (AAD-2004; GedaCure).

== See also ==
- Prostaglandin E synthase
