= C7H16O =

The molecular formula C_{7}H_{16}O may refer to:

- tert-Amyl ethyl ether
- Heptanols
  - 1-Heptanol
  - 2-Heptanol
  - 3-Heptanol
  - 4-Heptanol
  - 3-Ethylpentan-3-ol
