= TTFB (chemical) =

Identifiers
CAS Number	2338-29-6
3D model (JSmol)	Interactive image
ChEBI	CHEBI:1744
ChEMBL	ChEMBL4572335
ChemSpider	67893
KEGG	C11322
PubChem CID	75357
CompTox Dashboard (EPA)	DTXSID30177936
- InChI: InChI=1S/C8HCl4F3N2/c9-1-2(10)4(12)6-5(3(1)11)16-7(17-6)8(13,14)15/h(H,16,17) Key: QLKDMIUEWFNEPV-UHFFFAOYSA-N
- SMILES: C12=C(C(=C(C(=C1Cl)Cl)Cl)Cl)N=C(N2)C(F)(F)F

Properties
Chemical formula	C_{8}HCl_{4}F_{3}N_{2}
Molar mass	323.91 g·mol^{−1}

Hazards
- Lethal dose or concentration (LD, LC)
LD_{50} (median dose)	23 mg/kg (mice, intraperitoneal)
- Except where otherwise noted, data are given for materials in their standard state (at 25 °C [77 °F], 100 kPa). Infobox references

TTFB (4,5,6,7-Tetrachloro-2-trifluoromethylbenzimidazole) is a halogenated benzimidazole derivative that acts as an uncoupling agent.

== See also ==
- Aetokthonotoxin
- Perfluorotriethylcarbinol
- SF-6847
