= Heptanol =

Heptanol may refer to any isomeric alcohols with the formula C_{7}H_{16}O:

- 1-Heptanol, an alcohol with a seven carbon chain and the structural formula of CH_{3}(CH_{2})_{6}OH
- 2-Heptanol, a secondary alcohol with the hydroxyl on the second carbon of the straight seven-carbon chain
- 3-Heptanol, an organic alcohol with the chemical formula C_{7}H_{16}O
- 4-Heptanol
- 3-Ethylpentan-3-ol

== See also ==
- C_{7}H_{16}O
