= C6H4N2O5 =

The molecular formula C_{6}H_{4}N_{2}O_{5} may refer to:

- Dinitrophenols
  - 2,3-Dinitrophenol
  - 2,4-Dinitrophenol
  - 2,5-Dinitrophenol
  - 2,6-Dinitrophenol
  - 3,4-Dinitrophenol
  - 3,5-Dinitrophenol
