= C10H12N2O5 =

The molecular formula C_{10}H_{12}N_{2}O_{5} (molar mass: 240.21 g/mol, exact mass: 240.0746 u) may refer to:

- Dinoseb, an herbicide also known as 6-sec-butyl-2,4-dinitrophenol
- Dinoterb, an herbicide
