= Nicholas Bachynsky =

Nicholas Bachynsky may refer to:

- Nicholas Bachynsky (politician), Canadian politician
- Nicholas Bachynsky (criminal), American convicted fraudster
