= LFER solvent coefficients (data page) =

Chemical data page

This page provides supplementary data and solvent coefficients for linear free-energy relationships.

== Partition between water and organic solvents ==
The LFER used to obtain partition coefficients that uses the systems below takes the form log P_{s} = c + eE + sS + aA + bB + vV

Coefficients for partition between water and solvents
wet/dry	solvent	c	e	s	a	b	v	source
w	1-butanol	0.376	0.434	-0.718	-0.097	-2.350	2.682
w	1-pentanol	0.185	0.367	-0.732	0.105	-3.100	3.395
w	1-hexanol	-0.006	0.460	-0.940	0.142	-3.284	3.792
w	1-heptanol	0.041	0.497	-0.976	0.030	-3.438	3.859
w	1-octanol	0.088	0.562	-1.054	0.034	-3.460	3.814
w	1-nonanol	-0.041	0.562	-1.103	0.090	-3.540	3.922
w	1-decanol	-0.136	0.542	-0.989	0.046	-3.722	3.996
w	isobutanol	0.249	0.480	-0.639	-0.050	-2.284	2.758
w/d	olely alcohol	-0.096	0.148	-0.841	-0.438	-4.040	4.125
w/d	dichloromethane	0.319	0.102	-0.187	-3.058	-4.090	4.324
w/d	trichloromethane	0.191	0.105	-0.403	-3.112	-3.514	4.395
w/d	tetrachloromethane	0.199	0.523	-1.159	-3.560	-4.594	4.618
w/d	1,2-dichloroethane	0.183	0.294	-0.134	-2.801	-4.291	4.180
w/d	1-chlorobutane	0.222	0.273	-0.569	-2.918	-4.883	4.456
w/d	butane	0.297	-0.005	-1.584	-3.188	-4.567	4.562
w/d	pentane	0.369	0.386	-1.568	-3.535	-5.215	4.514
w/d	hexane	0.333	0.56	-1.71	-3.578	-4.939	4.463
w/d	heptane	0.297	0.643	-1.755	-3.571	-4.946	4.488
w/d	octane	0.231	0.738	-1.84	-3.585	-4.907	4.502
w/d	nonane	0.240	0.619	-1.713	-3.532	-4.921	4.482
w/d	decane	0.186	0.722	-1.741	-3.449	-4.97	4.476
w/d	undecane	0.058	0.603	-1.661	-3.421	-5.120	4.619
w/d	dodecane	0.114	0.668	-1.644	-3.545	-5.006	4.459
w/d	hexadecane	0.087	0.667	-1.617	-3.587	-4.869	4.433
w/d	cyclohexane	0.159	0.784	-1.678	-3.740	-4.929	4.577
w/d	methylcyclohexane	0.246	0.782	-1.982	-3.517	-4.293	4.528
w/d	isooctane	0.32	0.511	-1.685	-3.687	-4.811	4.399
d	1-hexadecene	0.116	0.706	-1.616	-3.181	-4.796	4.322
d	1,9-decadiene	0.104	0.615	-1.796	-3.07	-4.291	4.518
w/d	benzene	0.142	0.464	-0.588	-3.099	-4.625	4.491
w/d	toluene	0.125	0.431	-0.644	-3.002	-4.748	4.524
w/d	ethylbenzene	0.093	0.467	-0.723	-3.001	-4.844	4.514
w/d	fluorobenzene	0.139	0.152	-0.374	-3.030	-4.601	4.540
w/d	chlorobenzene	0.065	0.381	-0.521	-3.183	-4.700	4.614
w/d	bromobenzene	-0.017	0.436	-0.424	-3.174	-4.558	4.445
w/d	iodobenzene	-0.192	0.298	-0.308	-3.213	-4.653	4.588
w/d	nitrobenzene	-0.196	0.537	0.042	-2.328	-4.608	4.314
w	diethyl ether	0.248	0.561	-1.016	-0.226	-4.553	4.075
w	diisopropyl ether	0.472	0.413	-0.745	-0.632	-5.251	4.059
w	dibutyl ether	0.252	0.677	-1.506	-0.807	-5.249	4.815
w	o-nitrophenyloctyl ether	0.121	0.600	-0.459	-2.246	-3.879	3.574
w	ethyl acetate	0.441	0.591	-0.699	-0.325	-4.261	3.666
w	n-butyl acetate	-0.475	0.428	-0.094	-0.241	-4.151	4.046
w	PGDP	0.256	0.501	-0.828	-1.022	-4.640	4.033
w	methyl isobutyl ketone	0.383	0.801	-0.831	-0.121	-4.441	3.876
w/d	olive oil	-0.035	0.574	-0.798	-1.422	-4.984	4.210
w/d	carbon disulfide	0.047	0.686	-0.943	-3.603	-5.818	4.921
w/d	isopropyl myristate	-0.605	0.930	-1.153	-1.682	-4.093	4.249
w/d	triolein	0.385	0.983	-2.083	-2.007	-3.452	4.072
d	methanol	0.276	0.334	-0.714	0.243	-3.32	3.549
d	ethanol/water(10:90)vol	-0.173	-0.023	-0.001	0.065	-0.372	0.454
d	ethanol/water(20:80)vol	-0.252	0.043	-0.040	0.096	-0.832	0.916
d	ethanol/water(30:70)vol	-0.269	0.107	-0.098	0.133	-1.316	1.414
d	ethanol/water(40:60)vol	-0.221	0.131	-0.159	0.171	-1.809	1.918
d	ethanol/water(50:50)vol	-0.142	0.124	-0.252	0.251	-2.275	2.415
d	ethanol/water(60:40)vol	-0.04	0.138	-0.335	0.293	-2.675	2.812
d	ethanol/water(70:30)vol	0.063	0.085	-0.368	0.311	-2.936	3.102
d	ethanol/water(80:20)vol	0.172	0.175	-0.465	0.26	-3.212	3.323
d	ethanol/water(90:10)vol	0.243	0.213	-0.575	0.262	-3.45	3.545
d	ethanol	0.222	0.471	-1.035	0.326	-3.596	3.857
d	1-propanol	0.139	0.405	-1.029	0.247	-3.767	3.986
d	1-butanol	0.165	0.401	-1.011	0.056	-3.958	4.044
d	1-pentanol	0.150	0.536	-1.229	0.141	-3.864	4.077
d	1-hexanol	0.115	0.492	-1.164	0.054	-3.978	4.131
d	1-heptanol	0.035	0.398	-1.063	0.002	-4.342	4.317
d	1-octanol	-0.034	0.489	-1.044	-0.024	-4.235	4.218
d	1-decanol	-0.058	0.616	-1.319	0.026	-4.153	4.279
d	2-propanol	0.099	0.343	-1.049	0.406	-3.827	4.033
d	2-methyl-1-propanol	0.188	0.354	-1.127	0.016	-3.568	3.968
d	2-butanol	0.127	0.253	-0.976	0.158	-3.882	4.114
d	2-methyl-2-propanol	0.211	0.171	-0.947	0.331	-4.085	4.109
d	3-methyl-1-butanol	0.073	0.36	-1.273	0.09	-3.77	4.399
d	2-pentanol	0.115	0.455	-1.331	0.206	-3.745	4.201
d	ethylene glycol	-0.243	0.695	-0.670	0.726	-2.399	2.670
d	trifluoroethanol	0.395	-0.094	-0.594	-1.280	-1.274	3.088
d	THF	0.223	0.363	-0.384	-0.238	-4.932	4.45
d	1,4-dioxane	0.123	0.347	-0.033	-0.582	-4.81	4.11
d	diethyl ether	0.350	0.358	-0.820	-0.588	-4.956	4.350
d	dibutyl ether	0.176	0.394	-0.985	-1.414	-5.357	4.524
d	methyl t-butyl ether	0.341	0.307	-0.817	-0.618	-5.097	4.425
d	methyl acetate	0.351	0.223	-0.150	-1.035	-4.527	3.972
d	ethyl acetate	0.328	0.369	-0.446	-0.700	-4.904	4.150
d	butyl acetate	0.248	0.356	-0.501	-0.867	-4.973	4.281
d	propanone	0.313	0.312	-0.121	-0.608	-4.753	3.942
d	butanone	0.246	0.256	-0.080	-0.767	-4.855	4.148
d	cyclohexanone	0.038	0.225	0.058	-0.976	-4.842	4.315
d	dimethylformamide	-0.305	-0.058	0.343	0.358	-4.865	4.486
d	dimethylacetamide	-0.271	0.084	0.209	0.915	-5.003	4.557
d	diethylacetamide	0.213	0.034	0.089	1.342	-5.084	4.088
d	dibutylformamide	0.332	0.302	-0.436	0.358	-4.902	3.952
d	N-methylpyrolidinone	0.147	0.532	0.225	0.840	-4.794	3.674
d	N-methyl-2-piperidone	0.056	0.332	0.257	1.556	-5.035	3.983
d	N-formylmorpholine	-0.032	0.696	-0.062	0.014	-4.092	3.405
d	N-methylformamide	0.114	0.407	-0.287	0.542	-4.085	3.471
d	N-ethylformamide	0.220	0.034	-0.166	0.935	-4.589	3.730
d	N-methylacetamide	0.090	0.205	-0.172	1.305	-4.589	3.833
d	N-ethylacetamide	0.284	0.128	-0.442	1.180	-4.728	3.856
d	formamide	-0.171	0.070	0.308	0.589	-3.152	2.432
d	acetonitrile	0.413	0.077	0.326	-1.566	-4.391	3.364
d	benzonitrile	0.097	0.285	0.059	-1.605	-4.562	4.028
d	nitromethane	0.023	-0.091	0.793	-1.463	-4.364	3.460
d	DMSO	-0.194	0.327	0.791	1.260	-4.540	3.361
d	tributylphosphate	0.327	0.570	-0.837	-1.069	-4.333	3.919
d	m-xylene	0.122	0.377	-0.603	-2.981	-4.961	4.535
d	o-xylene	0.083	0.518	-0.813	-2.884	-4.821	4.559
d	p-xylene	0.166	0.477	-0.812	-2.939	-4.874	4.532
d	sulfolane	0.000	0.147	0.601	-0.381	-4.541	3.29
n/a	gas–water	-0.994	0.577	2.549	3.813	4.841	-0.869
n/a	gas–water (37C)	-1.064	0.588	2.572	3.591	4.341	-0.971
n/a	gas–saline (37C)	-1.203	0.486	2.437	4.031	4.316	-0.745
wet/dry	solvent	c	e	s	a	b	v	source

== Partition between gas phase and organic solvents ==
The LFER used to obtain partition coefficients that uses the systems below takes the form log K_{s} = c + eE + sS + aA + bB + lL

Coefficients for partition between given gas phase and solvent
wet/dry	solvent	c	e	s	a	b	l	source
w	Butan-1-ol	-0.095	0.262	1.396	3.405	2.565	0.523
w	Pentan-1-ol	-0.107	-0.001	1.188	3.614	1.671	0.721
w	Hexan-1-ol	-0.302	-0.046	0.880	3.609	1.785	0.824
w	Heptan-1-ol	-0.159	0.018	0.825	3.539	1.425	0.830
w	Octan-1-ol	-0.222	0.088	0.701	3.478	1.477	0.851
w	Nonan-1-ol	-0.197	0.141	0.694	3.616	1.299	0.827
w	Decan-1-ol	-0.302	0.233	0.741	3.531	1.177	0.835
w	Isobutanol	0.000	0.000	0.000	0.000	0.000	0.000
w/d	Oleyl alcohol	-0.268	-0.392	0.800	3.117	0.978	0.918
w/d	Dichloromethane	0.192	-0.572	1.492	0.460	0.847	0.965
w/d	Trichloromethane	0.157	-0.560	1.259	0.374	1.333	0.976
w/d	Tetrachloromethane	0.217	-0.435	0.554	0.000	0.000	1.069
w/d	1,2-Dichloroethane	0.017	-0.337	1.600	0.774	0.637	0.921
w/d	1-Chlorobutane	0.130	-0.581	1.114	0.724	0.000	1.016
w/d	Butane	0.291	-0.360	0.091	0.000	0.000	0.959
w/d	Pentane	0.335	-0.276	0.000	0.000	0.000	0.968
w/d	Hexane	0.292	-0.169	0.000	0.000	0.000	0.979
w/d	Heptane	0.275	-0.162	0.000	0.000	0.000	0.983
w/d	Octane	0.215	-0.049	0.000	0.000	0.000	0.967
w/d	Nonane	0.200	-0.145	0.000	0.000	0.000	0.980
w/d	Decane	0.156	-0.143	0.000	0.000	0.000	0.989
w/d	Undecane	0.113	0.000	0.000	0.000	0.000	0.971
w/d	Dodecane	0.053	0.000	0.000	0.000	0.000	0.986
w/d	Hexadecane	0.000	0.000	0.000	0.000	0.000	1.000
w/d	Cyclohexane	0.163	-0.110	0.000	0.000	0.000	1.013
w/d	Methylcyclohexane	0.318	-0.215	0.000	0.000	0.000	1.012
w/d	Isooctane	0.264	-0.230	0.000	0.000	0.000	0.975
w/d	Benzene	0.107	-0.313	1.053	0.457	0.169	1.020
w/d	Toluene	0.121	-0.222	0.938	0.467	0.099	1.012
w/d	Fluorobenzene	0.181	-0.621	1.432	0.647	0.000	0.986
w/d	Chlorobenzene	0.064	-0.399	1.151	0.313	0.171	1.032
w/d	Bromobenzene	-0.064	-0.326	1.261	0.323	0.292	1.002
w/d	Iodobenzene	-0.171	-0.192	1.197	0.245	0.245	1.002
w/d	Nitrobenzene	-0.295	0.121	1.682	1.247	0.370	0.915
w	Diethylether	0.206	-0.169	0.873	3.402	0.000	0.882
w	Dipropylether	0.065	-0.202	0.776	3.074	0.000	0.948
w	Diisopropylether	0.114	-0.032	0.685	3.108	0.000	0.940
w	Dibutylether	0.369	-0.216	0.026	2.626	-0.499	1.124
w	Ethyl acetate	0.130	0.031	1.202	3.199	0.463	0.828
w	n-Butyl acetate	-0.664	0.061	1.671	3.373	0.824	0.832
w	Methyl isobutyl ketone	0.244	0.183	0.987	3.418	0.323	0.854
w/d	Olive oil	-0.159	-0.277	0.904	1.695	-0.090	0.876
w/d	Carbon disulfide	0.101	0.251	0.177	0.027	0.095	1.068
w/d	Triolein	0.147	0.254	-0.246	1.520	1.473	0.918
d	Methanol	-0.004	-0.215	1.173	3.701	1.432	0.769
d	Ethanol	0.012	-0.206	0.789	3.635	1.311	0.853
d	Propan-1-ol	-0.028	-0.185	0.648	4.022	1.043	0.869
d	Butan-1-ol	-0.039	-0.276	0.539	3.781	0.995	0.934
d	Pentan-1-ol	-0.042	-0.277	0.526	3.779	0.983	0.932
d	Hexan-1-ol	-0.035	-0.298	0.626	3.726	0.729	0.936
d	Heptan-1-ol	-0.062	-0.168	0.429	3.541	1.181	0.927
d	Octan-1-ol	-0.147	-0.214	0.561	3.507	0.749	0.943
d	Decan-1-ol	-0.136	-0.068	0.325	3.674	0.767	0.947
d	Propan-2-ol	-0.062	-0.327	0.707	4.024	1.072	0.886
d	Isobutanol	0.012	-0.407	0.670	3.645	1.283	0.895
d	s-Butanol	-0.017	-0.376	0.852	3.740	1.161	0.867
d	t-Butanol	0.071	-0.538	0.818	3.951	0.823	0.905
d	3-Methylbutan-1-ol	-0.014	-0.341	0.525	3.666	1.096	0.925
d	2-Pentanol	-0.031	-0.325	0.496	3.792	1.024	0.934
d	Ethylene glycol	-0.876	0.278	1.431	4.584	2.525	0.558
d	Trifluoroethanol	-0.092	-0.547	1.339	2.213	3.807	0.645
d	Diethylether	0.288	-0.347	0.775	2.985	0.000	0.973
d	THF	0.189	-0.347	1.238	3.289	0.000	0.982
d	Dioxane	-0.034	-0.354	1.674	3.021	0.000	0.919
d	Dibutylether	0.165	-0.421	0.760	2.102	-0.664	1.002
d	Methyl t-butyl ether	0.278	-0.489	0.801	2.495	0.000	0.993
d	Methyl acetate	0.129	-0.447	1.675	2.625	0.213	0.874
d	Ethyl acetate	0.182	-0.352	1.316	2.891	0.000	0.916
d	n-Butyl acetate	0.147	-0.414	1.212	2.623	0.000	0.954
d	Propanone	0.127	-0.387	1.733	3.060	0.000	0.866
d	Butanone	0.112	-0.474	1.671	2.878	0.000	0.916
d	Cyclohexanone	-0.086	-0.441	1.725	2.786	0.000	0.957
d	Dimethylformamide	-0.391	-0.869	2.107	3.774	0.000	1.011
d	Dimethylacetamide	-0.308	-0.736	1.802	4.361	0.000	1.028
d	Diethylacetamide	-0.075	-0.434	1.911	4.801	0.000	0.899
d	Dibutylformamide	-0.002	-0.239	1.402	4.029	0.000	0.900
d	N-Methylpyrrolidinone	-0.128	-0.029	2.217	4.429	0.000	0.777
d	N-Methyl-2-piperidone	-0.264	-0.171	2.086	5.056	0.000	0.883
d	N-Formylmorpholine	-0.437	0.024	2.631	4.318	0.000	0.712
d	N-Methylformamide	-0.249	-0.142	1.661	4.147	0.817	0.739
d	N-Ethylformamide	-0.220	-0.302	1.743	4.498	0.480	0.824
d	N-Methylacetamide	-0.197	-0.175	1.608	4.867	0.375	0.837
d	N-Ethylacetamide	-0.018	-0.157	1.352	4.588	0.357	0.824
d	Formamide	-0.800	0.310	2.292	4.130	1.933	0.442
d	Acetonitrile	-0.007	-0.595	2.461	2.085	0.418	0.738
d	Nitromethane	-0.340	-0.297	2.689	2.193	0.514	0.728
d	DMSO	-0.556	-0.223	2.903	5.036	0.000	0.719
d	Tributylphosphate	0.097	-0.098	1.103	2.411	0.588	0.844
n/a	Gas–water	-1.271	0.822	2.743	3.904	4.814	-0.213
n/a	Gas–water (37C)	-1.347	0.928	2.795	3.717	4.297	-0.254
n/a	Gas–saline (37C)	-1.442	0.765	2.611	4.084	4.316	-0.194
wet/dry	solvent	c	e	s	a	b	l	source

This box:
- Except where noted otherwise, data relate to Standard temperature and pressure.
- Reliability of data general note.
