= Dinifedriton =

Chemical compound

Clinical data
- Other names: HU6

Legal status
- Legal status: Investigational

Identifiers
- IUPAC name: 5-[(2,4-Dinitrophenoxy)methyl]-1-methyl-2-nitroimidazole
- CAS Number: 2231311-68-3
- PubChem CID: 135205989
- ChemSpider: 128784125
- UNII: 2U87AJU2ZZ

Chemical and physical data
- Formula: C_{11}H_{9}N_{5}O_{7}
- Molar mass: 323.221 g·mol^{−1}
- 3D model (JSmol): Interactive image
- SMILES: CN1C(=CN=C1[N+](=O)[O-])COC2=C(C=C(C=C2)[N+](=O)[O-])[N+](=O)[O-]
- InChI: InChI=1S/C11H9N5O7/c1-13-8(5-12-11(13)16(21)22)6-23-10-3-2-7(14(17)18)4-9(10)15(19)20/h2-5H,6H2,1H3; Key:LRJQZGXEGNOHBH-UHFFFAOYSA-N

Dinifedriton, also known as HU6, is a prodrug of the mitochondrial uncoupler 2,4-dinitrophenol (DNP) that is intended to "minimize the rapid absorption and high peak blood concentrations of DNP to provide a wider therapeutic index and improve safety." Developed by Rivus Pharmaceuticals, the drug is tested to reduce weight and liver fat in humans with risk factors for metabolic dysfunction-associated steatohepatitis. In a phase 2a trial, the higher dosage levels reduced liver fat on average by more than 30 percent and also reduced body weight significantly. A phase 2b trial was launched in late 2023. A phase 2b trial in patients with metabolic dysfunction-associated steatohepatitis was subsequently initiated. Data from this study are expected to be reported in 2025. Additionally, a phase 2a study was performed in patients suffering from heart failure with preserved ejection fraction, a disease that is mediated by visceral fat and obesity. The study achieved the primary endpoint of weight loss, as well as a number of secondary endpoints.
