= Malonoben =

Names
- Preferred IUPAC name [(3,5-di-tert-Butyl-4-hydroxyphenyl)methylidene]propanedinitrile
- Other names Tyrphostin A9; SF-6847; GCP5126; and AG-17

Identifiers
CAS Number	10537-47-0
3D model (JSmol)	Interactive image
ChEBI	CHEBI:82168
ChEMBL	ChEMBL78150
ChemSpider	5412
ECHA InfoCard	100.162.608
EC Number	634-647-0
KEGG	C19039
PubChem CID	5614
UNII	87TE8MRS65
CompTox Dashboard (EPA)	DTXSID1042106
- InChI: InChI=1S/C18H22N2O/c1-17(2,3)14-8-12(7-13(10-19)11-20)9-15(16(14)21)18(4,5)6/h7-9,21H,1-6H3 Key: MZOPWQKISXCCTP-UHFFFAOYSA-N; InChI=1/C18H22N2O/c1-17(2,3)14-8-12(7-13(10-19)11-20)9-15(16(14)21)18(4,5)6/h7-9,21H,1-6H3 Key: MZOPWQKISXCCTP-UHFFFAOYAY
- SMILES: CC(C)(C)c1cc(cc(c1O)C(C)(C)C)C=C(C#N)C#N

Properties
Chemical formula	C_{18}H_{22}N_{2}O
Molar mass	282.387 g·mol^{−1}
Melting point	142 °C (288 °F; 415 K) ±1°

Hazards
- GHS labelling
Pictograms	(GHS06: Toxic)
Signal word	Danger
Hazard statements	H301, H311, H331
Precautionary statements	P261, P264, P270, P271, P280, P301+P310, P302+P352, P304+P340, P311, P312, P321, P322, P330, P361, P363, P403+P233, P405, P501
- Except where otherwise noted, data are given for materials in their standard state (at 25 °C [77 °F], 100 kPa). Infobox references

Malonoben (also known as tyrphostin A9, SF-6847, GCP5126, and AG-17) is an uncoupling agent/protonophore. As of 1974 when it was discovered, it was considered the most powerful agent of this type, with a potency over 1800 times that of 2,4-dinitrophenol - the prototypical uncoupling agent - and about 3 times as potent as the superpotent niclosamide analog 5-chloro-3-tert-butyl-2'-chloro-4'-nitrosalicylanilide.
