= Protonophore =

A protonophore, also known as a proton translocator, is an ionophore that moves protons across lipid bilayers or other type of membranes. This would otherwise not occur as protons (H^{+}) have positive charge and have hydrophilic properties, making them unable to cross without a channel or transporter. Protonophores are generally aromatic compounds with a negative charge, that are both hydrophobic and capable of distributing the negative charge over a number of atoms by π-orbitals which delocalize a proton's charge when it attaches to the molecule. Both the neutral and the charged protonophore can diffuse across the lipid bilayer by passive diffusion and simultaneously facilitate proton transport. Protonophores uncouple oxidative phosphorylation via a decrease in the membrane potential of the inner membrane of mitochondria. They stimulate mitochondrial respiration and heat production. Protonophores (uncouplers) are often used in biochemistry research to help explore the bioenergetics of chemiosmotic and other membrane transport processes. It has been reported that the protonophore has antibacterial activity by perturbing bacterial proton motive force.

Representative anionic protonophores include:

- 2,4-dinitrophenol
- Carbonyl cyanide-p-trifluoromethoxyphenylhydrazone (FCCP)
- Carbonyl cyanide m-chlorophenyl hydrazone (CCCP)

Representative cationic protonophores include:

- C4R1 (a short-chain alkyl derivative of rhodamine 19)
- Ellipticine

Representative zwitterionic protonophores include:

- mitoFluo (10-[2-(3-hydroxy-6-oxo-xanthen-9-yl)benzoyl]oxydecyl-triphenyl-phosphonium bromide)
- PP6 (2-(2-Hydroxyaryl)hexylphosphonium bromide)

== Mechanism of action ==
The facilitated transport of protons across the biological membrane by anionic protonophore is achieved as follows.

1. The anionic form of the protonophore (P^{−}) is adsorbed onto one side (Positive) of the biological membrane.
2. Protons (H^{+}) from the aqueous solution combine with the anion (P^{−}) to produce the neutral form (PH)
3. PH diffuses across the biological membrane and dissociates into H^{+} and P^{−} on the other side.
4. This H^{+} is released from the biological membrane into the other aqueous solution
5. P^{−} returns to the first side of the biological membrane by electrophoresis (its electrostatic attraction to the positive side of the membrane).

== See also ==
- Chemiosmosis
