= C6H3N2O5 =

C_{6}H_{3}N_{2}O_{5}^{−} as a molecular formula can represent any of:

- Dinitrophenolates
  - 2,3-Dinitrophenolate
  - 2,4-Dinitrophenolate
- 2-Hydroxy-5-nitrophenyl nitrite, anion(1−)
