= Dinitrophenol =

Dinitrophenols are chemical compounds which are nitro derivatives of phenol.

There are six isomers of dinitrophenol:

Chemical structure of 2,4-Dinitrophenol

- 2,3-Dinitrophenol
- 2,4-Dinitrophenol
- 2,5-Dinitrophenol
- 2,6-Dinitrophenol
- 3,4-Dinitrophenol
- 3,5-Dinitrophenol

Dinitrophenols also form the core structure of some herbicides, which are collectively referred to as dinitrophenol herbicides, including:

Chemical structure of Dinoterb

- Dinofenate
- Dinoprop
- Dinosam
- Dinoseb
- Dinoterb
- DNOC
- Etinofen
- Medinoterb
