= OR2J2 =

Protein-coding gene in the species Homo sapiens

Identifiers
- Aliases: OR2J2, OR6-19, OR6-8, OR6.3.8, ORL684, dJ80I19.4, hs6M1-6, olfactory receptor family 2 subfamily J member 2
- External IDs: MGI: 2177520; GeneCards: OR2J2

Gene location (Human)
Chr.	Chromosome 6 (human)
Band	6p22.1	Start	29,170,907 bp
Band	6p22.1	End	29,175,811 bp

Gene location (Mouse)
Chr.	Chromosome 17 (mouse)
Band	17|17 B1	Start	38,614,418 bp
Band	17|17 B1	End	38,618,461 bp
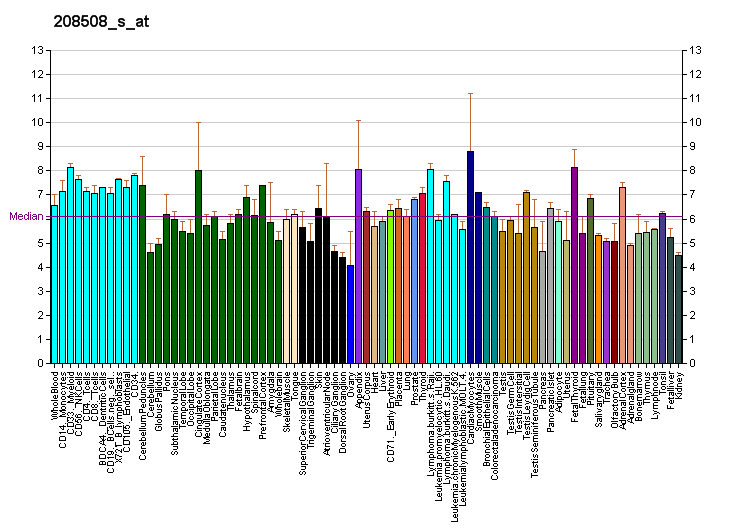

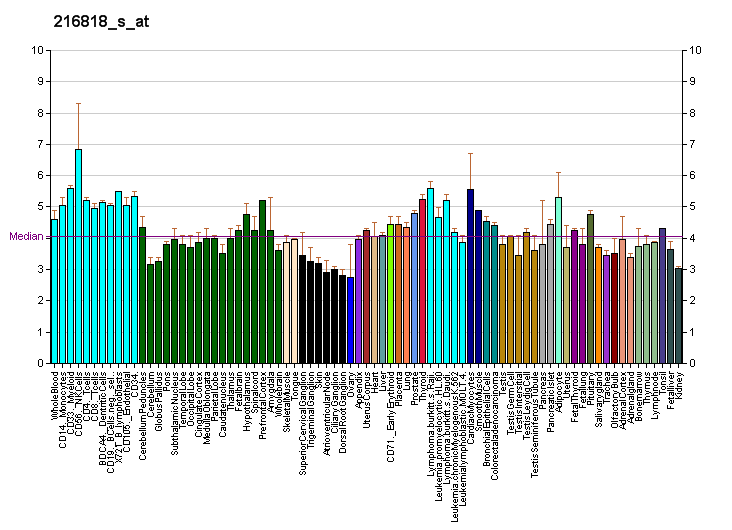
RNA expression pattern
Bgee	Human / Mouse (ortholog); Top expressed in: testicle; fallopian tube; right testis; left testis; appendix; hippocampus proper; hypothalamus; caudate nucleus / n/a; More reference expression data
BioGPS	More reference expression data
Gene ontology
Molecular function	G protein-coupled receptor activity; olfactory receptor activity; signal transducer activity
Cellular component	integral component of membrane; plasma membrane; membrane
Biological process	sensory perception of smell; signal transduction; response to stimulus; detection of chemical stimulus involved in sensory perception of smell; G protein-coupled receptor signaling pathway
Sources:Amigo / QuickGO
Orthologs
Databases	NCBI: entry; OMA: entry
Species	Human	Mouse
Entrez	26707	258481
Ensembl	ENSG00000204700	ENSMUSG00000054940
UniProt	O76002	Q8VFC2
RefSeq (mRNA)	NM_030905	NM_146488
RefSeq (protein)	NP_112167	NP_666699
Location (UCSC)	Chr 6: 29.17 – 29.18 Mb	Chr 17: 38.61 – 38.62 Mb
PubMed search
- Wikidata
View/Edit Human	View/Edit Mouse

Olfactory receptor 2J2 is a protein that in humans is encoded by the OR2J2 gene.

Olfactory receptors interact with odorant molecules in the nose, to initiate a neuronal response that triggers the perception of a smell. The olfactory receptor proteins are members of a large family of G-protein-coupled receptors (GPCR) arising from single coding-exon genes. Olfactory receptors share a 7-transmembrane domain structure with many neurotransmitter and hormone receptors and are responsible for the recognition and G protein-mediated transduction of odorant signals. The olfactory receptor gene family is the largest in the genome. The nomenclature assigned to the olfactory receptor genes and proteins for this organism is independent of other organisms.

== Ligands ==
Agonists include:

- 1-Octanol
- 1-Nonanol
- 1-Decanol
- 1-Heptanol
- Coumarin

== See also ==
- Olfactory receptor
