= DNOC =

DNOC may refer to:

- Dinitro-ortho-cresol
- Direct Notice Of Cancellation, an insurance term
- Defence Network Operations Centre at HMAS Harman, Canberra
