= FCCP =

FCCP may be:

- Fellow of the College of Chest Physicians, a Fellow of the American College of Chest Physicians
- Fellow of the American College of Clinical Pharmacy, a Fellow of the American College of Clinical Pharmacy
- Fellow of the Ceylon College of Physicians, a Fellow of the Ceylon College of Physicians, Sri Lanka
- Carbonyl cyanide-p-trifluoromethoxyphenylhydrazone, a hydrazone compound used in biochemistry
