= 2-Heptanol =

Names
- Preferred IUPAC name Heptan-2-ol
- Other names s-Heptyl alcohol

Identifiers
CAS Number	543-49-7
3D model (JSmol)	Interactive image
ChEBI	CHEBI:88815
ChEMBL	ChEMBL449522
ChemSpider	10511
ECHA InfoCard	100.008.041
PubChem CID	10976
UNII	E12FIG07JK
CompTox Dashboard (EPA)	DTXSID1047158
- InChI: InChI=1S/C7H16O/c1-3-4-5-6-7(2)8/h7-8H,3-6H2,1-2H3 Key: CETWDUZRCINIHU-UHFFFAOYSA-N; InChI=1/C7H16O/c1-3-4-5-6-7(2)8/h7-8H,3-6H2,1-2H3 Key: CETWDUZRCINIHU-UHFFFAOYAL
- SMILES: OC(C)CCCCC

Properties
Chemical formula	C_{7}H_{16}O
Molar mass	116.204 g·mol^{−1}
Density	0.817 g/mL
Melting point	−30.2 °C (−22.4 °F; 243.0 K)
Boiling point	159 °C (318 °F; 432 K)
Solubility in water	3.3 g/L
Solubility	soluble in ethanol, diethyl ether
Viscosity	3.955 mPa·s

Hazards
Flash point	71 °C (160 °F; 344 K)
- Except where otherwise noted, data are given for materials in their standard state (at 25 °C [77 °F], 100 kPa). verify (what is ?) Infobox references

2-Heptanol is a chemical compound which is an isomer of heptanol. It is a secondary alcohol with the hydroxyl on the second carbon of the straight seven-carbon chain. The compound is flammable and irritant, and through inhalation, ingestion or though skin it can enter into the body.

2-Heptanol is chiral, so (R)- and (S)-isomers exist.

== Synthesis ==
2-Heptanol can be synthesized by catalytic hydrogenation of 2-heptanone using metal catalysts such as nickel, palladium, or cobalt.

CH_{3}CO(CH_{2})_{4}CH_{3}+H_{2}→CH_{3}CH(OH)(CH_{2})_{4}CH_{3}

== Occurrence and uses ==
2-Heptanol has been identified as a volatile component in a variety of foods and natural products, including cheddar cheese, grape, tomato, strawberry, coconut and beer. It also occurs in clove oil, tea, and corn. The compound is used in flavor and fragrance formulations and as a solvent for synthetic resins. Recent studies have additionally investigated its antifungal activity against plant pathogens such as Botrytis cinerea.

== See also ==
- 1-Heptanol
- 3-Heptanol
- 4-Heptanol
