= BAM15 =

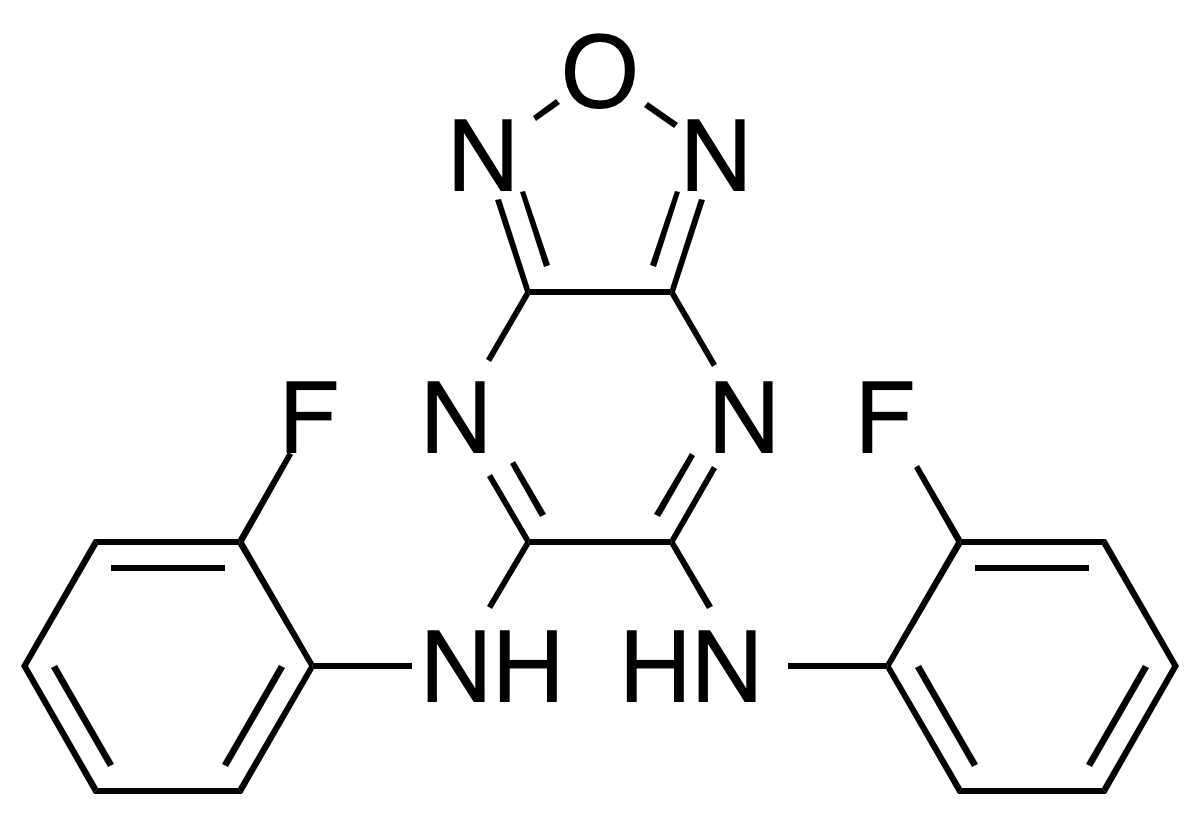

Names
- Preferred IUPAC name N^{5},N^{6}-Bis(2-fluorophenyl)[2,1,3]oxadiazolo[4,5-b]pyrazine-5,6-diamine

Identifiers
CAS Number	210302-17-3
3D model (JSmol)	Interactive image
ChEBI	CHEBI:233585
ChEMBL	ChEMBL3627755
ChemSpider	491757
PubChem CID	565708
- InChI: InChI=1S/C16H10F2N6O/c17-9-5-1-3-7-11(9)19-13-14(20-12-8-4-2-6-10(12)18)22-16-15(21-13)23-25-24-16/h1-8H,(H,19,21,23)(H,20,22,24) Key: OEGJBRZAJRPPHL-UHFFFAOYSA-N
- SMILES: C1=CC=C(C(=C1)NC2=NC3=NON=C3N=C2NC4=CC=CC=C4F)F

Properties
Chemical formula	C_{16}H_{10}F_{2}N_{6}O
Molar mass	340.294 g·mol^{−1}
- Except where otherwise noted, data are given for materials in their standard state (at 25 °C [77 °F], 100 kPa). Infobox references

BAM15 is a novel mitochondrial protonophore uncoupler capable of protecting mammals from acute renal ischemic-reperfusion injury and cold-induced kidney tubule damage. It is being studied for the treatment of obesity, sepsis, and cancer.
