= Carbonyl cyanide m-chlorophenyl hydrazone =

Chemical compound

Names
- Preferred IUPAC name N-(4-Chlorophenyl)carbonohydrazonoyl dicyanide

Identifiers
CAS Number	555-60-2
3D model (JSmol)	Interactive image
ChEBI	CHEBI:3259
ChEMBL	ChEMBL224214
ChemSpider	2504
ECHA InfoCard	100.008.277
KEGG	C11164
MeSH	CCCP
PubChem CID	2603
UNII	4D4NW27CG5
CompTox Dashboard (EPA)	DTXSID7040990
- InChI: InChI=1S/C9H5ClN4/c10-7-2-1-3-8(4-7)13-14-9(5-11)6-12/h1-4,13H Key: UGTJLJZQQFGTJD-UHFFFAOYSA-N; InChI=1/C9H5ClN4/c10-7-2-1-3-8(4-7)13-14-9(5-11)6-12/h1-4,13H Key: UGTJLJZQQFGTJD-UHFFFAOYAQ
- SMILES: Clc1cc(N\N=C(/C#N)C#N)ccc1

Properties
Chemical formula	C_{9}H_{5}ClN_{4}
Molar mass	204.616 g/mol
- Except where otherwise noted, data are given for materials in their standard state (at 25 °C [77 °F], 100 kPa). verify (what is ?) Infobox references

Carbonyl cyanide m-chlorophenyl hydrazone (CCCP; also known as [(3-chlorophenyl)hydrazono]malononitrile) is a chemical inhibitor of oxidative phosphorylation. It is a nitrile, hydrazone and protonophore. In general, CCCP causes the gradual destruction of living cells and death of the organism, although mild doses inducing partial decoupling have been shown to increase median and maximum lifespan in C. elegans models, suggesting a degree of hormesis. CCCP causes an uncoupling of the proton gradient that is established during the normal activity of electron carriers in the electron transport chain. The chemical acts essentially as an ionophore and reduces the ability of ATP synthase to function optimally. It is routinely used as an experimental uncoupling agent in cell and molecular biology, particularly in the study of mitophagy, where it was integral in discovering the role of the Parkinson's disease-associated ubiquitin ligase Parkin. Outside of its effects on mitochondria, CCCP may also disrupt lysosomal degradation during autophagy.

== See also ==
- Carbonyl cyanide-p-trifluoromethoxyphenylhydrazone (FCCP)
