= 2,4-Dinitrophenol =

Chemical compound

- Chemical structure

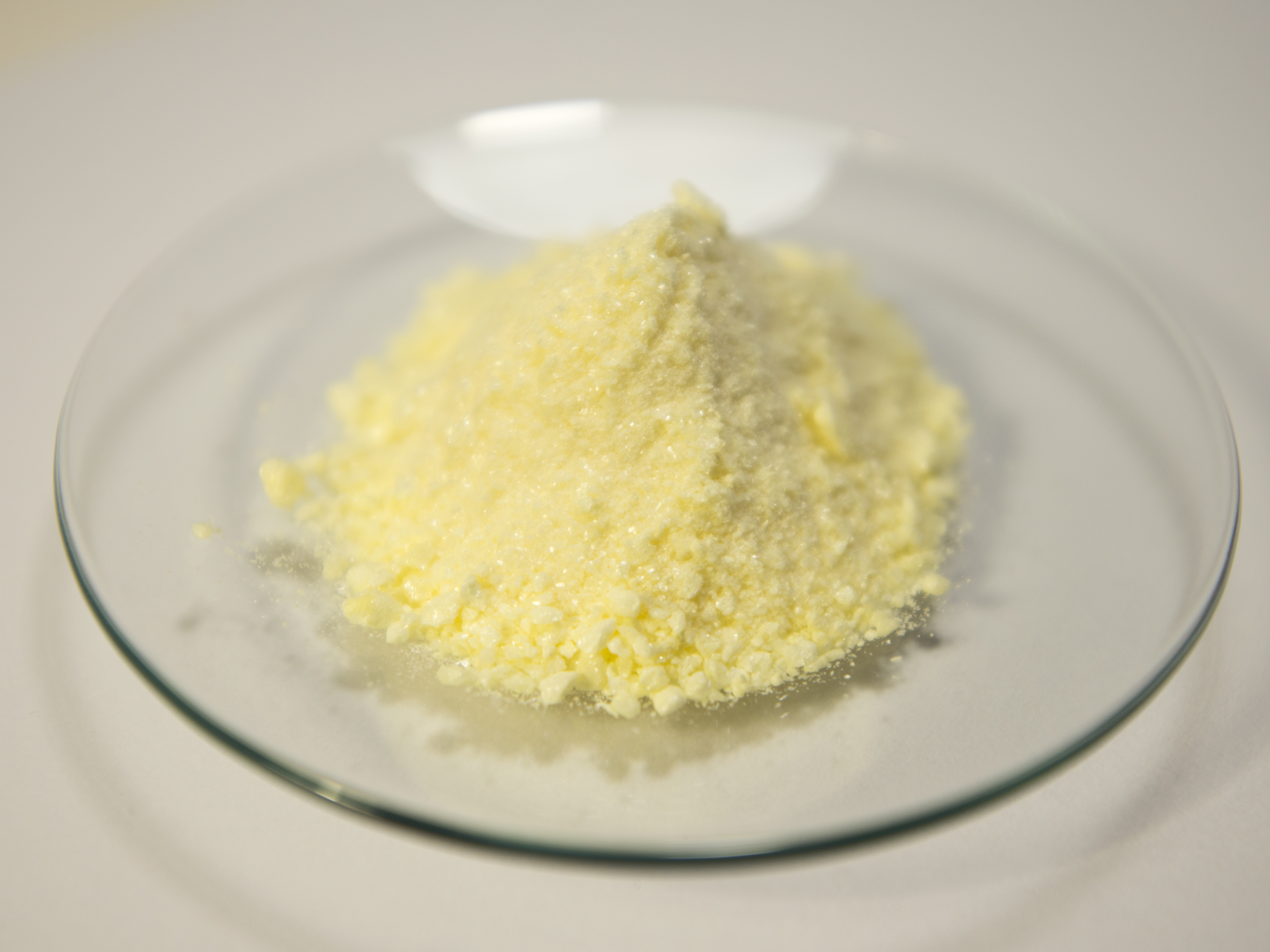
- Compound sample

Identifiers
CAS Number	51-28-5
3D model (JSmol)	Interactive image
ChEBI	CHEBI:42017
ChEMBL	ChEMBL273386
ChemSpider	1448
DrugBank	DB04528
ECHA InfoCard	100.000.080
KEGG	C02496
PubChem CID	1493
UNII	Q13SKS21MN
CompTox Dashboard (EPA)	DTXSID0020523
- InChI: InChI=1S/C6H4N2O5/c9-6-2-1-4(7(10)11)3-5(6)8(12)13/h1-3,9H Key: UFBJCMHMOXMLKC-UHFFFAOYSA-N
- SMILES: O=[N+]([O-])c1cc(ccc1O)[N+]([O-])=O

Properties
Chemical formula	HOC_{6}H_{3}(NO_{2})_{2}
Molar mass	184.107 g·mol^{−1}
Appearance	Yellow orthorhombic crystals (from water) or platelets (from alcohol)
Odor	Sweet, musty
Density	1.683 g/cm^{3} (24 °C (75 °F; 297 K)); 1.483 g/cm^{3} (72.5 °C (162.5 °F; 345.6 K))
Melting point	112–114 °C (234–237 °F; 385–387 K)
Boiling point	decomposes (sublimes when carefully heated)
Solubility in water	5.6 g/L (18 °C (64 °F; 291 K))
Solubility in Ethyl acetate	15.5 g/100g (15 °C (59 °F; 288 K)); 39.5 g/100g (50 °C (122 °F; 323 K))
Solubility in Acetone	35.9 g/100g (15 °C); 98.3 g/100g (50 °C)
Solubility in Ethanol	3.8 g/100g (15 °C); 13.3 g/100g (50 °C)
Solubility in Methanol	5.0 g/100g (15 °C); 16.9 g/100g (50 °C)
Solubility in Pyridine	21.0 g/100g (15 °C); 71.0 g/100g (50 °C)
Solubility in Toluene	6.4 g/100g (15 °C); 20.0 g/100g (50 °C)
log P	1.54
Vapor pressure	1.99 hPa (0.0289 psi) (18 °C (64 °F; 291 K))
Acidity (pK_{a})	4.09

Explosive data
Shock sensitivity	2kg, 17" (Picatinny Arsenal apparatus)
Detonation velocity	5,000 m/s (16,000 ft/s)
RE factor	81% TNT (Trauzl test)

Pharmacology
Drug class	Uncoupling agents
Routes of administration	Oral
- Pharmacokinetics
Metabolism	Nitro reduction
Biological half-life	Unknown
Legal status	AU: S10 (Dangerous substance); BR: Class F4 (Other prohibited substances); UK: Regulated poison; US: Investigational new drug, Orphan drug (Huntington's disease); Banned for human consumption in many countries.

Hazards
- GHS labelling
Pictograms	(GHS02: Flammable) (GHS06: Toxic) (GHS08: Health hazard) (GHS09: Environmental hazard)
Signal word	Danger
Hazard statements	H228, H300, H311+H331, H372, H400
Precautionary statements	P210, P240, P241, P260, P264, P270, P271, P273, P280, P301+P310+P330, P302+P352+P312, P304+P340+P311, P314, P362, P370+P378, P391, P403+P233, P405, P501
- Lethal dose or concentration (LD, LC)
LD_{50} (median dose)	71 mg/kg (rat, oral); 72 mg/kg (mouse, oral)
- Except where otherwise noted, data are given for materials in their standard state (at 25 °C [77 °F], 100 kPa). Infobox references

2,4-Dinitrophenol (2,4-DNP or simply DNP) is an organic compound with the formula HOC_{6}H_{3}(NO_{2})_{2}. It occurs as yellow crystals or platelets. It has been used in explosives manufacturing and as a pesticide and herbicide.

In humans, DNP causes dose-dependent mitochondrial uncoupling, causing the rapid loss of ATP as heat, and leading to uncontrolled hyperthermia—up to 44 °C (111 °F)—and death in case of overdose. Researchers noticed its effect on raising the basal metabolic rate in accidental exposure and developed it as one of the first weight loss drugs in the early twentieth century. DNP was banned from human use by the end of the 1930s due to its risk of death and toxic side effects. DNP continues to be used after its ban and experienced a resurgence in popularity after it became available on the Internet.

== Chemical properties ==
Synthesis of DNP (right) from phenol and nitric acid via 2-nitrophenol and 4-nitrophenol

It sublimes, is volatile with steam, and is soluble in most organic solvents as well as aqueous alkaline solutions.

DNP can be produced by hydrolysis of 2,4-dinitrochlorobenzene. Other routes of DNP synthesis include nitration of monochlorobenzene, nitration of benzene with nitrogen dioxide and mercurous nitrate, oxidation of 1,3-dinitrobenzene, and nitration of phenol with nitric acid. Nitration of phenol is not practical commercially because partial decomposition of the phenolic ring occurs.

A dust explosion is possible with DNP in powder or granular form in the presence of air. DNP may explosively decompose when submitted to shock, friction or concussion, and may explode upon heating. DNP forms explosive salts with strong bases as well as ammonia, and emits toxic fumes of nitrogen dioxide when heated to decomposition.

== Uses ==
=== Industrial ===
Historically, DNP has been used as an antiseptic and as a non-selective bioaccumulating pesticide.

DNP was particularly useful as a herbicide alongside other closely related dinitrophenol herbicides like 2,4-dinitro-o-cresol (DNOC), dinoseb and dinoterb. Since 1998 DNP has been withdrawn from agricultural use. Currently, there are no actively registered pesticides containing DNP in the United States or Europe. Dinoseb is used industrially as a polymerisation inhibitor during styrene production. In 2023, the Home Office said it could not determine any legitimate industrial uses for DNP in the United Kingdom.

It is a chemical intermediate in the production of sulfur dyes, wood preservatives and picric acid. A precursor to 2,4,6-trinitrotoluene (TNT), DNP has also been used to make photographic developers and explosives. DNP is classified as an explosive in the United Kingdom and the United States.

=== In humans ===
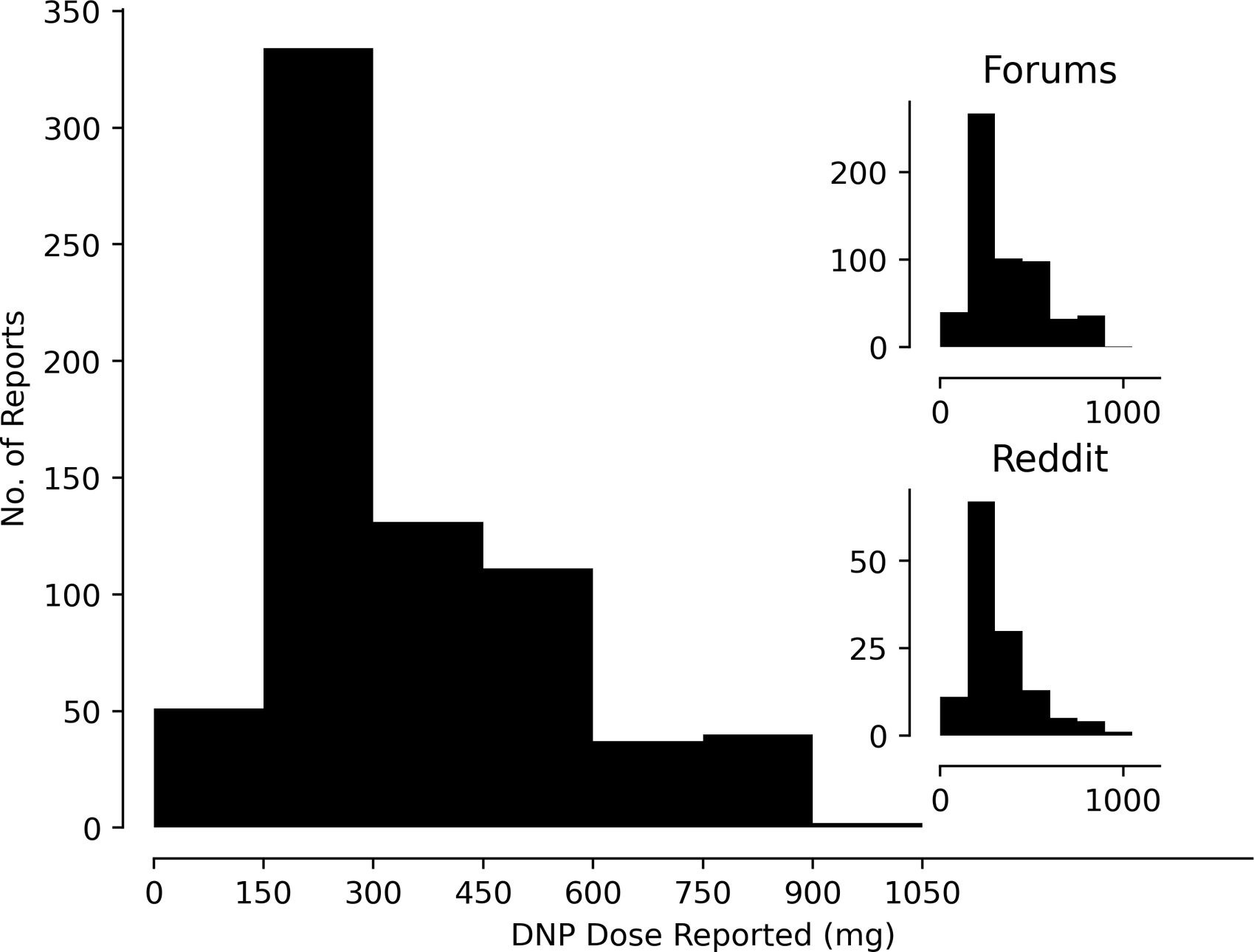
Histogram of DNP doses reported on online forums and the subreddit /r/DNP

DNP raises energy expenditure by 30 to 40 percent and causes a weight loss of 0.7–0.9 kilograms (1.5–2.0 lb) per week. Although DNP is no longer in clinical use as a weight loss drug due to its dangerous side effects, its mechanism of action remains under investigation as a potential approach for treating obesity and non-alcoholic fatty liver disease. Researchers developed a prodrug, HU6, which is metabolized to DNP in the liver to provide more stable blood concentrations. HU6 completed a phase II trial in which it produced significant reductions in liver fat and body weight in overweight people with elevated liver fat, without serious adverse effects.

DNP is used by bodybuilders, fitness enthusiasts, and people with an eating disorder to lose weight. The user profile is similar to that of anabolic steroids; many perceive it to be effective and with manageable risks. Despite health warnings from regulators, DNP is readily available online sometimes under other names such as Dinosan, Dnoc, Solfo Black, Nitrophen, Aldifen, and Chemox. DNP is often sold in tablets containing 100 to 200 mg and may be sold alongside other substances such as anabolic steroids and thyroxine. It may also be found as a contaminant in other bodybuilding supplements not advertised as containing DNP. Online message boards provide information on dosage and regimens for DNP use, and describe the risks of taking the compound and provide advice on how to mitigate hyperthermia. According to a study published in 2023, the most commonly reported doses were between 150 to 300 mg/d. Between 2010 and 2020, reports of overdoses were higher in Australasia, Europe and North America than in Asia, Africa, and South or Central America.

It is easily absorbed through intact skin, and vapors are absorbed through the respiratory tract.

== Biochemistry ==
=== Mechanism of action ===
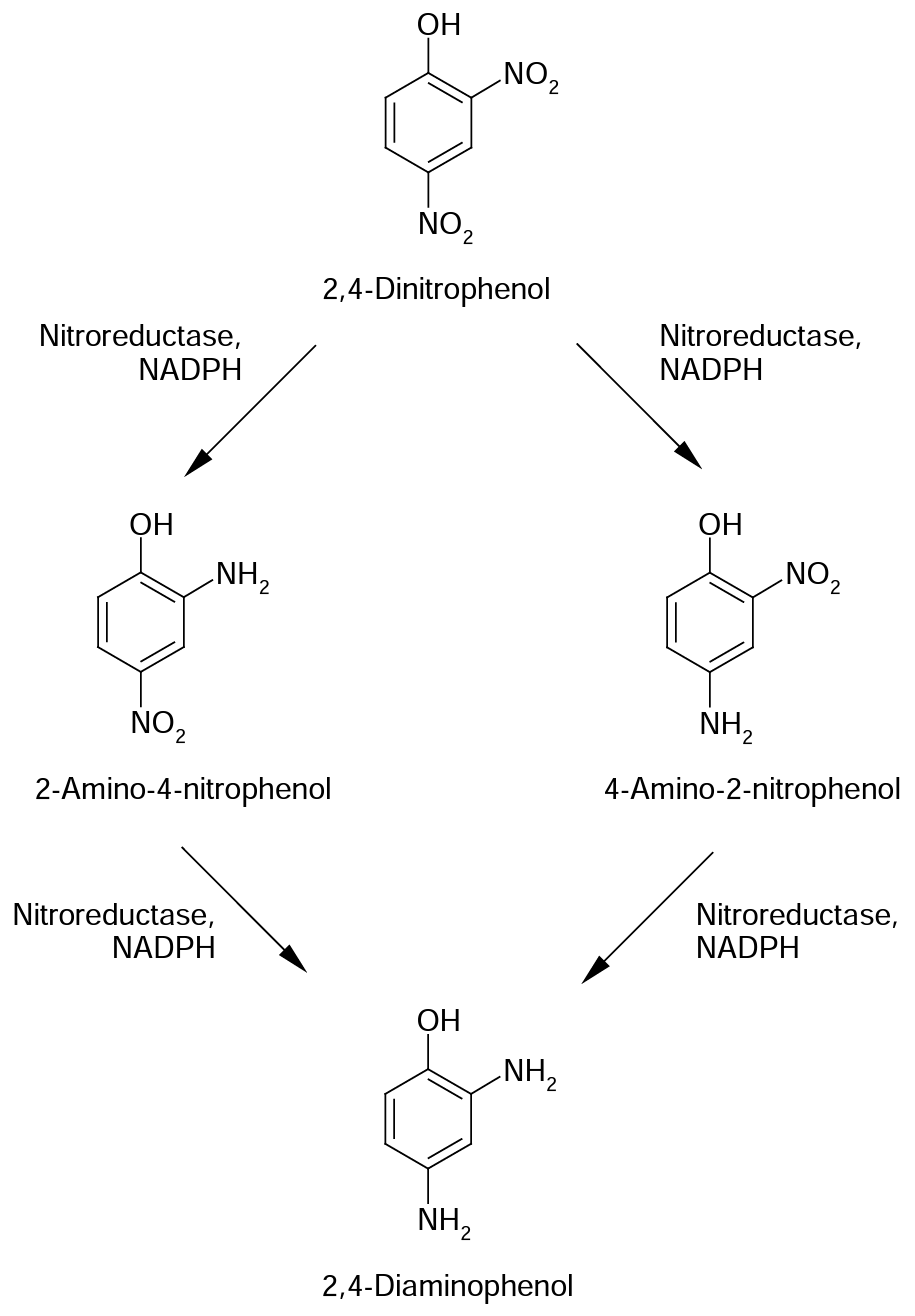
Nitro reduction of DNP

In living cells, DNP acts as a protonophore, an agent that can shuttle protons (hydrogen cations) across biological membranes. It dissipates the proton gradient across the mitochondrial membrane, collapsing the proton motive force that the cell uses to produce most of its ATP chemical energy. Instead of producing ATP, the energy of the proton gradient is lost as heat. The inefficiency is proportional to the dose of DNP that is taken. As the dose increases and energy production is made more inefficient, metabolic rate increases (and more fat is burned) in order to compensate for the inefficiency and to meet energy demands. DNP is probably the best known agent for uncoupling oxidative phosphorylation. The phosphorylation of adenosine diphosphate (ADP) by ATP synthase gets disconnected or uncoupled from oxidation.

DNP raises the basal metabolic rate (BMR) and lowers T4 (thyroid hormone) levels by increasing T4 metabolism and reducing thyroid hormone secretion. Because it binds to thyroxine-binding globulin, overall thyroid function may not be affected. DNP cannot substitute for thyroid hormone in myxedema.

=== Pharmacokinetics ===
Information about pharmacokinetics and pharmacodynamics of DNP in humans is limited. DNP is metabolized via nitro reduction. Its major metabolites are 2-amino-4-nitrophenol and 4-amino-2-nitrophenol. In overdoses, symptom onset can be as soon as 3 hours and the average time to death was 14 hours.

=== Adverse effects ===
DNP has a low therapeutic index, meaning that the dosage at which toxicity occurs is not much larger than that required to produce a desired effect. Individual tolerance to DNP's harmful short- and long-term effects varies greatly. The most common adverse effect reported is a rash, which could be maculopapular, urticarial, angioedema, or an exfoliative dermatitis. Cataracts can form, causing a permanent loss of vision in days to months of usage, and permanent deafness has also been reported. Other adverse effects reported include peripheral neuritis, agranulocytosis, and neutropaenia. Negative effects on the central nervous system, cardiovascular system, and bone marrow can occur. In animal studies, DNP acted as a teratogen, mutagen, and carcinogen and caused developmental and reproductive harm. An unusually yellow coloring of the skin, mucous membranes, sclera, urine, stomach contents, and internal organs is an indication of DNP exposure, but does not occur in every case. Contact with skin or inhalation can cause DNP poisoning. Symptoms are typically mild with dermal exposure, but inhalation can lead to systemic effects, the same way as oral exposure.

=== Overdose ===
Overdose is extremely dangerous; cases reported to poison control centers had a 11.9 percent fatality rate between 2010 and 2020. Although the largest number of overdose deaths occurred in the 1910s and 1920s when the chemical was in more widespread industrial use, the substance's use as a dieting aid has caused a number of fatalities in the 21st century: at least 50 overdose deaths were reported worldwide between 2010 and 2020. Although the lowest published fatal ingested dose is 4.3 mg/kg, a typical overdose death occurs at a higher level of exposure, around 20–50 mg/kg.

The first symptoms to appear are nausea, vomiting, abdominal pain, and perhaps diarrhea. The typical overdose syndrome seen with DNP and other phenols is a combination of hyperthermia, tachycardia, diaphoresis, and tachypnoea. Because of the heat produced during uncoupling, DNP overdose will overpower the body's attempt to maintain thermal homeostasis and cause an uncontrolled, fatal rise in body temperature up to as high as 44 °C (111 °F). The disruption of metabolism also leads to the accumulation of potassium and phosphate, potentially contributing to toxicity. DNP can cause T wave and ST segment abnormalities; heart muscle, kidney, and liver damage have been found on autopsy. According to an analysis of United Kingdom and United States overdose cases, tachycardia, hyperpyrexia, acidosis, and agitation or confusion are independent predictors of overdose death.

There is no antidote to DNP and management strategies are based on expert opinion and case studies. Treatment for overdose is supportive, and often involves aggressive cooling using methods such as ice baths and intravenous fluids. Grundlingh et al. recommend administering activated charcoal if the patient presents within an hour of ingestion and using intravenous vasopressors or inotropes to control blood pressure if necessary. Intravenous methylthioninium chloride can treat methaemoglobinaemia. Benzodiazepines can help control seizures and dantrolene has been used in an attempt to control hyperthemia. Cardiopulmonary resuscitation (CPR) has been used on people who died of DNP overdoses but has no known successful outcomes.

=== History ===
During World War I, munitions workers in France fell ill and some died from DNP exposure. Stanford University academic Maurice L. Tainter learned of DNP's effect in raising the metabolic rate and causing weight loss and pioneered its use as a weight loss drug. Although he was aware of DNP's narrow therapeutic index, Tainter tried the drugs on obese patients and published successful results in 1933; average weight loss was 20 pounds (9.1 kg) and most recipients did not report adverse effects. In 1934, Tainter estimated that at least 100,000 people had been treated with DNP in the United States during its first year on the market and there had been three reported fatalities connected to the drug. Tainter argued that DNP was highly effective in raising the metabolic rate (up to 50 percent) and avoided the negative circulatory effects of desiccated thyroid, another weight loss drug in use at the time.

DNP explainer in the FDA publication Chamber of Horrors

Other physicians were less optimistic about the adverse effects of DNP, and in 1935 the American Medical Association's Council on Chemistry and Pharmacy declined to list DNP in the New and Nonofficial Remedies on the grounds that its benefits did not exceed its risks to health. Reports of cataracts forming during DNP usage administered by a physician appeared the same year; in 1936 an ophthalmologist based in San Francisco estimated that 2,500 American women had gone blind from DNP use. Physician opinion turned against the drug, but many people bought direct-to-consumer preparations of DNP—marketed as a cosmetic rather than a drug to evade existing regulations.

DNP's risks were highlighted in the Chamber of Horrors, an exhibit assembled by the United States Food and Drug Administration (FDA) to explain the limitations of existing American drug regulations. In 1938, the Food, Drug, and Cosmetic Act increased the FDA's ability to regulate drugs. DNP was deemed so toxic as to be banned for human consumption and in 1940 the FDA reported that there was no evidence of continued sale for this purpose. Nevertheless, it continued to be used for weight loss. William F. Loomis and Fritz Albert Lipmann discovered DNP's mechanism of action and reported it in a 1948 publication.

Reports of its use increased in the twenty-first century after the drug became available on the Internet.

== As a pollutant ==
Although many militaries are replacing traditional 2,4,6-trinitrotoluene (TNT)-based explosives for insensitive munitions, DNP is a degradation byproduct of the IMX-101 insensitive munition used by the United States Army.

While the Meisenheimer charge transfer reaction is effective at detecting TNT, it is not effective at detecting many other explosives including DNP. Researchers are studying colorimetric detection and other methods for DNP to find if water or solids such as soils are contaminated with DNP. UiO-66-NH_{2} can be used to bind to and remove DNP from solution.

== Legal status ==
DNP is banned for human consumption in many countries. Because it has some legitimate uses, in many jurisdictions, DNP is legal to sell, but not for human consumption. DNP has been banned by the World Anti-Doping Association since 2015.

Petróczi et al. recommend against campaigns informing people of the risks of DNP because it could increase use of the drug. However, Sousa et al. argue that publicity campaigns in the United Kingdom in the early and mid-2010s reduced DNP usage. In 2015, Interpol and the World Anti-Doping Agency released an orange notice warning of the dangers of DNP.

In 1941, the Eastman Kodak Company, a bulk distributor of DNP, was investigated after some of its product was found in illegal diet pills. Nicholas Bachynsky, a Texas physician, provided the drug to patients under the name "Mitcal". He was convicted of violating drug laws in 1986, but continued to work with DNP and was additionally convicted of fraud in 2008. In 2018, a seller in the United Kingdom was convicted of manslaughter for selling DNP for human consumption. The conviction was sent to retrial in 2020 by the English Court of Appeal, where the seller was, once again, convicted of gross negligence manslaughter.

The UK government reclassified DNP as a regulated poison with effect from October 2023.
