= Maurice L. Tainter =

Maurice L. Tainter (1899 – March 8, 1991) was an American pharmacologist and professor at Stanford University. He helped pioneer the use of 2,4-dinitrophenol for weight loss, but the drug was later banned due to its safety profile. In 1943, he left Stanford for a job at Winthrop Company. In 1960, he began working for Sterling Drug.

Tainter was from Carroll, Iowa. He died in Tampa, Florida on March 8, 1991, at the age of 91.
