= Dinitro-ortho-cresol =

Names
- Preferred IUPAC name 2-Methyl-3,5-dinitrophenol
- Other names: 3,5-Dinitro-ortho-cresol; 3,5-Dinitro-o-cresol; DNOC; 2-Methyl-3,5-dinitrophenol; 3,5-Dinitro-2-hydroxytoluene; DNC

Identifiers
CAS Number	497-56-3
3D model (JSmol)	Interactive image
ChemSpider	61439
PubChem CID	68131
UNII	GZL54GG8S5
CompTox Dashboard (EPA)	DTXSID2075423
- InChI: InChI=1S/C7H6N2O5/c1-4-6(9(13)14)2-5(8(11)12)3-7(4)10/h2-3,10H,1H3
- SMILES: [O-][N+](=O)c1cc(O)c(c([N+]([O-])=O)c1)C

Properties
Chemical formula	C_{7}H_{6}N_{2}O_{5}
Molar mass	198.134 g·mol^{−1}
Appearance	Yellow solid
Odor	Odorless
Density	1.58 g/cm^{3}
Melting point	86.5 °C (187.7 °F; 359.6 K)
Boiling point	312 °C (594 °F; 585 K)
Solubility in water	0.01% (20°C)
Vapor pressure	0.00005 mmHg (20°C)

Hazards
Flash point	noncombustible
- Lethal dose or concentration (LD, LC)
LD_{50} (median dose)	7 mg/kg (oral, rat); 50 mg/kg (oral, cat); 21 mg/kg (oral, mouse); 24.6 mg/kg (oral, rabbit); 24.6 mg/kg (oral, guinea pig); 31 mg/kg (oral, rat)
- NIOSH (US health exposure limits)
PEL (Permissible)	TWA 0.2 mg/m^{3} [skin]
REL (Recommended)	TWA 0.2 mg/m^{3} [skin]
IDLH (Immediate danger)	5 mg/m^{3}
- Except where otherwise noted, data are given for materials in their standard state (at 25 °C [77 °F], 100 kPa). Infobox references

Dinitro-ortho-cresol (DNOC) is an organic compound with the structural formula CH_{3}C_{6}H_{2}(NO_{2})_{2}OH. It is a yellow solid that is only slightly soluble in water. It is extremely toxic to humans and was previously used as a herbicide and insecticide.

== Preparation ==
This compound is prepared by disulfonation of o-cresol. The resulting disulfonate is then treated with nitric acid to give DNOC. A variety of related derivatives are known including those where the methyl group is replaced by sec-butyl (dinoseb), tert-butyl (dinoterb), and 1-methylheptyl (dinocap). These are prepared by the direct nitration of the alkyphenols.

== Applications and safety ==
DNOC is an uncoupler, which means that it interferes with adenosine triphosphate (ATP) production, making it extremely toxic to humans.

DNOC was one of the earliest pesticides developed, being used as an insecticide since the 1890s and a herbicide since the 1930s. It was banned for use as a pesticide in the United States in 1991.

Symptoms of dinitro-ortho-cresol poisoning, due to ingestion or other forms of exposure, include confusion, fever, headache, shortness of breath, and sweating.
