= 3-Ethyl-3-pentanol =

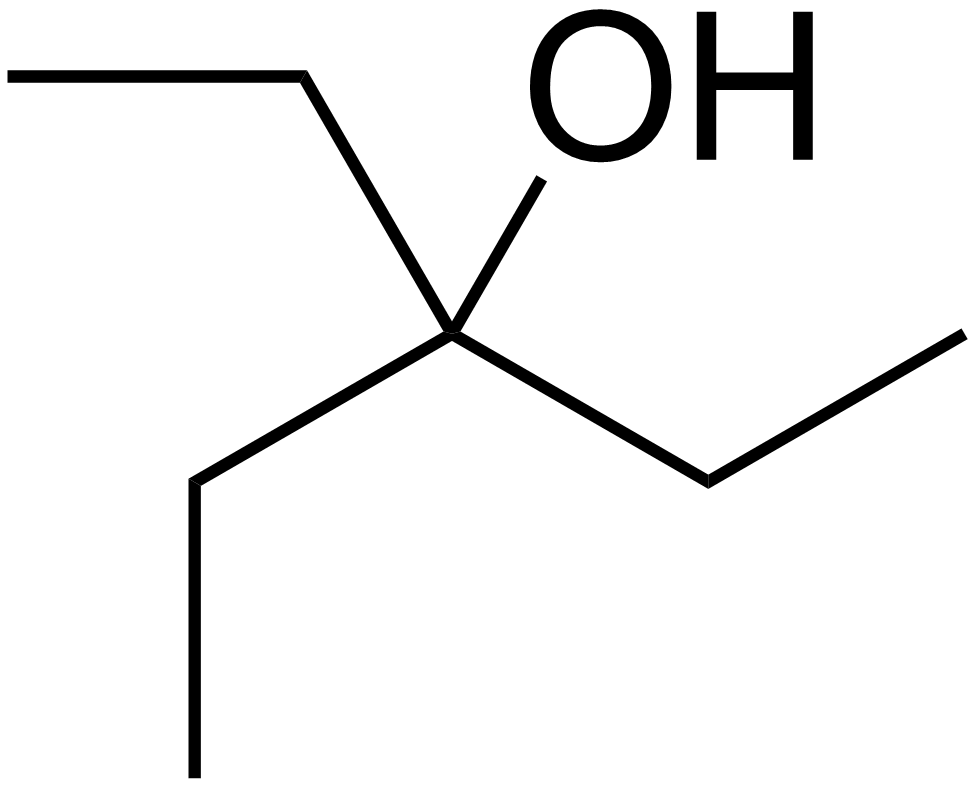

Names
- Preferred IUPAC name 3-Ethylpentan-3-ol
- Other names Triethylcarbinol; 1,1-Diethyl-1-propanol; 3-Ethyl-3-hydroxypentane; Triethylmethanol

Identifiers
CAS Number	597-49-9
3D model (JSmol)	Interactive image; Interactive image
Abbreviations	Et_{3}COH
ChemSpider	11210
ECHA InfoCard	100.009.003
PubChem CID	11702
UNII	8P2O4Y3RTC
CompTox Dashboard (EPA)	DTXSID9060497
- InChI: InChI=1S/C7H16O/c1-4-7(8,5-2)6-3/h8H,4-6H2,1-3H3 Key: XKIRHOWVQWCYBT-UHFFFAOYSA-N; InChI=1/C7H16O/c1-4-7(8,5-2)6-3/h8H,4-6H2,1-3H3 Key: XKIRHOWVQWCYBT-UHFFFAOYAB
- SMILES: CCC(O)(CC)CC; OC(CC)(CC)CC

Properties
Chemical formula	C_{7}H_{16}O
Molar mass	116.204 g·mol^{−1}
Appearance	Clear liquid
Density	0.82 g/cm^{3}
Boiling point	140–142 °C (284–288 °F; 413–415 K)
- Except where otherwise noted, data are given for materials in their standard state (at 25 °C [77 °F], 100 kPa). verify (what is ?) Infobox references

3-Ethyl-3-pentanol, also known as 3-ethylpentan-3-ol, is a tertiary alcohol with the molecular formula C_{7}H_{16}O.

It reacts with chromic acid by first dehydrating to an olefin 3-ethyl-2-pentene, and then by converting the double bond to an epoxide.

Perfluorination affords perfluorotriethylcarbinol, a powerful uncoupling agent.
