= 2,3-Dinitrophenol =

Names
- Preferred IUPAC name 2,3-Dinitrophenol

Identifiers
CAS Number	66-56-8
3D model (JSmol)	Interactive image; Interactive image
ChEBI	CHEBI:39354
ChemSpider	5956
ECHA InfoCard	100.000.571
EC Number	200-628-7
PubChem CID	6191
UNII	735M30625H
UN number	1599 1320
CompTox Dashboard (EPA)	DTXSID2075261
- InChI: InChI=1S/C6H4N2O5/c9-5-3-1-2-4(7(10)11)6(5)8(12)13/h1-3,9H Key: MHKBMNACOMRIAW-UHFFFAOYSA-N; InChI=1S/C6H4N2O5/c9-5-3-1-2-4(7(10)11)6(5)8(12)13/h1-3,9H Key: MHKBMNACOMRIAW-UHFFFAOYSA-N
- SMILES: C1=CC(=C(C(=C1)O)[N+](=O)[O-])[N+](=O)[O-]; c1cc(c(cc1[N+](=O)[O-])[N+](=O)[O-])O

Properties
Chemical formula	C_{6}H_{4}N_{2}O_{5}
Molar mass	184.107 g·mol^{−1}
Density	1.683 g/cm^{3}
Melting point	108 °C (226 °F; 381 K)
Boiling point	113 °C (235 °F; 386 K)

Hazards
- GHS labelling
Pictograms	(GHS06: Toxic) (GHS08: Health hazard) (GHS09: Environmental hazard)
Signal word	Danger
Hazard statements	H301, H311, H331, H373, H411
Precautionary statements	P260, P264, P270, P271, P273, P280, P301+P310, P302+P352, P304+P340, P311, P312, P314, P321, P322, P330, P361, P363, P391, P403+P233, P405, P501
NFPA 704 (fire diamond)	3 3 3
Legal status	BR: Class F4 (Other prohibited substances)
- Except where otherwise noted, data are given for materials in their standard state (at 25 °C [77 °F], 100 kPa). Infobox references

2,3-Dinitrophenol (2,3-DNP) is an organic compound with the formula HOC_{6}H_{3}(NO_{2})_{2}. 2,3-Dinitrophenol is not planar due to rotation of nitro groups, and is acidic.

== See also ==
- Dinitrophenol
