= 3-Heptanol =

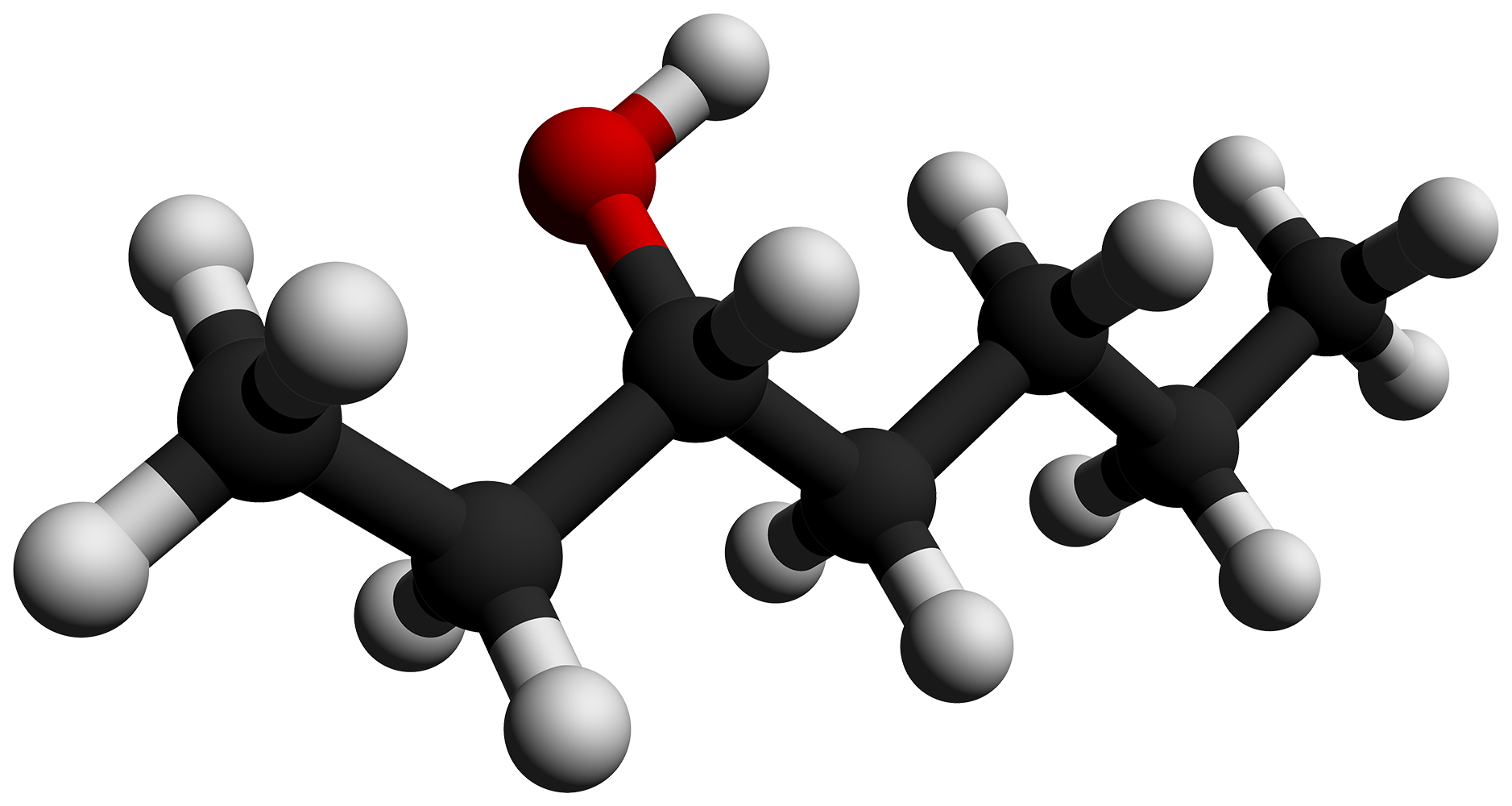

Names
- Preferred IUPAC name Heptan-3-ol

Identifiers
CAS Number	589-82-2
3D model (JSmol)	Interactive image
ChEBI	CHEBI:179170
ChEMBL	ChEMBL452729
ChemSpider	11036
ECHA InfoCard	100.008.784
PubChem CID	11520
UNII	12YBT48HMK
CompTox Dashboard (EPA)	DTXSID50862251
- InChI: InChI=1S/C7H16O/c1-3-5-6-7(8)4-2/h7-8H,3-6H2,1-2H3 Key: RZKSECIXORKHQS-UHFFFAOYSA-N
- SMILES: OC(CC)CCCC

Properties
Chemical formula	C_{7}H_{16}O
Molar mass	116.204 g·mol^{−1}
- Except where otherwise noted, data are given for materials in their standard state (at 25 °C [77 °F], 100 kPa). verify (what is ?) Infobox references

3-Heptanol or heptan-3-ol is an organic alcohol with the chemical formula C_{7}H_{16}O.

3-Heptanol is chiral, so (R)- and (S)- isomers exist.

== See also ==
- 1-Heptanol
- 2-Heptanol
- 4-Heptanol
