= Perfluorotriethylcarbinol =

Names
- Preferred IUPAC name 1,1,1,2,2,4,4,5,5,5-Decafluoro-3-(pentafluoroethyl)pentan-3-ol
- Other names Tris(pentafluoroethyl)methanol

Identifiers
CAS Number	6189-00-0
3D model (JSmol)	Interactive image
ChemSpider	72561
PubChem CID	80324
RTECS number	PC4200000
CompTox Dashboard (EPA)	DTXSID00210900
- InChI: InChI=1S/C7HF15O/c8-2(9,5(14,15)16)1(23,3(10,11)6(17,18)19)4(12,13)7(20,21)22/h23H Key: XPKCRLYGJRILBY-UHFFFAOYSA-N
- SMILES: C(C(C(F)(F)F)(F)F)(C(C(F)(F)F)(F)F)(C(C(F)(F)F)(F)F)O

Properties
Chemical formula	C_{7}HF_{15}O
Molar mass	386.060 g·mol^{−1}
Appearance	Liquid
Boiling point	105 °C (221 °F; 378 K)

Hazards
- Occupational safety and health (OHS/OSH)
Main hazards	Toxic
- Lethal dose or concentration (LD, LC)
LC_{Lo} (lowest published)	100 ppm (rat, 1 hour)
- Except where otherwise noted, data are given for materials in their standard state (at 25 °C [77 °F], 100 kPa). Infobox references

Perfluorotriethylcarbinol is a perfluorinated alcohol, namely 3-ethyl-3-pentanol. It is a powerful uncoupling agent and is toxic by inhalation.

== See also ==
- Perfluorinated compound
- Uncoupling agent
