= Nicholas Bachynsky (criminal) =

Russian-born American former doctor and fraudster

- Born: June 19, 1942 (age 84); Russia
- Occupation: Doctor
- Known for: DNP weight loss scheme
- Criminal charges: Drug law violations, fraud

Details
- Victims: 14,000 patients
- Country: United States
- State: Texas
- Killed: 1

Nicholas Bachynsky (born 1942 or 1943) is a Russian-born American former doctor and convicted fraudster. In the 1980s, he ran a weight loss clinic in Texas where he provided the unlicensed drug 2,4-Dinitrophenol (DNP) to patients under the name "Mitcal"; court filings reported that he had treated 14,000 people with the drug. Many reported adverse effects and at least one died. Bachynsky was convicted and fined for violating drug laws twice in 1986. Despite the convictions, he had earned over $8 million from his medical practice and continued to dispense DNP. In 2008, he was convicted of fraud for his role in a scheme to sell DNP. In 1988, he and some of his family and associates were charged with a variety of insurance fraud charges related to his DNP scheme. Bachynsky pled guilty to Part A of Count I, RICO, and Count 87, conspiracy to defraud the IRS in exchange for the prosecution dropping all other charges.
