= Carbonyl cyanide-p-trifluoromethoxyphenylhydrazone =

Names
- Preferred IUPAC name N-[4-(Trifluoromethoxy)phenyl]carbonohydrazonoyl dicyanide

Identifiers
CAS Number	370-86-5
3D model (JSmol)	Interactive image; Interactive image
ChEBI	CHEBI:75458
ChEMBL	ChEMBL457504
ChemSpider	3213
ECHA InfoCard	100.006.119
MeSH	FCCP
PubChem CID	3330
UNII	SQR3W2FLV5
CompTox Dashboard (EPA)	DTXSID40190494
- InChI: InChI=1S/C10H5F3N4O/c11-10(12,13)18-9-3-1-7(2-4-9)16-17-8(5-14)6-15/h1-4,16H Key: BMZRVOVNUMQTIN-UHFFFAOYSA-N; InChI=1/C10H5F3N4O/c11-10(12,13)18-9-3-1-7(2-4-9)16-17-8(5-14)6-15/h1-4,16H Key: BMZRVOVNUMQTIN-UHFFFAOYAT
- SMILES: C1=CC(=CC=C1NN=C(C#N)C#N)OC(F)(F)F; FC(F)(F)Oc1ccc(cc1)N/N=C(\C#N)C#N

Properties
Chemical formula	C_{10}H_{5}F_{3}N_{4}O
Molar mass	254.16811 g/mol
- Except where otherwise noted, data are given for materials in their standard state (at 25 °C [77 °F], 100 kPa). verify (what is ?) Infobox references

Carbonyl cyanide-p-trifluoromethoxyphenylhydrazone (FCCP) is an ionophore that is a mobile ion carrier. It is referred to as an uncoupling agent because it disrupts ATP synthesis by transporting hydrogen ions through the mitochondrial membrane before they can be used to provide the energy for oxidative phosphorylation. It is a nitrile and hydrazone. FCCP was first described in 1962 by Heytler.

== See also ==
- Carbonyl cyanide m-chlorophenyl hydrazone (CCCP)
