= Dinoseb =

Chemical compound used as a herbicide

Names
- Preferred IUPAC name 2-(Butan-2-yl)-4,6-dinitrophenol
- Other names 2-(sec-Butyl)-4,6-dinitrophenol

Identifiers
| CAS Number | 88-85-7 |
| 3D model (JSmol) | Interactive image |
| ChEBI | CHEBI:34719 |
| ChemSpider | 6684 |
| ECHA InfoCard | 100.001.692 |
| EC Number | 201-861-7 |
| KEGG | C14302 |
| PubChem CID | 6950 |
| UNII | YD44ZEM22M |
| UN number | 2779 2902 |
| CompTox Dashboard (EPA) | DTXSID3020207 |
- InChI: InChI=1S/C10H12N2O5/c1-3-6(2)8-4-7(11(14)15)5-9(10(8)13)12(16)17/h4-6,13H,3H2,1-2H3 Key: OWZPCEFYPSAJFR-UHFFFAOYSA-N; InChI=1/C10H12N2O5/c1-3-6(2)8-4-7(11(14)15)5-9(10(8)13)12(16)17/h4-6,13H,3H2,1-2H3 Key: OWZPCEFYPSAJFR-UHFFFAOYAU
- SMILES: [O-][N+](=O)c1cc(cc(c1O)C(CC)C)[N+]([O-])=O

Properties
| Chemical formula | C_{10}H_{12}N_{2}O_{5} |
| Molar mass | 240.215 g·mol^{−1} |
| Density | 1.35 g/cm^{3} |
| Melting point | 38–42 °C (100–108 °F; 311–315 K) |
| Acidity (pK_{a}) | 4.4 |

Hazards
- GHS labelling
| Pictograms | (GHS06: Toxic) (GHS08: Health hazard) (GHS09: Environmental hazard) (GHS05: Corrosive) |
| Signal word | Danger |
| Hazard statements | H300, H311, H315, H317, H318, H360, H410 |
| Precautionary statements | P201, P273, P280, P302+P352, P305+P351+P338, P310 |
- Lethal dose or concentration (LD, LC)
| LD_{50} (median dose) | 25–28 mg/kg (Oral, rat); 80 mg/kg (Dermal, rat); 20 mg/kg (Intravenous, rat); 7–9 mg/kg (Oral, bird) |
- Except where otherwise noted, data are given for materials in their standard state (at 25 °C [77 °F], 100 kPa). verify (what is ?) Infobox references

Dinoseb is a common industry name for 6-sec-butyl-2,4-dinitrophenol, a herbicide in the dinitrophenol family. It is a crystalline orange solid which does not readily dissolve in water. Dinoseb is banned as an herbicide in the European Union (EU) and the United States because of its toxicity.

It also finds use as a polymerisation inhibitor, where it is often referred to as DNBP. It is used to prevent the thermally induced polymerisation of styrene and other unsaturated monomers when they are being purified by distillation.

== Chemistry ==
=== Synthesis ===
The first step in the synthesis of dinoseb is the synthesis of 2-(1-methylpropyl)phenol from 1-butene and phenol. First, 1-butene is protonated so that a secondary carbocation is formed. This can only happen under acidic conditions. The formed carbocation can undergo electrophilic aromatic substitution with phenol. The product of this reaction is 2-(1-methylpropyl)phenol.

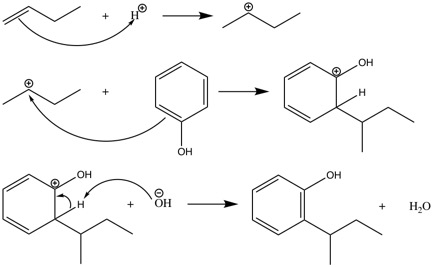

The second step in the synthesis of dinoseb is the nitration of 2-(1-methylpropyl)phenol. First, the nitronium ion is formed from nitric acid and sulfuric acid.

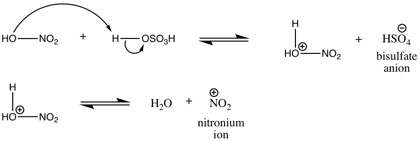

2-(1-methylpropyl)phenol takes up the nitronium ion to form the arenium ion, which has three resonance structures. Water can cleave off the additional proton to form a neutral compound.

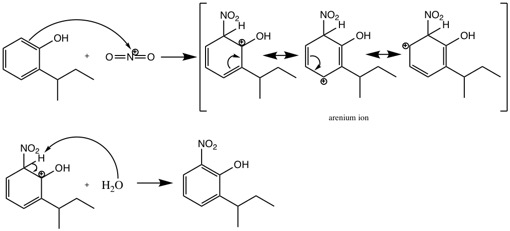

The product of this reaction can undergo a second nitration to form dinoseb.

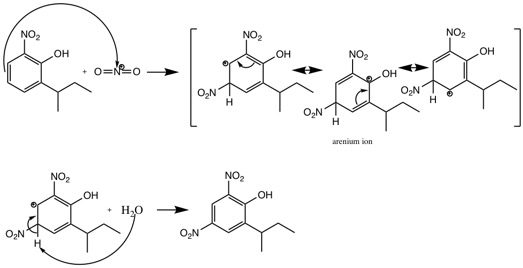

=== Stereoisomerism ===
Dinoseb is a racemic mixture of two enantiomers.

Dinoseb (2 stereoisomers)
| (S)-configuration | (R)-configuration |

== History ==
In 1892, dinitro-ortho-cresol (2,4-dinitro-6-methylphenol), a chemical compound closely related to dinoseb, was discovered in Germany and first used as an insecticide. It was later also used as an herbicide and also fungicide after those characteristics were discovered. In 1945 the ortho-methyl group was replaced by a sec-butyl group, producing dinoseb. This compound had a superior contact and stomach activity on insects and mites.

Dinoseb became commercially available in 1945 and was approved for use in the United States based on safety data from Industrial Bio-Test Laboratories. On January 13, 1984 the Danish ship Dana Optima lost 80 drums of Dinoseb during their trip from North Shields, England to Esbjerg, Denmark. After four months 72 drums were found and recovered.

Dinoseb was withdrawn from the market in 1986 due to an increased threat of birth defects after female field workers were exposed to the chemical. It could also cause sterility in men who were exposed to the chemical.

== Uses ==
Dinoseb is an herbicide that was once widely used with crops like soybeans, vegetables, fruits, nuts, and citrus. It has been banned in the EU and the United States due to its high toxicity. Dinoseb was also used as an insecticide to protect grapes.

On the internet, dinoseb and other dinitrophenols are sold as weight loss pills, though they are not useful for that purpose and are highly toxic.

== Mechanism of action ==
Dinoseb is an uncoupler of oxidative phosphorylation. It is a weak acid that can pass through lipid membranes when it's in the undissociated form.

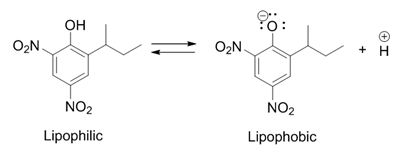

It uses this property to transport protons through the inner mitochondrial membrane (IMM). Protons are taken up from the intermembrane space and after transport through the IMM, they are released again in the mitochondrial matrix. Dinoseb in the dissociated form is negatively charged, which causes it to move to the intermembrane space because of the electrochemical gradient that exists across the IMM. The negative charge is delocalized over the ring, increasing the anion's membrane permeability.

By lowering the proton gradient, dinoseb removes the cell's ability to produce ATP, resulting in the death of the cell.

Dinoseb is also a weak inhibitor of mitochondrial Complex III and Complex II of the respiratory chain.

In plants, dinoseb also inhibits photosynthesis by inhibiting the electron flow from photocomplex II to plastoquinone. As a result, the plastoquinone can't create a proton gradient and no ATP is produced by the ATP synthase. Also, NADP can't be reduced to form NADPH, which removes the ability to create glucose from carbon dioxide. This also leads to cell death.

== Toxicity ==
Dinoseb is highly toxic via ingestion, inhalation or when absorbed through the skin. Symptoms include fatigue, sweating, headaches, nausea, stomach aches and fever. It is also an irritant for the eyes. It causes burns on contact with skin and leaves yellow stains. For pregnant women this substance is especially dangerous as it can cause growth defects in unborn children (it is teratogenic).

Dinoseb interferes with the oxidative phosphorylation by acting as an uncoupler which disrupts the production of ATP in the mitochondria. This is done by making the inner membrane of the mitochondria more permeable to protons, which results in a lower proton gradient. As the membrane potential / gradient is the driving force for the production of ATP, the cell is unable to produce energy.

Exposure to dinoseb also induces ER-mediated calcium release, resulting in increased intracellular calcium levels. This is followed by activation of caspase, which is a protease involved in cell apoptosis. The surviving cells have an increase of alpha-synuclein levels which leads to dopaminergic neurodegeneration.

Dinoseb can cross biological membranes like the blood-brain barrier and the placental barrier..

Oral LD_{50} values of dinoseb range from 14 to 114 mg/kg in rats, mice, rabbits, and guinea pigs. For humans, this is 5 to 50 mg/kg.

== First aid measures ==
Because of the high toxicity, emergency services and poison control should be called immediately if anyone is exposed to this material.

== See also ==
- Dinoterb
