= 1-Heptanol =

- Skeletal formula

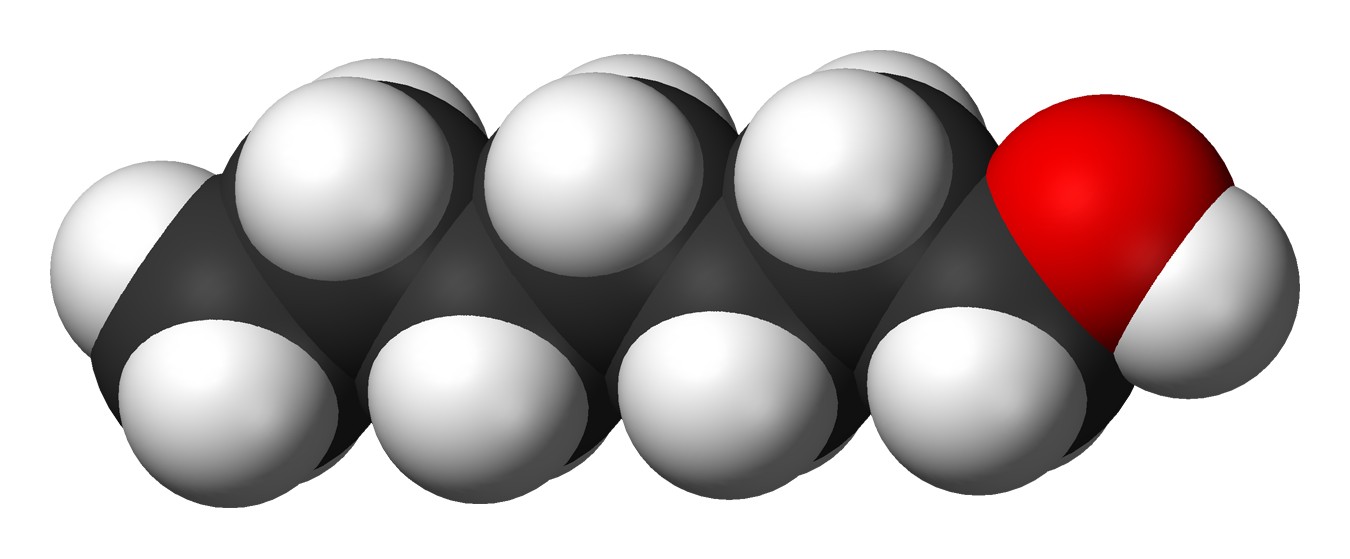
- Space-filling model

Names
- Preferred IUPAC name Heptan-1-ol
- Other names Heptyl alcohol n-Heptyl alcohol Enanthic alcohol

Identifiers
CAS Number	111-70-6
3D model (JSmol)	Interactive image
Abbreviations	HpOH n-HpOH nHpOH^{n}HpOH
ChEBI	CHEBI:43003
ChEMBL	ChEMBL273459
ChemSpider	7837
ECHA InfoCard	100.003.544
PubChem CID	8129
UNII	8JQ5607IO5
CompTox Dashboard (EPA)	DTXSID8021937
- InChI: InChI=1S/C7H16O/c1-2-3-4-5-6-7-8/h8H,2-7H2,1H3 Key: BBMCTIGTTCKYKF-UHFFFAOYSA-N; InChI=1/C7H16O/c1-2-3-4-5-6-7-8/h8H,2-7H2,1H3 Key: BBMCTIGTTCKYKF-UHFFFAOYAV
- SMILES: OCCCCCCC

Properties
Chemical formula	C_{7}H_{16}O
Molar mass	116.204 g·mol^{−1}
Density	0.8187 g/cm^{3}
Melting point	−34.6 °C (−30.3 °F; 238.6 K)
Boiling point	175.8 °C (348.4 °F; 448.9 K)
Magnetic susceptibility (χ)	−91.7·10^{−6} cm^{3}/mol
Refractive index (n_{D})	1.423

Thermochemistry
Std enthalpy of combustion (Δ_{c}H^{⦵}_{298})	−4637.9 kJ/mol

Hazards
- GHS labelling
Pictograms	(GHS07: Exclamation mark)
Signal word	Warning
Hazard statements	H319
Precautionary statements	P264+P265, P280, P305+P351+P338, P337+P317
NFPA 704 (fire diamond)	2 2 0
Flash point	76 °C (169 °F; 349 K)
- Except where otherwise noted, data are given for materials in their standard state (at 25 °C [77 °F], 100 kPa). verify (what is ?) Infobox references

1-Heptanol is an alcohol with a seven carbon chain and the structural formula of CH_{3}(CH_{2})_{6}OH. It is a clear colorless liquid that is very slightly soluble in water, but miscible with ether and ethanol.

== Overview ==
There are three other isomers of heptanol that have a straight chain, 2-heptanol, 3-heptanol, and 4-heptanol, which differ by the location of the alcohol functional group.

Heptanol is commonly used in cardiac electrophysiology experiments to block gap junctions and increase axial resistance between myocytes. Increasing axial resistance will decrease conduction velocity and increase the heart's susceptibility to reentrant excitation and sustained arrhythmias.

1-Heptanol has a pleasant smell and is used in cosmetics for its fragrance.

== See also ==
- 2-Heptanol
- 3-Heptanol
