= 4-Heptanol =

Names
- Preferred IUPAC name Heptan-4-ol
- Other names: Dipropyl carbinol; Di(n-propyl) carbinol; 4-heptyl alcohol

Identifiers
CAS Number	589-55-9
3D model (JSmol)	Interactive image
ChEBI	CHEBI:165516
ChemSpider	11029
ECHA InfoCard	100.008.775
EC Number	209-651-7
PubChem CID	11513
UNII	YG7B8091BP
CompTox Dashboard (EPA)	DTXSID1060429
- InChI: InChI=1S/C7H16O/c1-3-5-7(8)6-4-2/h7-8H,3-6H2,1-2H3 Key: YVBCULSIZWMTFY-UHFFFAOYSA-N
- SMILES: CCCC(CCC)O

Properties
Chemical formula	C_{7}H_{15}OH
Molar mass	116.204 g·mol^{−1}
Appearance	Clear colourless to pale yellow liquid
Density	0.8139 g/cm^{3}
Melting point	−41.2 °C (−42.2 °F; 232.0 K)
Boiling point	156 °C (313 °F; 429 K)
Solubility in water	4.753 g/L (20 °C)
Solubility	Miscible in alcohols and ethers
log P	2.22
Acidity (pK_{a})	15.3

Hazards
- GHS labelling
Pictograms	(GHS02: Flammable)
Signal word	Danger
Hazard statements	H225, H302
Precautionary statements	P210, P233, P240, P241, P242, P243, P264, P270, P280, P330, P370+P378, P501
NFPA 704 (fire diamond)	2 2 0
Safety data sheet (SDS)	Agilent
- Except where otherwise noted, data are given for materials in their standard state (at 25 °C [77 °F], 100 kPa). Infobox references

4-Heptanol is a chemical compound and one of the four regioisomers of heptanol. It is a symmetric secondary alcohol that has poor solubility in water but is miscible with ether and alcohol solvents.
