= Uncoupler =

Type of biological molecule

An uncoupler or uncoupling agent is a molecule that disrupts oxidative phosphorylation in prokaryotes and mitochondria or photophosphorylation in chloroplasts and cyanobacteria by dissociating the reactions of ATP synthesis from the electron transport chain. The result is that the cell or mitochondrion expends energy to generate a proton-motive force, but the proton-motive force is dissipated before the ATP synthase can recapture this energy and use it to make ATP. Because the intracellular supply of protons is replenished, uncouplers actually stimulate cellular metabolism and oxygen consumption (despite their inhibitory effects on oxidative phosphorylation) and increase the energy cost of generating ATP. Uncouplers are capable of transporting protons through mitochondrial and lipid membranes.

== Description ==
Classical uncouplers have five properties:

1. the complete release of respiratory control
2. the substitution of all coupled processes (ATP synthesis, transhydrogenation, reverse electron flow, active transport of cations, etc.) by a cyclic proton transport mediated by the uncoupler
3. the elimination of all protonic and cationic gradients generated across the mitochondrial or prokaryotic membrane
4. no discrimination in these actions between one coupling site and another
5. no discrimination between coupled processes driven by electron transfer and coupled processes driven by ATP hydrolysis

Pseudo-uncouplers show one or more of these properties, but not all, and thus must be combined with one or more other pseudo-uncouplers to achieve full uncoupling.

== Classical uncouplers ==
The following compounds are known to be classical uncouplers:

- 2,4-dinitrophenol (DNP)
- 2,5-dinitrophenol
- 1799 (α,α′-bis(hexafluoracetonyl)acetone)
- BAM15, N^{5},N^{6}-bis(2-fluorophenyl)-[1,2,5]oxadiazolo[3,4-b]pyrazine-5,6-diamine
- 2-tert-butyl-4,6-dinitrophenol (Dinoterb)
- 6-sec-butyl-2,4-dinitrophenol (Dinoseb)
- C_{4}R1 (a short-chain alkyl derivative of rhodamine 19)
- Carbonyl cyanide phenylhydrazone (CCP)
- Carbonyl cyanide m-chlorophenyl hydrazone (CCCP)
- Carbonyl cyanide-p-trifluoromethoxyphenyl hydrazone (FCCP)
- CDE (4β-cinnamoyloxy,1β,3α-dihydroxyeudesm-7,8-ene) (produced by Verbesina)
- Chlorfenapyr (after N-dealkylation by P450, an insecticide in IRAC group 13)
- CZ5
- Desaspidin
- Dicoumarol
- Dinitro-ortho-cresol (DNOC)
- Ellipticine
- Endosidin 9 (ES9)
- Flufenamic acid
- Niclosamide ethanolamine (NEN)
- Ppc-1 (a secondary metabolite produced by Polysphondylium pseudocandidum)
- Pentachlorophenol (PCP) (Note: Not to be confused with the recreation drug, phencyclidine.)
- Perfluorotriethylcarbinol
- S-13 (5-chloro-3-t-butyl-2′-chloro-4′-nitrosalicylanilide)
- TTFB (4,5,6,7-tetrachloro-2-trifluoromethylbenzimidazole)
- Malonoben (tyrphostin A9, SF-6847, AG17)
- (+)-usnic acid
- XCT-790
- mitoFluo (10-[2-(3-hydroxy-6-oxo-xanthen-9-yl)benzoyl]oxydecyl-triphenyl-phosphonium bromide)
- Triclosan (Trichloro-2'-hydroxydiphenyl ether)
- Pyrrolomycin C (produced by Genus Streptomyces)
- Salicylic acid (if taken in extreme excess)

== Pseudo-uncouplers ==
The following compounds are known to be pseudo-uncouplers:

- Azide
- Biguanides
- Bupivacaine
- Calcimycin (A23187)
- Dodecyltriphenylphosphonium (C_{12}TPP)
- Lasalocid (X537A)
- Long-chain fatty acids, such as linoleic acid
- MitoQ10
- Nigericin
- Picric acid (2,4,6-trinitrophenol)
- Sodium tetraphenylborate
- SR4 (1,3-bis(dichlorophenyl)urea 13)
- Tetraphenylphosphonium chloride
- Valinomycin
- Arsenate

== See also ==
- Uncoupling protein
- Mitochondrial toxicity
