= Dinoterb =

Names
- IUPAC name 2-tert-Butyl-4,6-dinitrophenol

Identifiers
CAS Number	1420-07-1
3D model (JSmol)	Interactive image
ChemSpider	14274
ECHA InfoCard	100.014.376
PubChem CID	14994
UNII	2O5H456CFI
CompTox Dashboard (EPA)	DTXSID7041883
- InChI: InChI=1S/C10H12N2O5/c1-10(2,3)7-4-6(11(14)15)5-8(9(7)13)12(16)17/h4-5,13H,1-3H3 Key: IIPZYDQGBIWLBU-UHFFFAOYSA-N
- SMILES: [O-][N+](=O)c1cc(cc(c1O)C(C)(C)C)[N+]([O-])=O

Properties
Chemical formula	C_{10}H_{12}N_{2}O_{5}
Molar mass	240.215 g·mol^{−1}
Density	1.35 g/cm^{3}
Melting point	125.5–126.5 °C (257.9–259.7 °F; 398.6–399.6 K)
Solubility in water	0.45 mg/L (20 °C)

Hazards
- Lethal dose or concentration (LD, LC)
LD_{50} (median dose)	26 mg/kg (rat, oral)
- Except where otherwise noted, data are given for materials in their standard state (at 25 °C [77 °F], 100 kPa). Infobox references

Dinoterb is a chemical compound previously used as a contact herbicide. It is an uncoupler, affecting respiration in mitochondria and photosynthesis in chloroplasts. It is banned for use in the European Union and use was suspended in the United States in 1986.

== Links ==
- Dinoterb in the Pesticide Properties DataBase (PPDB)
