= Interventional oncology =

Specialty field of interventional radiology

Interventional oncology (abbreviated IO) is a subspecialty field of interventional radiology that deals with the diagnosis and treatment of cancer and cancer-related problems using targeted minimally invasive procedures performed under image guidance. Interventional oncology has developed to a separate pillar of modern oncology and it employs X-ray, ultrasound, computed tomography (CT) or magnetic resonance imaging (MRI) to help guide miniaturized instruments (e.g. biopsy needles, ablation electrodes, intravascular catheters) to allow targeted and precise treatment of solid tumours (also known as neoplasms) located in various organs of the human body, including but not limited to the liver, kidneys, lungs, and bones. Interventional oncology treatments are routinely carried out by interventional radiologists in appropriate settings and facilities.

== Procedures performed ==
Interventional oncology procedures are generally divided between diagnostic procedures that help obtain tissue diagnosis of suspicious neoplasms and therapeutic ones that aim to cure or palliate the tumour. Therapeutic interventional oncology procedures may be classified further into ablation techniques that destroy neoplastic tissues by delivery of some form of heat, cryo or electromagnetic energy and embolization techniques that aim to occlude the blood vessels feeding the tumour and thereby destroy it by means of ischemia. Both ablation and embolization techniques are minimally invasive treatment, i.e. they may be delivered through the skin (in a percutaneous way) without the need for any skin incisions or other form of open surgery. Hence, most treatments are nowadays offered as day case or outpatient appointments and patients may enjoy rapid recovery and minimal pain and discomfort with low rates of complications.

=== Diagnostic techniques ===
- Fine-needle aspiration: biopsy with a fine needle trying to obtain tissue diagnosis by examining the tumour cells.
- Core needle biopsy: similar to fine-needle aspiration, only involving the use of larger needles to excise the tissue.
- Vacuum-assisted biopsy: similar to core needle aspiration but using vacuum assistance to gather the sample. Vacuum assisted breast biopsy may provide a high diagnostic yield in case of breast tumours.

=== Image-guided tumor ablation ===
Uses different types of energy to burn (radiofrequency ablation (RFA) and microwave ablation (MWA)), deliver electrical fields/electroporate (irreversible electroporation(IRE)) or freeze (cryoablation) solid tumors resulting in tumor cell death. Ablation techniques can be performed throughout the body such as in the lung, liver, kidney, prostate, breast, bone, and other organs using image guidance to place a needle/probe through the skin into the target tissue.

- Chemical ablation: one of the earliest ablative techniques involving the injection of substances such as ethanol or acetic acid into a tumour to cause protein denaturation and cell death.
- Radiofrequency ablation: tissue destruction through delivery of electricity that produces ionic friction.
  - Radiofrequency ablation video demonstration: https://www.youtube.com/watch?v=8Xu0mxkLSzE
- Irreversible electroporation: delivery of electrical fields to disrupt cellular membranes and cause cell death or apoptosis or enhance targeted drug delivery.
  - Irreversible electroporation video demonstration: https://www.youtube.com/watch?v=NL-IIq-c3Ic
- Cryoablation: instant cell death by tissue freezing to temperatures as low as -20 Celsius.
  - Cryoablation video demonstration: https://www.youtube.com/watch?v=goLRh3UX0vM
- Microwave ablation: electromagnetic energy produces high frequency oscillation of water molecules leading to tissue coagulation by heat.
  - Microwave ablation video demonstration: https://www.youtube.com/watch?v=uPcU7HFumIk
- High-intensity focused ultrasound (HIFU): targeted beam of focused ultrasonic waves that accumulates high energy and burns the tissue.
- Laser ablation (Interstitial laser therapy): tissue coagulation by a laser beam.

=== High-intensity focused ultrasound (HIFU) ===
Uses a machine that emits high frequency sound waves to kill cancer cells and provide relief for tumor-related pain, such as in the bone.

=== Embolisation therapies ===
- Transarterial embolization (TAE)/bland embolization: Injection of embolic material (microparticles, alcohol, glue) through a catheter into the arteries feeding a tumor in order to completely occlude the tumor's blood supply and cause cell death. The most common indication is for treatment of unresectable liver cancer (hepatocellular carcinoma).
- Trans(catheter) arterial chemoembolization (TACE): Injection of a chemotherapy agent often with microparticles through a catheter into arteries feeding a tumor that both delivers chemotherapy and blocks the blood supply to the tumor to cause cell death
  - Can be performed in different ways:
    - Conventional transarterial chemoembolization (cTACE): Injection of lipiodol with high dose chemotherapy with or without microparticles directly into the tumor-feeding arteries.
    - Drug-eluting bead chemoembolization (DEB-TACE): delivery of microparticles that are themselves loaded with the chemotherapy agent – typically doxorubicin or irinotecan.
- Selective internal radiation therapy (also known as SIRT or Y-90 radioembolization or TARE): Injection of small beads loaded with a radioactive isotope, Yittrium-90 (Y-90), into blood vessels feeding a tumor in order to deliver a lethal dose of radiation causing cell death. Can be performed in a segmental (radiation segmentectomy) or a lobar (Radiation Lobectomy) fashion. Radiation lobectomy is commonly performed with the goal of inducing growth of the non-diseased lobe in order to have adequate liver function necessary to undergo surgical resection.
  - Y-90 video demonstration: https://www.youtube.com/watch?v=YndyQkSZl5I
- Intra-arterial chemotherapy: high dose chemotherapy is administered directly into the tumor-feeding arteries.
- Portal vein embolization (PVE): delivery of embolic material into the portal vein feeding the lobe of liver containing the tumor(s) of interest to induce growth of the non-diseased lobe in order to have adequate liver function necessary to undergo surgical resection of lobe containing the tumor(s).

=== Palliative treatments ===
Interventional oncology has long been used to provide palliative care for patients. IO procedures can help reduce cancer-related pain and improve patients’ quality of life. Tumours can intrude into various ducts and blood vessels of the body, obstructing the vital passage of food, blood or waste. The interventional radiological treatment known as stenting can be used to re-open blockages, for example of the esophagus or bile ducts in cases of esophageal cancer or cholangiocarcinoma, respectively, considerably relieving the patient's adverse symptoms.

== Diseases treated ==
Interventional oncology (IO) procedures are commonly applied to treat primary or metastatic cancer. IO treatments may be also offered in combination with any of the above oncological therapies in order to augment the therapeutic outcome in more complex or widespread (metastatic) cancer cases. There is a variety of applications of interventional oncological treatments for tumors that arise in the:

- Liver: primary liver tumors such as hepatocellular carcinoma or cholangiocarcinoma and liver metastases are often treated by procedures such as transarterial chemoembolization (TACE), Selective internal radiation therapy (SIRT/Y-90 radioembolization), portal vein embolization, transarterial/bland embolization, or image guided ablation (RFA, MWA, IRE, Cryoablation).
- Lung: lung metastases or inoperable primary lung cancer can be treated by interventional radiology procedures such as image guided ablation (cryoablation, microwave ablation and radiofrequency ablation).
  - Cryoablation of lung cancer video demonstration: https://www.youtube.com/watch?v=RH4po_14mDY
- Kidney: kidney tumors such as renal cell carcinoma can be treated with image guided ablation (RFA, MWA, cryotherapy) with similar results to partial nephrectomy. Benign kidney tumors such as angiomyolipomas can be treated with transarterial embolization to shrink the tumor size and reduce the risk of rupture/bleeding. Other embolizations are also performed for symptom relief or prior to surgery to reduce bleeding.
- Bone (or as metastases): bone metastases located in the spine, pelvis and long bones can be treated with image guided ablative techniques (RFA, MWA, cryoablation, electroportation) with or without injection of cement (cementoplasty) to stabilize the bone. These treatments may be palliatively for bone metastases pain or for some cases such as osteoid osteoma can curatively treat tumors. Embolizations are also performed for prior to surgery to reduce bleeding.
- Breast: for small, solitary breast cancer image guided ablative techniques are used to treat tumors, however their efficacy versus surgical resection has not yet been studied.
- Prostate: inoperable tumors can be treated with image guided ablative techniques and more recently irreversible electroporation.
  - Irreversible electroporation video demonstration: https://www.mskcc.org/videos/irreversible-electroporation-nanoknife-treat-prostate-tumors
- Pancreas: inoperable, or borderline resectable, locally advanced pancreatic adenocarcinoma can be treated with irreversible electroporation

== Milestones ==
- 1930 – First therapeutic embolization procedure (of a carotid-cavernous fistula); described by Brooks.
- 1960s – Radioisotopes such as Yttrium-90 (Y90) started to be investigated for the use in cancer treatments.
- 1966 – Embolization therapy to treat tumors and spinal cord vascular malformations by blocking the blood flow.
- 1969 – The catheter-delivered stenting technique and prototype stent.
- 1970s – Embolisation agents started to be used in palliative care to treat liver tumors.
- 1980 – Cryoablation to freeze liver tumors.
- 1983 – Laser interstitial thermal therapy first performed on a tumour by Bown.
- 1985 – Self-expanding stents are developed for vascular and oncological applications.
- 1990 – Radiofrequency ablation (RFA) technique for liver tumors.
- 1990s – Treatment of bone and kidney tumors by embolization.
- 1990s – RFA for soft tissue tumors, i.e., bone, breast, kidney, lung and liver cancer.
- 1997 – Intra-arterial delivery of tumor-killing viruses and gene therapy vectors to the liver.
- 1997 – HIFU first used to treat prostate cancer.
- 2012 – Pioneering liver chemoperfusion study reported by Delcath for disseminated liver metastases.

== Benefits ==
While the surgical resection of tumours is generally accepted to offer the best long-term solution, it is often not possible due to the size, number or location of the tumour. IR therapies may be applied to shrink the tumour, making a surgical or interventional treatment possible. Some patient groups may also be too weak to undergo open surgery. IR treatments can be applied in these complex cases to provide effective and milder forms of treatment. Interventional oncological techniques can also be used in combination with other treatments to help increase their efficacy. For example, IO techniques can be used to shrink large tumours making them easier to excise. Chemotherapeutic drugs can also be administered intra-arterially, increasing their potency and removing the harsh effects of system-wide application.

Patients can greatly benefit from IO treatments. The minimally invasive nature of the treatments means they cause less pain, fewer side effects and shorter recovery times. Many IO procedures can be performed on an outpatient basis, freeing up hospital beds and reducing costs.

== Further considerations ==
=== Multidisciplinary approach ===
Cancer is a multifaceted disease group that requires a multidisciplinary approach to treatment. Numerous studies have shown that cancer patients treated in multidisciplinary environments benefit greatly from the combined expertise. Interventional Radiologists are seen as playing a major role in multidisciplinary cancer teams where they provide innovative solutions to improve combined therapies and to treat complications.

=== Patient selection ===
Proper patient selection is the key element for the success of any medical procedure and improper conduct can have fatal consequences. Patient selection protocols must be strictly followed before treating patients with IO procedures.

=== Radiation protection ===
IO treatments are carried out under image guidance. For this reason practitioners must have attained solid training in radiation protection.

== See also ==
- Interventional radiology
