= Damian E. Dupuy =

Professor of Diagnostic Imaging

- Education: University of Massachusetts Amherst; University of Massachusetts Chan Medical School

Damian E. Dupuy is an American physician and medical researcher, currently serving as adjunct professor of diagnostic imaging at Brown University's Warren Alpert Medical School and director of ablation services at Cape Cod Hospital. He is also a member of Cape Cod preferred physicians.

== Education ==
Damian E. Dupuy holds a B.Sc. in Zoology graduating Magna Cum Laude/Phi Beta Kappa with a degree in zoology and a minor in Chemistry from the University of Massachusetts Amherst and a Doctor of Medicine from the University of Massachusetts Chan Medical School. He was an Intern at Boston University School of Medicine/Brockton Hospital. He completed his radiology residency as a chief resident in Radiology at Beth Israel Deaconess Medical Center/Harvard Medical School.

== Research and career ==
Damian E. Dupuy's clinical interests include the current and future clinical use and optimization of image guided cancer treatment with thermal and non thermal techniques. He researched the evaluation of Microwave Ablation Zone Variance Using Changes in Tissue Thermal and electrical Properties and also on a personalized microwave ablation treatment planning methodology based on radiomics and simulation. He concentrated his study on local ablative procedures. Dupuy contributed to the expansion of clinical applications for the successful treatment of cancers of the kidney, liver, lung, head and neck, adrenal gland, and skeleton. Dupuy pioneered other cutting-edge treatments, including percutaneous microwave ablation, cryoablation, and combination therapies combining radiofrequency ablation with external radiation or brachytherapy. As the primary investigator of two of the first ever National Cancer Institute-funded multi-center trials studying the safety and effectiveness of radiofrequency ablation for the treatment of medically inoperable stage 1 non small cell cancer of the lung (ACOSOG/Alliance Z4033 trial) and radiofrequency ablation for the pain palliation of osseous metastatic disease (ACRIN 6661 trial).

Damian E. Dupuy is presently a director of the tumor ablation at Cape Cod Hospital. Before obtaining his current role, he was the instructor in radiology at the Harvard Medical School from 1993 to 1997. At present, he is working as the Director of Tumor Ablation at Cape Cod Hospital. Based on his research at Brown University and Rhode Island Hospital perfecting an injectable gel-like biological nano technology device he founded a biotech company called Theromics Incorporated dedicated to the FDA approval and commercialization of a patented HeatSYNC gel technology that improves the thermal ablation zone during RFA or microwave treatments. The company has recently received a Phase 1 STTR grant from the National Science Foundation (NSF) to fund preclinical testing for FDA approval.

== Awards and honors ==
Damian E. Dupuy was an elected chief resident of the New England Deaconess Hospital at Harvard Medical School. He was listed as one of 'America's Best Doctors' continuously from 2007 to 2020. He is a fellow of the American College of Radiology, and in 2010 he received the Publications Merit Award from the American College of Radiology Imaging Network (ACRIN). In 2013, Dupuy was chosen to give the annual oration in diagnostic radiology at the Radiological Society of North America (RSNA) in Chicago. In 2013, at the annual CHEST Society meeting in Chicago, Dupuy received the Alfred Soffer Award for outstanding scientific abstract, for his research on the treatment of early stage lung cancer in medically inoperable patients with radiofrequency ablation (RFA).

== Publications ==
- Image-Guided Cancer Therapy. A Multidisciplinary Approach Springer Verlag 2013.
- Thermal ablation of tumours: biological mechanisms and advances in therapy.
- CT Densitometry and Morphology of Radiofrequency-Ablated Stage IA Non-Small Cell Lung Cancer: Results from the American College of Surgeons Oncology Group Z4033 (Alliance) Trial.
- Percutaneous image-guided cryoablation of painful metastases involving bone: multicenter trial.
- Evaluation of a Novel Thermal Accelerant for Augmentation of Microwave Energy during Image-guided Tumor Ablation.
- Lung Ablation with Irreversible Electroporation Promotes Immune Cell Infiltration by Sparing Extracellular Matrix Proteins and Vasculature: Implications for Immunotherapy.
- The in vivo performance of a novel thermal accelerant agent used for augmentation of microwave energy delivery within biologic tissues during image-guided thermal ablation: a porcine study.
