= Fibro-adipose vascular anomaly =

- Other names: FAVA
- Specialty: Pediatrics, interventional radiology,
- Symptoms: Pain, difficulty moving the affected limb, contracture, mild enlargement of the affected limb
- Usual onset: Later childhood to young adulthood
- Causes: Unknown, potentially genetic
- Diagnostic method: Ultrasound, MRI
- Treatment: Physical therapy, surgical resection, cryoablation
- Medication: Sirolimus
- Frequency: rare

Fibro-adipose vascular anomaly, also known as FAVA, is a type of vascular anomaly that is both rare and painful. FAVA is characterized by tough fibrofatty tissue taking over portions of muscle, most often contained within a single limb. FAVA also causes venous and/or lymphatic abnormalities.

Though FAVA has only been recognized as a distinct vascular anomaly, separate from common venous malformations, within the past ten years, FAVA has come to be considered a distinct congenital disorder. In 2025, the International Society for the Study of Vascular Anomalies (ISSVA) formally classified FAVA as an isolated, venous, slow-flow vascular malformation.

== Signs and symptoms ==
Common symptoms of FAVA include severe pain and difficulty moving the affected limb, mild enlargement of the affected limb with visible veins, and contracture.

In the cohort described by Alomari et al. from the Vascular Anomalies Center at Boston Children's Hospital, FAVA was located, in descending order, in the calf, forearm/wrist and thigh. The most common presentation is severe pain. Calf lesions, particularly those located in the posterior compartment, are commonly associated with restricted ankle dorsiflexion (equinus contracture).

== Genetics ==
No one knows what causes FAVA, though recent research revealed mutations in a gene called PIK3CA in some—but not all—cases. PIK3CA is a gene in the receptor tyrosine kinase phosphatidylinositol 3-kinase (PI3)-AKT growth-signaling pathway. The PIK3CA gene is located on the long (q) arm of chromosome 3.

There has been no evidence to suggest that FAVA is inherited or passed along in families.

== Diagnosis ==
FAVA is most often diagnosed in older children, teens and young adults, though it has been diagnosed earlier and later in a patient's life.

The constellation of clinical, radiologic, and histopathologic findings typically allow the diagnosis of FAVA. The most helpful imaging studies are ultrasonography (US) and magnetic resonance imaging (MRI). The major imaging features of FAVA include the presence of complex intramuscular solid lesion replacing normal muscle fibers with fibrofatty overgrowth and phlebectasia. The extrafascial part is composed of fatty overgrowth, phlebectasia, and occasional lymphatic malformation. The histopathologic findings in FAVA include dense fibrous tissue, fat, and lymphoplasmacytic aggregates within atrophied skeletal muscle. Adipose tissue within skeletal muscles are associated with large, irregular, and sometimes excessively muscularized venous channels and smaller, clustered channels. Organizing thrombi, lymphatic foci and enlarged nerves encircled by dense fibrous tissue are also frequently noted in FAVA.

== Management ==
Some FAVA patients develop limb contracture; in these cases early orthopedic consultation is necessary. Achilles tendon lengthening (heel-cord release) and physical therapy can be helpful for treating equinus contracture.

Unlike classical venous malformations, pain in FAVA is multifactorial and clinical response to sclerotherapy of the venous component can be less effective. While intralesional steroid injections and nerve block may offer temporary or partial pain relief, the source of pain is often the solid intramuscular lesion. Surgical resection and image-guided percutaneous cryoablation may offer an effective control of pain in FAVA lesions. Sirolimus has been effective in improving the quality of life in some people with FAVA.
