= Pelvic congestion syndrome =

Enlarged veins in the lower abdomen

Pelvic venous disease
- Other names: Pelvic congestion syndrome, Pelvic venous insufficiency, Pelvic varicocele syndrome
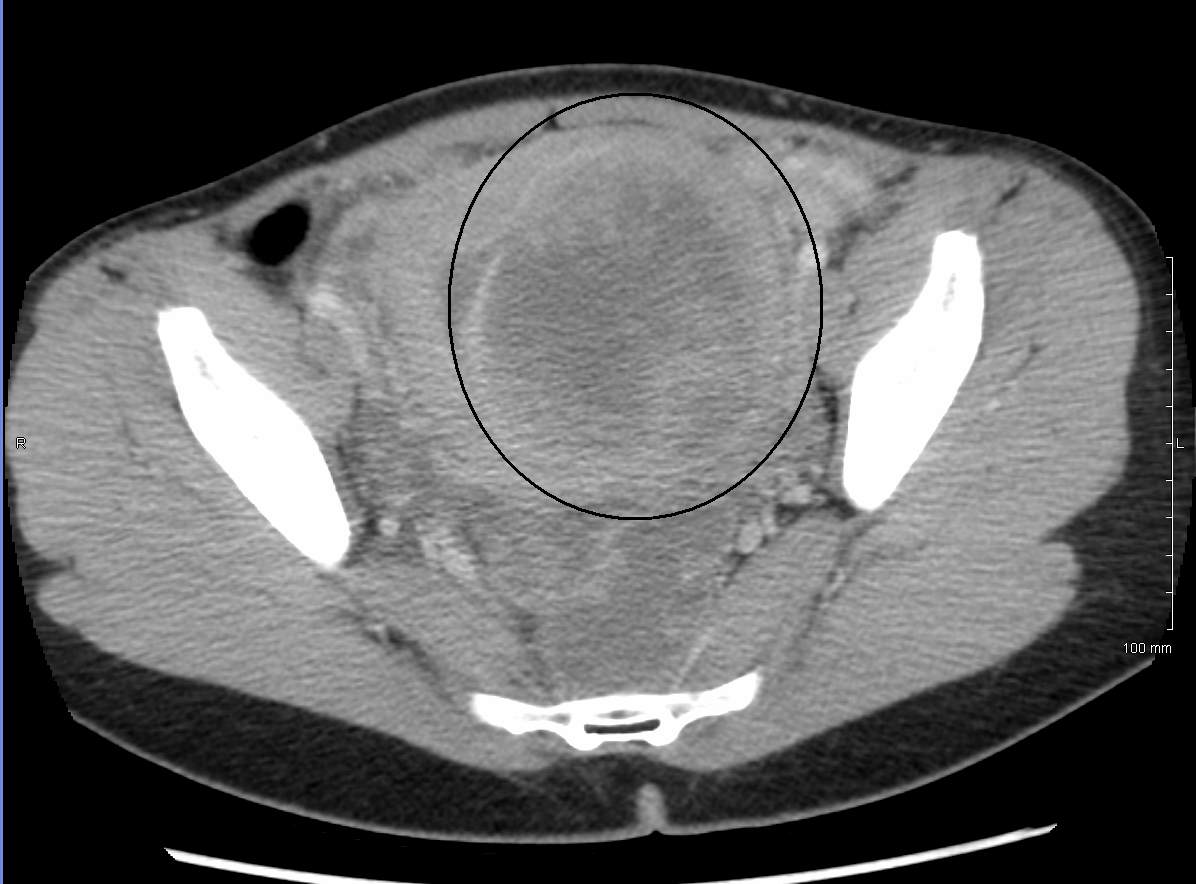
- A very large (9 cm) fibroid of the uterus which is causing pelvic congestion syndrome as seen on X-ray computed tomography
- Specialty: Interventional Radiology, gynecology
- Symptoms: Chronic pelvic pain, lower back pain, leg pain, dyspareunia, dysmenorrhea
- Complications: Chronic pain, varicose veins in lower extremities, mood disturbances
- Usual onset: Typically premenopausal women, often after multiple pregnancies
- Duration: Chronic
- Types: Primary (due to vein insufficiency) and Secondary (due to external compression)
- Causes: Hormonal influences, vein valve dysfunction, increased pelvic blood flow from pregnancy
- Risk factors: Multiple pregnancies, hormonal imbalances, family history, varicose veins
- Diagnostic method: Ultrasound, CT scan, MRI, Pelvic venography, Laparoscopy
- Differential diagnosis: Endometriosis, Irritable Bowel Syndrome, Interstitial Cystitis
- Prevention: None specific, but early diagnosis and management are beneficial
- Treatment: Hormonal therapy, Ovarian vein embolization, Sclerotherapy, pain management, compression garments
- Medication: Medroxyprogesterone, Nonsteroidal anti-inflammatory drugs (NSAIDs), Gonadotropin-releasing hormone agonists
- Prognosis: Often favorable with treatment; ~70-80% symptom relief post-embolization
- Frequency: 30% of women presenting complaints of chronic pelvic pain
- Deaths: Rare

Pelvic congestion syndrome, also known as pelvic vein incompetence, is a long-term condition believed to be due to enlarged veins in the lower abdomen. The condition may cause chronic pain, such as a constant dull ache, which can be worsened by standing or sex. Pain in the legs or lower back may also occur.

While the condition is believed to be due to blood flowing back into pelvic veins as a result of faulty valves in the veins, this hypothesis is not certain. The condition may occur or worsen during pregnancy. The presence of estrogen is believed to be involved in the mechanism. Diagnosis may be supported by ultrasound, CT scan, MRI, or laparoscopy.

Early treatment options include medroxyprogesterone or nonsteroidal anti-inflammatory drugs (NSAIDs). Surgery to block the varicose veins may also be done. About 30% of women of reproductive age reporting pelvic pain are affected. It is believed to be the cause of about a third of chronic pelvic pain cases. While pelvic venous insufficiency was identified in the 1850s it was only linked with pelvic pain in the 1940s.

== Signs and symptoms ==
Women with this condition experience a constant pain that may be dull and aching, but is occasionally more acute. The pain is worse at the end of the day and after long periods of standing, and those affected get relief when they lie down. The pain is worse during or after sexual intercourse, and can be worse just before the onset of the menstrual period.

Women with pelvic congestion syndrome have a larger uterus and a thicker endometrium. 56% of women manifest cystic changes to the ovaries, and many report other symptoms, such as dysmenorrhea, back pain, vaginal discharge, abdominal bloating, mood swings or depression, and fatigue.

== Causes ==
1. Local pelvic hormonal milieu
2. Venous outflow obstruction, such as May-Thurner syndrome, Nutcracker syndrome, Budd-Chiari syndrome, or left renal vein thrombosis
3. External compression due to tumor (including fibroids, endometriosis), or scarring

== Diagnosis ==
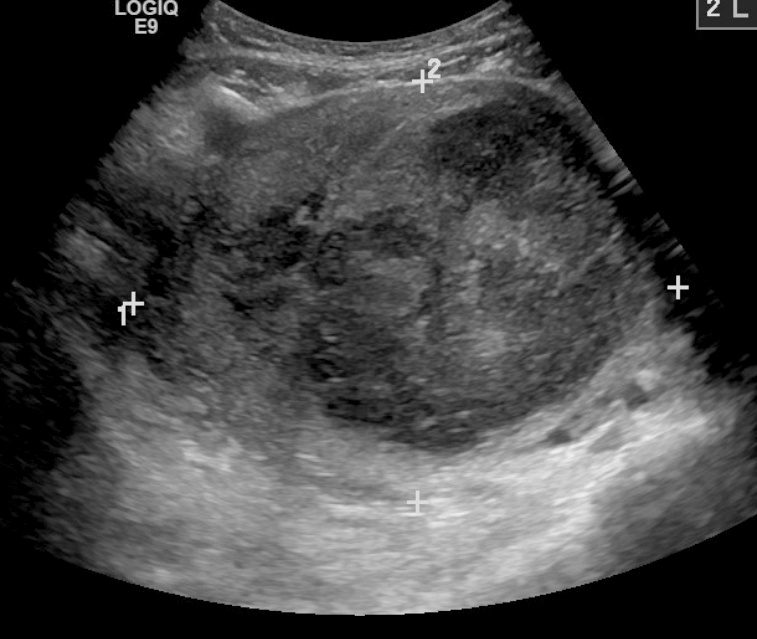
A very large (9 cm) fibroid of the uterus which is causing pelvic congestion syndrome as seen on ultrasound

Diagnosis can be made using ultrasound or laparoscopy testing. The condition can also be diagnosed with a venogram, CT scan, or an MRI. Ultrasound is the diagnostic tool most commonly used. Some research has suggested that transvaginal duplex ultrasound is the best test for pelvic venous reflux.

== Treatment ==
Early treatment options include pain medication using nonsteroidal anti-inflammatory drugs, and suppression of ovarian function.

More advanced treatment includes a minimally invasive procedure performed by an Interventional Radiologist. This minimally invasive procedure involves stopping blood within the pelvic varicose veins using a minimally invasive procedure called a catheter directed embolization. The procedure rarely requires an overnight stay in hospital and is usually performed as an outpatient procedure, and is done using local anesthesia. Patients report an 80% success rate, as measured by the amount of pain reduction experienced.

== See also ==
- Ovarian vein syndrome
- Nutcracker syndrome
- May-Thurner syndrome
- Budd-Chiari syndrome
