= Radiation lobectomy =

- Other names: RL
- Specialty: Interventional radiology

Radiation lobectomy is a form of radiation therapy used in interventional radiology to treat liver cancer. It is performed in patients that would be surgical candidates for resection, but cannot undergo surgery due to insufficient remaining liver tissue. It consists of injecting small radioactive beads loaded with yttrium-90 into the hepatic artery feeding the hepatic lobe in which the tumor is located. This is done with the intent of inducing growth in the contralateral hepatic lobe, not dissimilarly from portal vein embolization (PVE).

== Medical uses ==
RL is performed in people with liver cancer, both primary such as hepatocellular carcinoma and metastatic such as from colon adenocarcinoma. Surgical resection is considered the only curative treatment for liver cancer (other than liver transplantation for hepatocellular carcinoma) but it can only be performed in patients with sufficient remnant liver after resection (amongst other criteria). Both PVE and RL are performed in patients who are not surgical candidates due to insufficient future liver remnant (FLR), which is advised to be between 20-30% and 30-40% of the native liver volume in healthy and cirrhotic livers, respectively.

=== Results ===
Radiation lobectomy is a relatively new application of radioembolization and results are mainly reported in the form of retrospective chart review studies and case reports, without any prospective validation. Most authors report a comparable future liver remnant hypertrophy between portal vein embolization and RL, ranging between 10 and 47% with cases reaching up to 119% with RL. The main difference between the two is the time interval necessary for appropriate hypertrophy, greater for RL. PVE requires a shorter time frame to achieve comparable results, ranging between 2–6 weeks, while the hypertrophy kinetics of RL are slower but more constant, without significant plateau (some studies report continued hypertrophy up to 9 months). Some authors have even raised concerns regarding PVE and the potential interval disease progression in the embolized and treatment naive lobes while allowing hypertrophy, which is of less concern with RL due to its added tumoricidal effect. Additionally, RL has been demonstrated to aid surgical resection in some cases by inducing a “vascular shift” of tumor masses via necrosis and contraction away from major vascular pedicles, converting patients to resectable status. One study has shown preliminary 600-day survival in 12 out of 13 patients who received RL and subsequent resection. Ultimately, further studies are needed to prospectively compare survival and recurrence outcomes in patients receiving RL versus PVE.

== Side effects ==
Common side effects include fatigue, abdominal pain, nausea and anorexia, usually self-limiting. Post-radioembolization syndrome occurs in 20-70% of patients that undergo traditional radioembolization, presenting with shakes, chills, fatigue, nausea/vomiting, abdominal pain/discomfort, and/or cachexia and possibly hemodynamic changes, rarely requiring admission. Unfortunately, most data, if not all, is derived from traditional radioembolization outcomes studies and more will be needed to assess the actual incidence and risk of post-radioembolization syndrome in RL.

Complications are abscess formation, biliary complications (biloma, radiation induced cholecystitis and cholangitis, biliary necrosis), gastrointestinal complications (diarrhea, radiation induced gastritis and gastrointestinal ulceration), radiation induced pancreatitis, dermatitis, pneumonitis and lymphopenia.

== Procedure ==
RL is performed by an interventional radiologist in the angiography suite, in a fashion similar to radioembolization. The procedure is composed of two different portions, a planning phase and the actual radiation lobectomy, usually performed in two different sessions:

1. Planning phase: the patient undergoes planning angiography of the abdominal aorta and its major vessels. The interventional radiologist accesses the femoral artery via Seldinger technique and advances a wire and catheter to the level of the superior mesenteric artery and the celiac axis, injecting contrast in order to delineate the patient's anatomy. Utilizing smaller catheters and wires, he does the same thing evaluating the common hepatic artery, gastroduodenal, proper hepatic, left hepatic, right hepatic and phrenic arteries. The purpose of this planning angiogram is to evaluate for anatomical variants and collaterals that need to be coil embolized, in order to minimize the risk of non-target radioembolization. At this point, once the vascular anatomy has been delineated and necessary vessels have been embolized, the physician will inject 4-5 mCi of tc-99m macroaggregated albumin (MAA) in order to evaluate hepatopulmonary shunting, which serves as a proxy in assessing the risk of developing radiation pneumonitis. The dose of yttrium-90 to be infused is calculated with the manufacturer's formula based on lung shunting, body surface area, liver and tumor volume.
2. Radiation lobectomy: after gaining femoral artery access and advancing a catheter in the right hepatic artery (most often), ^{90}Y microspheres are infused in a lobar fashion, optimizing tumor and parenchymal coverage. Once the procedure has been completed, the patient is usually sent to the nuclear medicine department where a Bremsstrahlung scan will demonstrate the distribution of the radioactive material and assess for non-target embolization. Often, patients are started on proton pump inhibitors (with the addition of ursodeoxycholic acid - based on each center's protocol) for gastro-hepatic protection with or without a low-dose corticosteroid for prevention of post radioembolization syndrome and a fluoroquinolone antibiotic when the gallbladder is present (both per center protocol).

=== Follow-up ===
Patients undergo cross-sectional imaging at approximately 30–60 days from the procedure for evaluation of the degree of hypertrophy undergone by the contralateral side (as assessed by future liver remnant) and to assess tumor burden. At this time, the surgeons and/or a multi-specialty tumor board will convene to determine if the patient can/should undergo safe surgical resection.
