= Interventional radiology =

Medical subspecialty

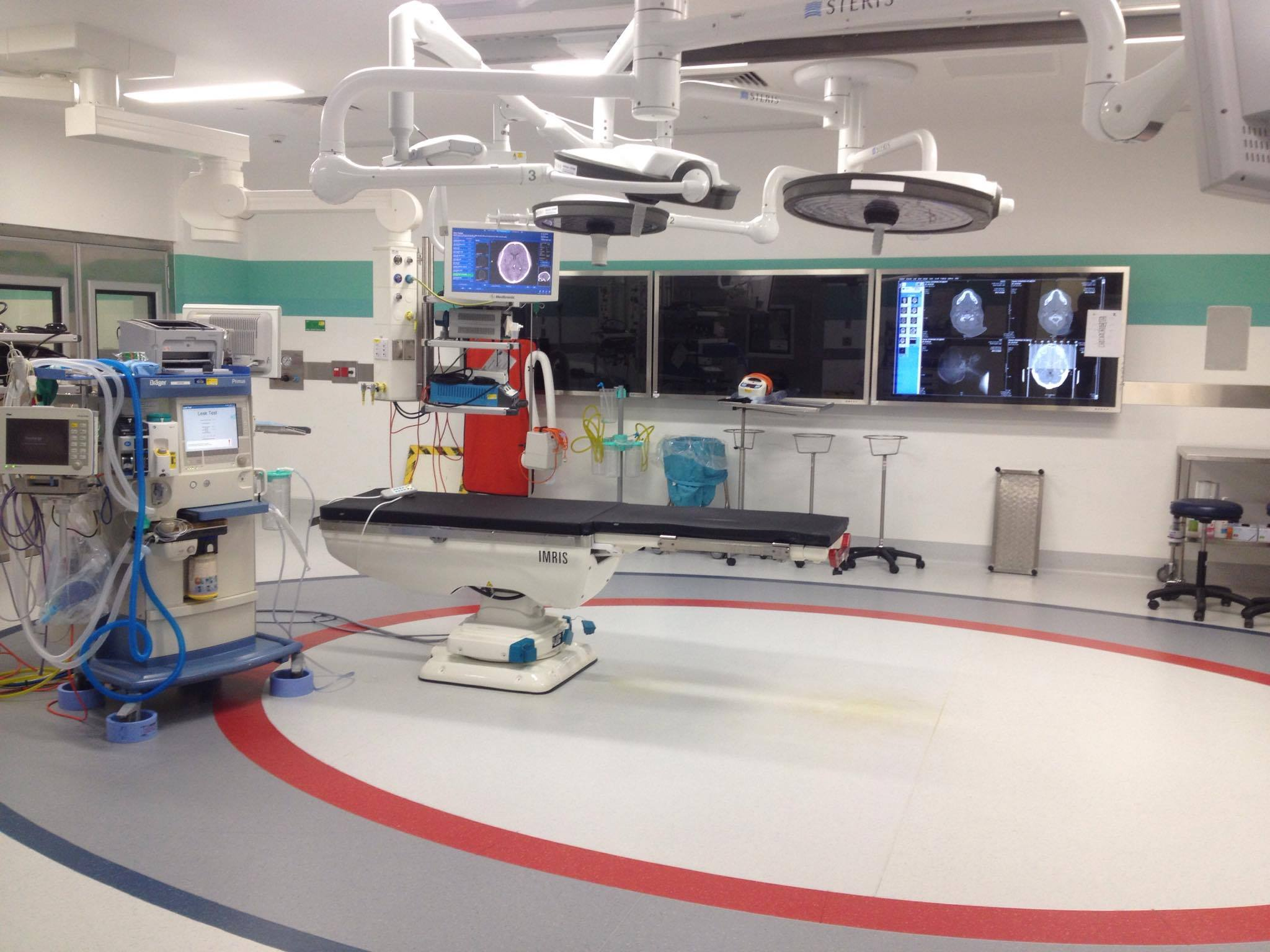
- An interventional radiology suite where biopsy, diagnosis or therapies are precisely guided with real-time fluoroscopy
- Specialty: Interventional radiologist

Interventional radiologist
Occupation
- Names: Physician; Radiologist
- Occupation type: Specialty
- Activity sectors: Medicine, surgery

Description
- Education required: Doctor of Medicine (M.D.) Radiology; Doctor of Osteopathic medicine (D.O.); Bachelor of Medicine, Bachelor of Surgery (M.B.B.S.); Bachelor of Medicine, Bachelor of Surgery (MBChB)
- Fields of employment: Hospitals, clinics

Interventional radiology (IR) is a medical specialty that performs various minimally-invasive procedures using medical imaging guidance, such as x-ray fluoroscopy, computed tomography, magnetic resonance imaging, or ultrasound. IR performs both diagnostic and therapeutic procedures through very small incisions or body orifices. Diagnostic IR procedures are those intended to help make a diagnosis or guide further medical treatment, and include image-guided biopsy of a tumor or injection of an imaging contrast agent into a hollow structure, such as a blood vessel or a duct. By contrast, therapeutic IR procedures provide direct treatment—they include catheter-based medicine delivery, medical device placement (e.g., stents), and angioplasty of narrowed structures.

The main benefits of IR techniques are that they can reach the deep structures of the body through a body orifice or tiny incision using small needles and wires. This decreases risks, pain, and recovery compared to open procedures. Real-time visualization also allows precision guidance to the abnormality, making the procedure or diagnosis more accurate. These benefits are weighed against the additional risks of lack of immediate access to internal structures (should bleeding or a perforation occur), and the risks of radiation exposure such as cataracts and cancer.

== Types ==
=== Common elements ===
Interventional radiology is a set of techniques that allows access to the internal structures of the body through body orifices or very small incisions and guidance with medical imaging. Regardless of the reason for the intervention, the procedure will likely use common elements such as a puncture needle (to pass through the skin), guidewires (to guide through structures such as blood vessels or the biliary or urinary systems), a sheath (which slides over the guidewire and holds the path open without injuring it), and catheters (that allow fluids to be pushed through them).

Also common to all intervention radiology procedures are the medical imaging machines that allow the healthcare provider to see what is occurring within the body. Some use X-rays (such as CT and fluoroscopy) and some do not (such as ultrasound and MRI). In each case, the images created may be modified by computer to better visualize the structures as is in the case with digital subtraction angiography, CT and MRI, or the display of the images improved with virtual reality or augmented reality presentation.

=== Diagnostic interventional radiology ===
- Angiography: Imaging the blood vessels to look for abnormalities with the use of various contrast media, including iodinated contrast, gadolinium based agents, and CO_{2} gas.
- Cholangiography: Imaging the bile ducts within the liver to look for areas of blockage.
- Biopsy: Taking of a tissue sample from the area of interest for pathological examination from a percutaneous or transvenous approach.
- Fine-needle aspiration: obtaining cells from a tissue or organ under ultrasound guidance.

=== Therapeutic interventional radiology ===
Vascular

- Balloon angioplasty/stent: Opening of narrow or blocked blood vessels using a balloon, with or without placement of metallic stents to aid in keep vessel patent.
- Endovascular aneurysm repair: Placement of endovascular stent-graft across an aneurysm to prevent expansion or progression of the defective vessel.
- Embolization: Placement of a metallic coil or embolic substance (gel-foam, poly-vinyl alcohol) to block blood through to a blood vessel, either to stop bleeding or decrease blood flow to a target organ or tissue.
  - Uterine artery embolization (UAE) or uterine fibroid embolization (UFE)
  - Prostate artery embolization (PAE)
  - Pulmonary arteriovenous malformation (PAVM) embolization
  - Hemorrhoidal artery embolization (HAE)
  - Splenic artery embolization (SAE)
- Thrombolysis: Catheter-directed technique for dissolving blood clots, such as pulmonary embolism and deep venous thrombosis, with either pharmaceutical (TPA) or mechanical means.
- IVC filters: Metallic filters placed in the vena cava to prevent propagation of deep venous thrombus.
- Dialysis-related interventions: Placement of tunneled hemodialysis catheters, peritoneal dialysis catheters, and revision/thrombolysis of poorly functioning surgically placed AV fistulas and grafts.
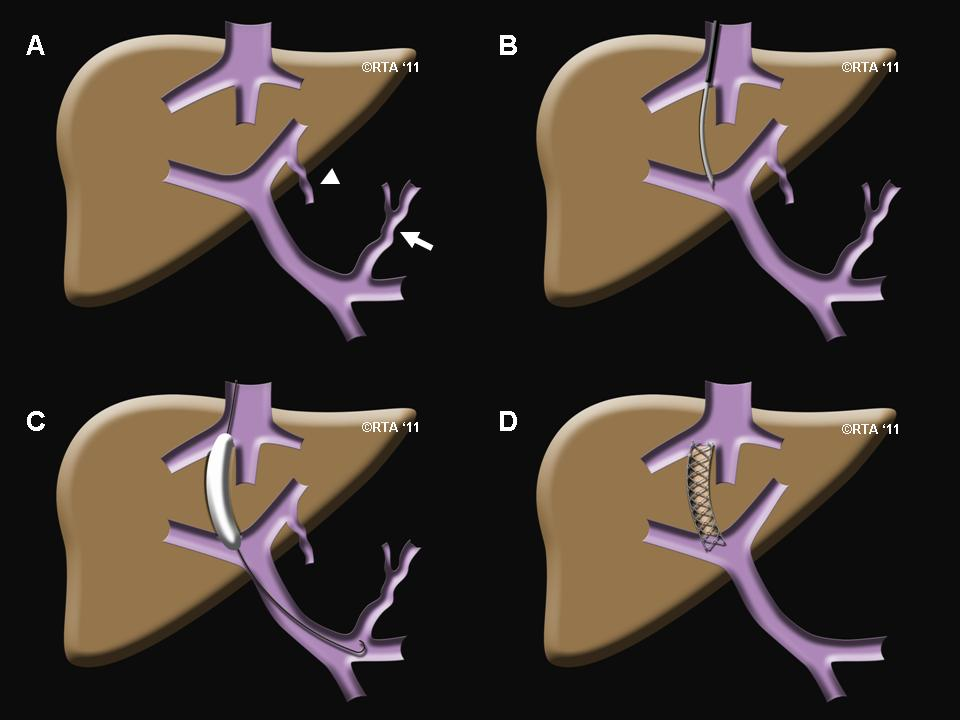
- TIPS procedure schematic
  TIPS: Placement of a transjugular intrahepatic porto-systemic shunt (TIPS) for select indications in patients with critical end-stage liver disease and portal hypertension.
- Endovenous laser treatment of varicose veins: Placement of thin laser fiber in varicose veins for non-surgical treatment of venous insufficiency.
- Chemoembolization: Combined injection of chemotherapy and embolic agents into the arterial blood supply of a tumor, with the goal of both local administration of chemotherapy, slowing "washout" of the chemotherapy drug, and also decreasing tumor arterial supply
- Radioembolization: Combined injection of radioactive glass or plastic beads and embolic agents into the arterial blood supply of a tumor, with the goal of both local administration of radiotherapy, slowing "washout" of the radioactive substance, and also decreasing tumor arterial supply

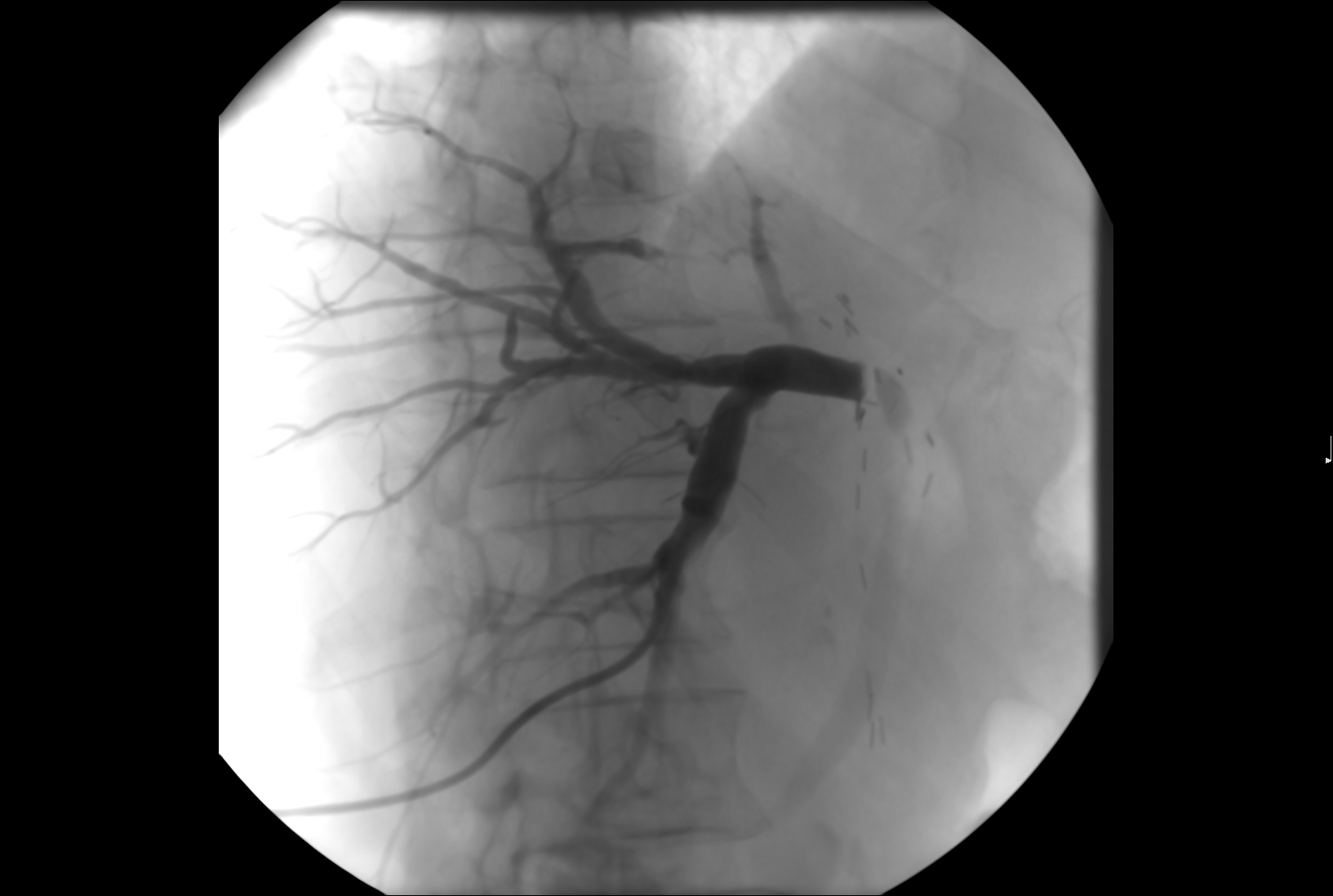
Biliary stenosis

Biliary intervention

- Placement of catheters in the biliary system to bypass biliary obstructions and decompress the biliary system.
- Placement of permanent indwelling biliary stents.
- Cholecystostomy: Placement of a tube into the gallbladder to remove infected bile in patients with cholecystitis, an inflammation of the gallbladder, who are too frail or too sick to undergo surgery.

Catheter placement

- Central venous catheter placement: Vascular access and management of intravenous devices (IVs), including both tunneled and non-tunneled catheters (e.g., PIC, Hickman, port catheters, hemodialysis catheters, translumbar and transhepatic venous lines).
- Drainage catheter placement: Placement of tubes to drain pathologic fluid collections (e.g., abscess, pleural effusion). This may be achieved by percutaneous, trans-rectal, or trans-vaginal approach. Exchange or repositioning of indwelling catheters is achieved over a guidewire under image guidance.
- Radiologically inserted gastrostomy or jejunostomy: Placement of a feeding tube percutaneously into the stomach and/or jejunum.

Ablative

- Radiofrequency ablation (RF/RFA): Local treatment in which a special catheter destroys tissue with heat generated by medium frequency alternating currents
- Cryoablation: Local treatment with a special catheter that destroys tissue with cold temperature generated by rapid expansion of compressed argon gas—used mostly to treat small renal cancers and for the palliation of painful bone lesions
- Microwave ablation: Local treatment with a special catheter that destroys tissue with heat generated by microwaves

Genitourinary

- Percutaneous nephrostomy or nephroureteral stent placement: Placement of a catheter through the skin, directly into the kidney to drain from the collecting system. This is typically done to treat a downstream obstruction of urine.
- Ureteral stent exchange: indwelling double-J type ureteral stents, typically placed by urologist using cystoscopy, may be exchanged in retrograde fashion through the female urethra. The IR uses a thin wire snare under fluoroscopy to capture the distal portion of the stent. After partially extracting the distalmost stent, exchange for a new stent can be accomplished over a guidewire.

== Techniques for specific disorders ==
=== Gastrointestinal intervention ===
==== Gastrointestinal hemorrhage ====
The treatment of gastrointestinal hemorrhage can range anywhere from monitoring an asymptomatic bleed to supporting and maintaining the hemodynamic function of the patient. The role for the interventional radiologist is to offer patients an image-guided, minimally invasive procedure to alleviate a condition that could be otherwise be potentially life-threatening.

The avenue for the interventional radiologist to dictate the clinical course of a GI bleed is largely influenced by location of bleed, overall patient health and other conditions the patient may have, most notably heart and liver functions. For most cases, collaboration between the gastroenterologist and interventional radiologist optimizes patient outcome but again, is largely dictated by anatomical location of the GI bleed. If a patient is evaluated and determined to be a candidate for an interventional procedure, then the bleed is often treated by embolization. Embolization is a process in which the interventional radiologist accesses the culprit bleeding vessel via a small catheter and interrupts blood flow to the site of bleeding via various mechanisms. Side effects of this procedure are minimal but there is a risk of bleeding and infection—though much less than the equivalent surgical procedure. When successful, the procedure often eliminates the bleed and patients can walk after a few hours of rest.

=== Hepatobiliary intervention ===
==== Transjugular intrahepatic portosystemic shunt ====
A transjugular intrahepatic portosystemic shunt (TIPS) is a procedure an interventional radiologist performs to create a shunt (essentially, a new conduit allowing for blood flow) between the hepatic inferior vena cava and the portal vein, a vessel that returns blood from the intestines to the liver. The portal vein is the site where hypertension (high blood pressure) can produce a myriad of deleterious effects throughout the liver and small or large intestine.

Primarily, a TIPS functions to alleviate two different conditions: an emergent/life-threatening GI bleed or ascites (excessive abdominal fluid) caused by too high of blood pressure in the portal vein that is otherwise uncontrolled by diet and medications.

The workup for the procedure is straightforward and the interventional radiologist performing the procedure often orders several tests to assess how well the patient will tolerate the procedure. These are often simple blood tests, and an ultrasound of the heart and liver. The procedure is often well tolerated and can result in a permanent reduction or elimination of symptoms. The procedure can take anywhere between 15 minutes to an hour and has lower risks of bleeding or infection compared to an equivalent surgical procedure.

A TIPS may cause temporary confusion or worsening of liver/heart function. The degree of these two side effects largely depends on the health of the patient's heart and liver prior to the procedure and the risk-benefits of the procedure must be thoroughly discussed with their interventional radiologist before beginning. If the post-procedural consequences are more troublesome to the patient than their initial symptoms the artificial conduit created by the procedure can be reversed if the post-procedural side effects outweigh those caused by the prior conditions.

In some cases, a TIPS could form a blood clot, called a thrombus. A interventional radiologist would intervene to open up the shunt again by performing a mechanical thrombectomy. This procedure involves removing the thrombus from the TIPS. This would allow the patient to regain the initial benefits from the TIPS creation.

==== Biliary intervention ====
In addition to normal liver tissue, the liver has three main vessels traversing it: the portal arteriole, the portal venule and the bile ducts. While bile is made in the liver and stored in the gallbladder, the bile eventually passes into the GI tract through the hepatic, cystic and common bile ducts. Any disease preventing the normal flow of bile from the liver, through these bile vessels and into the GI tract can lead to liver disease and jaundice.

While jaundice can be caused by a few viruses that the human body can naturally clear, jaundice in the setting of an obstruction is usually caused by a cancer and can result in intolerable itching and a worsening of liver function that can be life-threatening. Depending on a patient's condition, this type of obstructive jaundice can be alleviated with surgery or chemotherapy but if these measures fail to restore proper flow of bile, an interventional radiologist can perform a procedure called a percutaneous transhepatic cholangiography (PTC).

A PTC is an outpatient procedure lasting anywhere from 15 minutes to an hour where an interventional radiologist accesses the patient's bile duct system with a needle through the skin and liver under imaging guidance. Using fluoroscopy (essentially an X-ray camera) to guide a wire (followed by a catheter over the wire) through the bile duct system and into the GI tract, essentially restoring the normal flow of bile. If the patient's GI tract cannot be accessed due to the obstruction, the catheter can be placed to drain the bile duct system into a bag that the patient can wear during daily activities. Risks of this procedure include bleeding and infection but these are much lower than an equivalent surgical procedure.

=== Genitourinary intervention ===
==== Benign prostatic hyperplasia ====
Benign prostatic hyperplasia, or BPH, is a noncancerous condition that commonly affects men over the age of 50. The prostate gland enlarges and compresses the adjacent urethra, making it difficult for men to control frequency and/or urgency of urination. First-line therapy involves medication, though long-term treatment for symptoms that are persistent despite medical optimization typically involves transurethral resection of the prostate (TURP) as the "gold standard" of care. However, TURP can lead to urinary incontinence or permanent male infertility and may not be the ideal procedure for a certain subset of patients. For those reasons, a physician may recommend undergoing a treatment known as prostate artery embolization (PAE).

Patients typically go home the same day as the procedure and can expect to feel some symptom relief in a matter of days. Though rare, risks of PAE include unintentional embolization of nearby blood vessels, which can result in loss of blood flow to surrounding areas of the bladder or rectum.

Data suggests that TURP may have higher rates of symptom resolution at one and six months, but PAE appears to provide lower risks of complications more commonly associated with surgery, such as infection.

==== Kidney stone disease ====
Kidney stones can be present along any part of the course of the urinary tract from the kidneys to the urethra. The most common symptoms, whether in men or women, are sudden onset, intense flank pain accompanied by blood in the urine. Most kidney stones pass spontaneously, but larger ones (greater than 5 mm) are less likely to, and can cause severe pain or infection.

The interventional radiologist plays a large clinical role in the treatment of kidney stones that are unlikely to pass on their own. The gold standard of treatment for these types of stones is surgical removal. However, some patients have an infected stone and are simply too ill for an operative surgical removal. In these instances, the mainstay of IR treatment is a percutaneous nephrostomy tube. This is a procedure where a small caliber catheter is placed through the skin and into the urinary collecting system upstream of the stone. This procedure not only drains any infection, often bringing about a precipitous improvement in the patient's symptoms but also diverts urine—thus giving the patient more time to recover before definitive surgical treatment.

==== Varicocele ====
A varicocele is defined as an enlargement of the veins within the scrotum, most commonly occurring on the left side due to anatomical reasons. When this happens, blood can stagnate within these dilated veins and cause temperature fluctuations within the testicle itself. The exact cause to this condition remains unknown and an ill-favored sequela can be male infertility.

The mainstay of treatment for this condition within the field of interventional radiology is varicocele embolization. An embolization, within the context of this procedure, results in the interruption of venous blood flow. The interruption of blood flow abates venous dilation of blood that can lead to impaired testicular temperature regulation and theoretically improve infertility. The physician accesses the dilated scrotal veins with a small catheter via a vein in the groin and embolizes the varicocele. Patients often tolerate this procedure well and are able to return home the same day.

=== Neurological intervention ===
==== Acute ischemic stroke ====
About 87% of all strokes are ischemic strokes, in which blood flow to the brain is blocked. A clot-busting medication such as tissue plasminogen activator (t-PA) can be used in a controlled hospital setting to dissolve the clot and help restore blood flow to the damaged area of the brain. Certain patients with an acute ischemic stroke may be candidates for endovascular therapy. Endovascular therapy is a procedure performed by neurointerventionalists to remove or dissolve the thrombus (clot) and restore blood flow to parts of the brain. Using a catheter that is directed through the blood vessels in the arm or leg up to the brain, the interventionalist can remove the thrombus or deliver drugs to dissolve the thrombus. These procedures are referred to as mechanical thrombectomy or thrombolysis, and several factors are considered before the procedure is completed.

People who may be eligible for endovascular treatment have a large vessel occlusion, which means the thrombus is in an artery that is large enough to reach and there are no contraindications such as a hemorrhagic stroke (bleeding in the brain), elapsed time of greater than six hours since onset of symptoms, or greater than 24 hours in special cases. Hospitals with comprehensive stroke centers are equipped to treat patients with endovascular care.

Long-term care after an ischemic stroke is focused on rehabilitation and preventing future blood clots using anticoagulant therapy. Patients work with specialists from fields such as physical therapy, occupational therapy, and speech therapy to complete recovery.

==== Intracranial aneurysm ====
Although there are no clearly defined recommendations on treatment of asymptomatic aneurysms, all symptomatic unruptured brain aneurysms should be treated. Endovascular therapy is an effective treatment for select cases. During this treatment, an interventional radiologist inserts a catheter into the patient's leg and uses it to guide a coil through blood vessels to the site of the aneurysm. The coil induces clotting within the aneurysm, which reduces the risk of rupture. Multiple coils may be used depending on the size. Imaging studies (DSA, CTA, or MRA) help characterize the aneurysm to decide the best course of treatment, whether endovascular coiling or surgical clipping. Endovascular coiling is associated with a reduction in procedural morbidity and mortality over surgical. For cases of ruptured aneurysms, emergent treatment is based on the type of aneurysm, and may use a combination of techniques. Conservative therapy focuses on minimizing modifiable risk factors with blood pressure control and smoking cessation.

==== Cerebral arteriovenous malformation ====
Arteriovenous malformations (AVMs) are abnormal blood vessel structures in which an artery connects to a vein via an abnormal channel. This creates a high flow system that puts the vessel at risk of rupture. Ruptured AVMs require emergency management of the patient; unruptured AVMs require expert consultation to discuss the risks and benefits of treatment. Current treatment options include conservative management, surgical resection, stereotactic radiosurgery, endovascular embolization, or combinations of these treatments. Endovascular embolization is a technique used by neurointerventionalists in which particles, glue, or coils are lodged inside the AVM to prevent blood flow through the abnormal channel. During this treatment, an interventional radiologist guides a catheter through a blood vessel accessed from the patient's leg to the site of the AVM. The particles, glue, or coils induce clotting within the malformation, which reduces the risk of rupture.

=== Pain management ===
==== Joint and local injections ====
Utilizing image guidance, local anesthetics and/or long-acting steroid medications can be directly delivered to localized sites of pain. The use of image guidance helps to confirm appropriate needle placement. This includes common imaging modalities used in joint injections: ultrasound, fluoroscopy and computerized tomography (CT).

===== Facet joints =====
- Facet joints, also known as zygapophyseal joints, refer to small bony structures located between the vertebrae of the spine that promote spinal stability.
- Degeneration or damage to the facet joints can often lead to facet joint syndrome, which can be both diagnosed and treated by image-guided injection of anesthetics.
- Facet joint block is a minimally invasive procedure in which a physician uses fluoroscopy or CT imaging to guide the placement of an injection of medication into a facet joint to provide pain relief.

===== Sacroiliac joints =====
- The sacroiliac joint is a structure that is located at the bottom of the spine, and connects the spine to hips. The purpose of this joint is to help the spine bear the weight of the upper region of the body. The sacroiliac joint also decreases the incidence of injuries by improving overall stability and restricting the torso's range of movement.
- A sacroiliac joint injection is typically performed to decrease persistent back pain that developed due to an injured or inflamed sacroiliac joint.

===== Epidural space =====
- In the spine, the epidural space is an anatomic space that is the outermost part of the spinal canal. It is the space within the canal (formed by the surrounding vertebrae) lying outside the dura mater (which encloses the arachnoid mater, subarachnoid space, the cerebrospinal fluid, and the spinal cord).
- Injection of local anesthetics is often performed to treat local pain or radiculopathy, particularly due to disc herniation or central/foraminal stenosis.
- Usually performed under fluoroscopic guidance.

===== Selective nerve root injection =====
- A spinal nerve root is the initial or proximal segment of one of the thirty-one pairs of spinal nerves leaving the central nervous system from the spinal cord.
- Damage to nerve roots can cause paresis and paralysis of the muscle innervated by the affected spinal nerve. It can also cause pain and numbness in the corresponding dermatome. A common cause of damage to the nerve roots are lesions in the spine, such as prolapse of the nucleus pulposus, spinal tuberculosis, cancer, inflammation and spinal tabes. Root pain syndromes, known colloquially as radiculitis (i.e., sciatica) are one of the most common symptoms caused by damage to the nerve root.
- Used to treat patients with radicular symptoms in the cervical, thoracic, lumbar or sacral region.
- Helps to alleviate pain by dealing with inflammation of the nerve root.

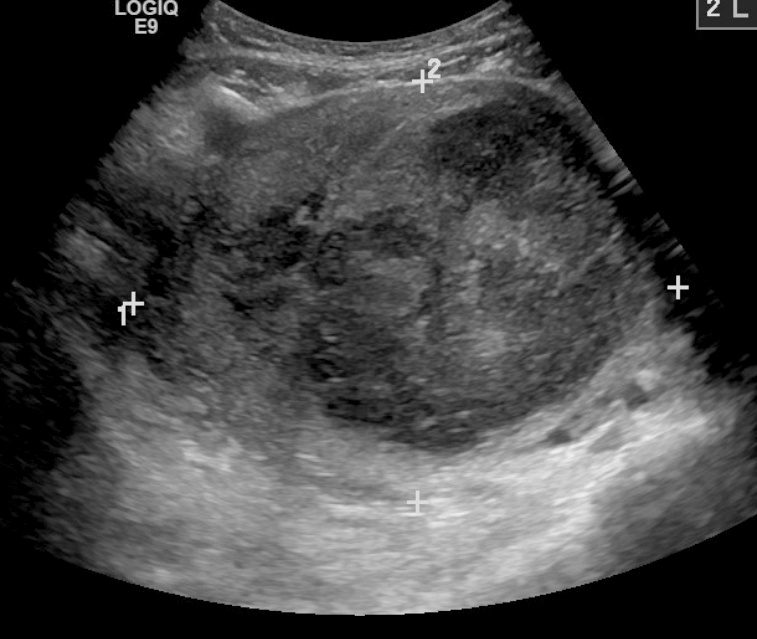
A very large (9 cm or 3.5 in) fibroid of the uterus causing pelvic congestion

==== Chronic pelvic pain ====
- Veins have one-way valves that help blood flow toward the heart. If the valves are weak or damaged, blood can pool in veins, making them swell. When this happens near the pelvis, it is called pelvic congestion syndrome, which can lead to chronic pain beneath the level of the belly button.
- Pelvic congestion syndrome usually affects women who have previously been pregnant, because the ovarian veins and pelvic veins had widened to accommodate the increased blood flow from the uterus during pregnancy. After the pregnancy, some of these veins remain enlarged and fail to return to their previous size, causing them to weaken and allowing blood to pool.
- An interventional radiologist can offer a minimally invasive treatment option for pelvic congestion syndrome: ovarian vein embolization
- Ovarian vein embolization is a same-day treatment which takes place in an interventional radiology suite. The interventional radiologist gains access through a large vein in the groin, called the femoral vein, by using a small catheter, which is a flexible tube like a strand of spaghetti. The catheter is moved through the vein to the enlarged pelvic veins, allowing the introduction of embolic agents, which are medications that cause the vein to seal off and relieve the painful pressure.
  - This treatment can be less expensive than surgery and is much less invasive.
- A number of diagnostic tests can be performed through minimally invasive methods, to determine whether a patient's chronic pelvic pain is a result of pelvic varicose veins. These tests include:
  - Pelvic and transvaginal ultrasound
  - Pelvic venogram
  - Computed tomography (CT)
  - Magnetic resonance imaging (MRI)

==== Palliative care ====
- Palliative care is an interdisciplinary approach to specialized medical and nursing care for people with life-limiting illnesses. It focuses on providing relief from the symptoms, pain, physical stress, and mental stress at any stage of illness. The goal is to improve quality of life for both the person and their family.
- The interventional radiologist may be well suited to work in a hospice setting and with palliative medicine providers. Radiologists have extensive experience in diagnostic image interpretation and disease prognostication. Additionally, the interventional radiologist may be able to present the patient with therapeutic and palliative interventions aimed to increase their quality of life in dying.

==== Nerve block/ablations ====
- Injection of medication or anesthetic to decrease inflammation or "turn off" a pain signal along a specific distribution of nerve.
- Block vs. ablation: Although these terms are often used interchangeably, they differ in terms of duration of action.
  - Nerve block: "temporary disruption of the disruption of pain transmission via the celiac plexus and is accomplished by injecting corticosteroids or long-acting local anesthetics".
  - Neurolysis: "permanent destruction of the celiac plexus with ethanol or phenol".
- Types of blocks/neurolyses:
  - Celiac plexus block/neurolysis: A procedure performed to manage refractory cancer-related abdominal pain by modulating the celiac plexus, which is a network of nerve fibers located in the retroperitoneum along the anterolateral wall of the aorta.
    - Often used in the management of incurable pancreatic cancer.
    - Often utilizes multidetector CT for image guidance.
  - Superior hypogastric plexus block/neurolysis: A procedure performed to manage refractory abdominal/pelvis pain by modulating the superior hypogastric plexus, which is a network of nerve fibers located in the retroperitoneum that modulate pain from the bladder, vulva, vagina, uterus, urethra, penis, perineum, prostate, testes, rectum, and colon.
  - Lumbar sympathetic block: A procedure performed to manage pain originating from the lower back, buttocks or legs.
    - Common indications: complex regional pain syndrome (CRPS)/regional sympathetic dystrophy (RDS), post-herpetic neuralgia, neuropathy.
  - Pudendal nerve block: A procedure performed to manage chronic pelvic pain.
    - Common indications: pudendal neuralgia (i.e., repetitive use from cycling), cancer-related pain
  - Sphenopalatine ganglion block
    - A procedure performed to manage head and neck pain/headaches related to the trigeminal nerve, usually in the treatment of migraine headaches.

==== Palliative bone/musculoskeletal ====
- The standard of care for local treatment of extraspinal osseous metastases is external-beam radiation therapy. Fifty percent of patients who undergo this therapy achieve complete response or resolution of symptoms. Of the remaining patients, half fail therapy (20–30% of the total), 10% require retreatment, and 1–3% experience debilitating complications such as fracture of the treated bone.
- Due to the need for multiple treatments requiring multiple transports to and from the hospital and potential disruption to treatment/therapy, minimally invasive options in the treatment of extraspinal osseous metastases have emerged as attractive options in management of symptomatic metastases. These typically take the form of three types of ablative therapy: microwave thermal ablation, radiofrequency ablation ("coblation") and cryoablation.
  - Microwave thermal ablation
    - Microwave ablation is a treatment that uses heat to treat tumors. An interventional radiologist makes a tiny incision in the skin to insert a special needle into the body. Using a live computed tomography (CT) scan or an ultrasound, the doctor guides the needle to the tumor. The interventional radiologist generates electromagnetic microwaves that can destroy the tumor.
    - The advantages of microwave ablation (removal of tissue) compared to radiofrequency ablation include a generation of higher temperatures and the ability to use multiple needles to better destroy larger tumors.
    - After the treatment, patients follow up with their physician for several months. The treatment team also orders additional imaging scans to evaluate whether the microwave ablation successfully destroyed the tumor.
  - Plasma-mediated radiofrequency ablation ("coblation")
    - Radiofrequency ablation is a treatment that uses heat to destroy multiple small tumors. An interventional radiologist makes a tiny incision and uses either a computed tomography (CT) scan or ultrasound to guide a special needle to the site of the tumors. Next, radiofrequency (RF) electrodes are placed into the tumor. The electrodes generate an electric current (RF energy), which produces heat that destroys the tumor. This technique can be repeated at multiple sites, as necessary, before the interventional radiologist removes the RF electrode.
    - After the treatment, patients follow up with their physician for several months. The treatment team orders additional imaging scans to evaluate whether the radiofrequency ablation successfully destroyed the tumor.
  - Cryoablation
    - Cryoablation is a treatment option that destroys cancer cells by applying extremely cold temperatures at the location of the tumor. A small cut is made in the skin and a tiny needle called a cryoprobe is inserted. Using image-guidance—either by a computed tomography (CT) scan or by ultrasound—the interventional radiologist maneuvers the cryoprobe toward the location of the tumor.
    - Next, the cryoprobes are inserted into the tumor to begin freezing it with a gas called argon, creating an "ice ball" over the entire tumor to freeze it for about ten minutes. Nitrogen gas is then used to thaw the tumor for five minutes. This cycle is repeated two or three times depending on the tumor type and size.

==== Vertebral augmentation ====
Vertebral augmentation, which includes vertebroplasty and kyphoplasty, are similar spinal procedures in which bone cement is injected through a small hole in the skin into a fractured vertebra to try to relieve back pain caused by a vertebral compression fractures. It was found ineffective in treating osteoporosis-related compression fractures of the spine. The people in both the experimental and placebo groups reported improvement in their pain, suggesting that the benefit is related to the placebo effect. As of 2019, routine use is thus not recommended.

==== Sacroplasty ====
- Sacral insufficiency fractures are an infrequent but often disabling cause of severe low back pain. At times, the pain can be so severe that it may cause the patients to become bedridden, placing them at risk for complications of immobility such as deep vein thrombosis, pulmonary emboli, muscle atrophy, decubitus ulcers, and bone demineralization. Until the development of the sacroplasty technique, there was no definitive treatment other than bed rest.
- Sacral insufficiency fractures result from an axial loading mechanism on abnormal bone, such as osteoporosis or underlying neoplasm.
- Analogous to vertebroplasty, the purpose of sacroplasty is to provide stabilization to prevent painful micromotion at the fracture site. A needle is placed through the skin and into the bone under CT guidance and a polymethylmethacrylate mixture is injected into the sacrum under real-time fluoroscopy.
- Sacroplasty is a safe and effective procedure in the treatment of sacral insufficiency fractures that can provide substantial pain relief and lead to a better quality of life.

=== Interventional oncology ===
==== Procedures performed ====
- Image-guided ablation: Uses different types of energy to burn (radiofrequency ablation (RFA) and microwave ablation (MWA)), deliver electrical fields/electroporate (irreversible electroporation (IRE)) or freeze (cryoablation) solid tumors resulting in tumor cell death. Ablation techniques can be performed throughout the body such as in the lung, liver, kidney, prostate, breast, bone, and other organs using image guidance to place a needle/probe through the skin into the target tissue.
- High intensity focused ultrasound: Uses a machine that emits high frequency sound waves to kill cancer cells and provide relief for tumor-related pain, such as in the bone.
- Transarterial embolization (TAE)/bland embolization: Injection of embolic material (microparticles, alcohol, glue) through a catheter into the arteries feeding a tumor to completely occlude the tumor's blood supply and cause cell death. The most common indication is for treatment of unresectable liver cancer (hepatocellular carcinoma).
- Transarterial chemoembolization (TACE): Injection of a chemotherapy agent often with microparticles through a catheter into arteries feeding a tumor that both delivers chemotherapy and blocks the blood supply to the tumor to cause cell death
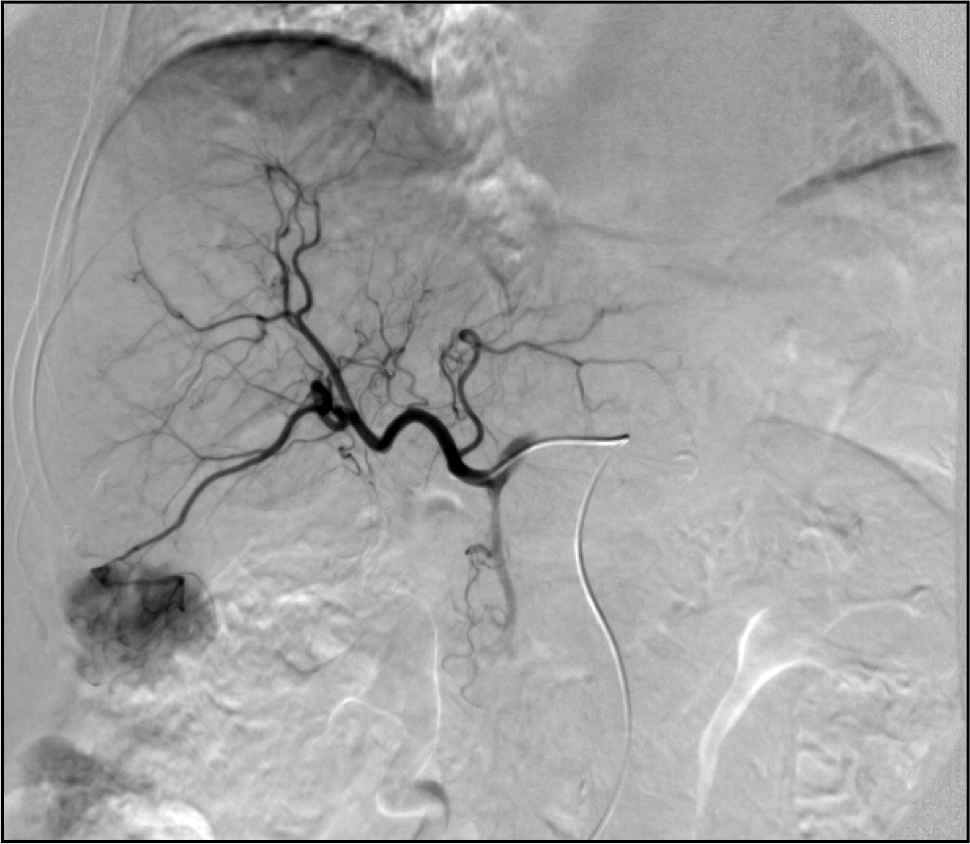
  TACE
- Can be performed in different ways:
  - Conventional transarterial chemoembolization (cTACE): Injection of lipiodol with high dose chemotherapy with or without microparticles directly into the tumor-feeding arteries.
  - Drug eluting bead transarterial chemoembolization (DEB-TACE): delivery of microparticles that are themselves loaded with the chemotherapy agent—typically doxorubicin or irinotecan.
- Selective internal radiation therapy (also known as SIRT or Y-90 radioembolization): Injection of small beads loaded with a radioactive isotope, yittrium-90 (Y-90), into blood vessels feeding a tumor to deliver a lethal dose of radiation to cause cell death. This can be performed in a segmental (radiation segmentectomy) or a lobar (radiation lobectomy) fashion. Radiation lobectomy is commonly performed with the goal of inducing growth of the non-diseased lobe in order to have adequate liver function necessary to undergo surgical resection.
- Portal vein embolization (PVE): delivery of embolic material into the portal vein feeding the lobe of liver containing the tumor(s) of interest to induce growth of the non-diseased lobe to maintain adequate liver function necessary to undergo surgical resection of lobe containing the tumor(s).

==== Diseases treated ====
Interventional oncology (IO) procedures are commonly applied to treat primary or metastatic cancer. IO treatments may be also offered in combination with surgery, systemic chemotherapy/immunotherapy, and radiation therapy to augment the therapeutic outcome. A variety of interventional oncological treatments for tumors arise:

- Liver cancer: primary liver tumors such as hepatocellular carcinoma or cholangiocarcinoma and liver metastases are often treated by procedures such as transarterial chemoembolization (TACE), Selective internal radiation therapy (SIRT/Y-90 radioembolization), portal vein embolization, transarterial/bland embolization, or image guided ablation (RFA, MWA, IRE, cryoablation)
- Lung cancer: lung metastases or inoperable primary lung cancer can be treated by interventional radiology procedures such as image guided ablation (cryoablation, microwave ablation and radiofrequency ablation).
- Kidney cancer: kidney tumors such as renal cell carcinoma can be treated with image-guided ablation (RFA, MWA, cryotherapy) with similar results to partial nephrectomy. Generally, surgery via an either partial or total nephrectomy (removal of kidney) is most often curative but for patients with a smaller lesion or who are not ideal surgical candidates, radiofrequency or cryoablation ablation can be a curative option. Advantages of cryoablation include the ability to visualize the ice ball as well as use more than one probe simultaneously to create the desired ice ball shape. Benign kidney tumors such as angiomyolipomas can be treated with transarterial embolization to shrink the tumor size and reduce the risk of rupture/bleeding. Other embolizations are also performed for symptom relief or prior to surgery to reduce bleeding.
- Bone cancer: bone metastases located in the spine, pelvis and long bones can be treated with image-guided ablative techniques (RFA, MWA, cryoablation, electrocorporation) with or without injection of cement (cementoplasty) to stabilize the bone. These treatments may be palliatively for bone metastases pain, or for some cases such as osteoid osteoma, can curatively treat tumors. Embolizations are also performed for prior to surgery to reduce bleeding.
- Breast cancer: for small, solitary breast cancer, image-guided ablative techniques are used to treat tumors; however, their efficacy versus surgical resection has not yet been studied.
- Prostate cancer: inoperable tumors can be treated with image-guided ablative techniques, and more recently, irreversible electroporation.
- Pancreatic cancer: inoperable, or borderline resectable, locally advanced pancreatic adenocarcinoma can be treated with irreversible electroporation.

=== Vascular disease ===
Vascular disease refers to disorders of the vascular system, most commonly involving the arteries and veins The symptoms related to vascular disease can range from asymptomatic, bothersome symptoms or limb- and/or life-threatening conditions. People with vascular disease may also experience disease in their broader circulatory system, such lymphatic disease

Interventional radiology plays a critical role in the management of vascular malformations and vascular interventional radiology is designated as a subspecialty of interventional radiology in some countries.

==== Basics of vascular intervention ====
Since its development by Charles Dotter when he did a percutaneous peripheral vascular revascularization procedure for the first time on January 16, 1964, on Laura Shaw, vascular and interventional radiology (commonly interventional radiology or IR) distinguished itself from earlier approaches to vascular disease by the use of medical imaging to guide endovascular therapies (fixing this from inside the vessel). The Seldinger technique is the basic principle that underlies endovascular procedures. Briefly, this involves using a needle to puncture a target vessel, then using a series of small medical guidewires and catheters to pass various tools inside for treatment. When these minimally-invasive techniques can be used, patients avoid the need for larger surgical exposure to treat diseased vessels. Though numerous factors can affect patient's post-operative course, in general an endovascular approach is associated with a more positive outcome although slightly increasing the need for further interventions compared to a traditional open vascular surgery.

Many endovascular procedures have since been developed and refined. Numerous tools are at the disposal of modern vascular and interventional radiologists to perform these procedures, and developing new tools is a focus of international research.

While some interventional radiology endovascular procedures are highly specialized, a few standard techniques apply to most:

- Angiography: Sometimes referred to as traditional angiography, catheter angiography or digital subtraction angiography (DSA). A small needle is inserted into a blood vessel, then exchanged for a catheter over a wire. The catheter is directed at the vessel to be studied, and contrast is directly injected to evaluate the lumen under video X-ray. This is an older technique than modern CT angiography or MR angiography, but provides unique advantages. With a catheter in place, provocative maneuvers can be performed such as breath holds or instillation of vasodilators, to evaluate a patient's blood flow dynamically. This can reproduce symptoms and identify functional abnormalities in a vessel that a static CT or MR imaging cannot. Angiography provides the basis for all endovascular therapy.
- Balloon angiography: The foundational IR procedure. Small balloons can be inflated inside a narrowed vessel to open it. These can then be safely deflated and removed. Some balloons have a specialized surface material, such as fine razor blades ("cutting balloons") to crack the plaque or instill a coating of medicine ("drug-coated balloon") that keeps the vessel open longer.
- Stents and stent-grafts: Stents are used to provide a scaffold along a segment of diseased vessel. These are available in a variety of sizes to accommodate placement in vessels throughout the body from head to toe. Endografts are stents with fabric covering that are used for the treatment of bleeding or aneurysms. These devices typically come folded up very small on a scaffold, or delivery device, such as a balloon. Stents then expand into pipe-like cylinders to support a vessel wall and keep the pathway for blood flow as large as possible. Some stents are bare-metal, allowing blood to leak through the walls of the stent, while others have a thin covering that keeps flow moving through only from one open end to the other. These can be used for a variety of applications depending on the vessel and the nature of the disease. Sometimes multiple stents are deployed end-to-end or side by side to maintain laminar flow. Like balloons, some stents come coated with medicine to help prevent the treated vessel from closing again.
- Embolization: The goal of embolization is to decrease or stop flow only in a target vessel, while avoiding cutting off the flow to nearby non-target vessels. This can be performed to stop active bleeding (as in trauma) to limit anticipated blood loss (such as in a complex surgery), or to cut off blood supply to either an abnormal vessel (e.g. aneurysm) or abnormal structure (e.g. tumor). There are many embolic agents available, from metallic plugs and coils to various biologically compatible particles and glues. Depending on the clinical situation, embolization can be temporary or permanent.
- Thrombolysis and thrombectomy: The body forms blood clots as a natural protective mechanism against bleeding. However, when arising outside this context, blood clots can wreak havoc in the human body, including disabling strokes. Thrombolysis is the process of breaking down blood clots, by injecting them with powerful medications. Thrombectomy involves using a device to remove the clot directly.

The goal of endovascular therapy is to revascularize an affected or diseased vessel.

==== Arterial disease ====
Arteries are the component of the circulatory system that carry oxygenated blood away from the heart to the vital organs and extremities. Arteries have relatively thick, muscular walls, composed of multiple layers, because they transport freshly oxygenated blood through the body at relatively high pressures. Arterial diseases can affect one or multiple layers of the artery wall.

The aorta is the largest artery in the body, and the major aortic branches continue to divide multiple times, giving way to smaller arteries, muscular arterioles and thin-walled capillaries. In contrast to arteries, capillaries have thin single-layered walls, so oxygen and nutrients can be exchanged with tissues in capillary beds before the de-oxygenated blood is carried away by the venous system.

Perfusion refers to the flow of oxygen and nutrient rich blood into the capillary beds of the muscles and organs, this is critical for their function. The lack of adequate perfusion is referred to as ischemia and is typically the cause of symptoms related to vascular disease. The goal of revascularization therapies, whether endovascular or surgical, is to re-establish or optimize perfusion and stop ischemia.

Atherosclerosis refers to a progressive narrowing of the arteries due to atheroma, derived from the Greek word for 'gruel, porridge'. Atheromatous plaque is a mixture of fat and inflammatory debris that sticks to the inner walls of an artery. Plaque can be soft or become firm as it accrues layers of calcium, a byproduct of chronic inflammation. Atherosclerosis has no single cause but many recognized risk factors. Some risk factors are modifiable, and others are not. Age and genetic predispositions are examples of non-modifiable risk factors. Medical management of atherosclerosis aims to address the many other known modifiable risk factors, such as smoking, diet, and exercise, as well as blood sugar levels in patients with diabetes. Using medications to control blood pressure and cholesterol have also been shown beneficial.

Atherosclerosis is described, evaluated, and treated differently depending on the affected artery, as described below. However, multiple studies have shown strong correlations between the different types of atherosclerosis. In particular, patients with peripheral arterial disease have an increased risk of coronary artery disease, and severe peripheral artery disease symptoms can be a predictor of cardiac-related mortality. The majority of patients begin to develop symptoms from ischemia around middle age, even though vessel narrowing can develop silently and slowly over decades. Unfortunately, sudden cardiac death or stroke can be a patient's first sign of vascular disease. Therefore, controlling risk factors is crucial in those with known atherosclerosis to prevent progression of disease, and screening is recommended by some vascular disease specialists for those at increased risk, such as those with diabetes, smoking or a strong family history of cardiovascular disease.

Screening tests typically use the non-invasive evaluation called the ankle–brachial index, which compares the blood pressure between the arm and the ankle. This can help detect narrowing in the major vessels of the chest, abdomen, pelvis, and legs. CT scans of the heart with evaluations of coronary artery calcium are also used in some instances to stratify risk of coronary artery disease.

Historically, open vascular surgical approaches were required for all critically advanced atherosclerotic disease. An endarterectomy is a large operation, where blood flow is temporarily stopped using clamps, the vessel is cut open, the plaque removed and then the vessel resealed. If an occlusion is too dense or complex, a bypass could also be performed, where two segments of vessel are bridged by an additional vein or synthetic graft. Modern endovascular approaches to treating atherosclerosis can include combinations of angioplasty, stenting, and atherectomy (removal of plaque).

- Peripheral artery disease (PAD; sometimes peripheral vascular disease, PVD) is most often a result of atherosclerosis and affects the arteries of the lower extremities, those below the aortic bifurcation. A hallmark symptom is claudication, or progressive pain in a limb associated with activity, due to ischemia. As the perfusion to a limb diminishes, further pain in the foot can occur even at rest and in fact the tissues of the foot can even die.

There are several systems for staging PAD, but an often used scale is the revised Rutherford classification. Plaque and blood flow can be evaluated using ultrasound, CT angiography, MR angiography, and catheter-based angiography to establish anatomic segments of disease. The severity of ischemia can be evaluated by correlating symptoms and non-invasive physiologic vascular studies including toe pressures, TcpO2, and skin perfusion pressure studies.

Certain monitored exercises, such as walking regimens, have been shown to significantly improve walking distance especially when used consistently for at least six months. When medical management fails, vascular interventional radiologists can attempt to restore blood flow to extremities using angioplasty and stenting. Sometimes repeat interventions are required. The goal of therapy is to maintain perfusion, avoid amputation and preserve the limb structure and function.

- Critical limb ischemia (CLI) is a severe variant of PAD (Rutherford 4 and above) characterized by rest pain or tissue loss. Each year this affects just under 1% of the population, but develops in approximately 11% of PAD patients. Symptoms develop due to chronic ischemia from vessel plaque burden, which builds up over time. Rest pain is a continuous burning pain in the limb that is aggravated by elevating it and improved by dangling over the bed as the perfusion is so poor that it becomes gravity-dependent. Tissue loss refers to arterial insufficiency ulcers, which can progress to frank gangrene. Arterial ulcers are classically painful and located on the distal aspect of the extremities. A diagnosis of CLI incurs a higher risk of amputation (up to 25% within one year) and death (up to 25% within one year). This is a serious condition that requires multi-modality treatment. The goal of vascular interventional radiology and others who work in limb salvage is to minimize tissue loss by preserving direct blood flow to the affected limb by treating vessel blockages, controlling any infection and optimizing wound care. Increasingly, this can be accomplished with primary endovascular therapies before open surgery is considered.
- Acute limb ischaemia (ALI) occurs when blood flow to an extremity is abruptly cut off. It occurs most commonly in those with a history of atrial fibrillation or underlying PAD/PVD. Unlike chronic ischemia, which the body can partially adapt to, ALI is an emergency that can result in an amputation or even death if not treated in hours. It is typically due to an embolus from the heart or a thrombus that develops in a pre-existing area of narrowed artery. Once diagnosed clinically, CT or MR angiography may be used to evaluate the cause and extent of disease. Vascular interventional radiologists may use thrombectomy devices or clot dissolving medications to remove or dissolve the clot. Surgical options include open thrombectomy and even vascular bypass.
- Carotid atherosclerosis involves the major branch arteries that provide blood to the brain. Carotid artery disease incurs an increased risk of stroke by two different mechanisms, either from limiting overall blood flow or more often by showering pieces of plaque or clot deep into the small vessels in the brain. Either can result in degrees of cerebral ischemia. Carotid artery disease can be typically addressed with open surgical techniques (carotid endarterectomy) or though endovascular stenting.
- Chronic mesenteric ischemia can produce severe pain with eating and result in food fear and weight loss. These vascular disorders can be repaired by endovascular approaches using angioplasty and stenting.
- Renal arterial ischemia can contribute to hypertension, which can be severe and refractory to medical therapy.
- Coronary artery disease involves the arteries supplying blood to heart muscle. Coronary ischemia results in myocardial infarction, also known as a heart attack. The coronary arteries were one of the earliest widely accepted applications of angioplasty and stenting developed by cardiology and interventional radiology.
- Aortoiliac occlusive disease (Leriche syndrome) is a constellation of symptoms due to significant occlusion of the distal aorta and common iliac arteries, most commonly by atherosclerotic disease The classic symptoms include buttock claudication and erectile dysfunction, with decreased femoral pulses. Additional symptoms of critical limb ischemia can be present. Both surgical and endovascular approaches to revascularization can be considered.

Aneurysm refers to pathologic dilation of an artery to greater than 1.5 times its normal size. True vascular aneurysms are due to degenerative processes in the wall of the artery. Aneurysms can be solitary or multiple and are sometimes found in association with various clinical syndromes, including forms of vasculitis or connective tissue diseases. Aneurysms are typically classified by major shapes, either fusiform (tubular) or saccular (eccentric). Ectasia is another broad term for an enlarged vessel, but is not necessarily pathological. Rupture is a dreaded complication of aneurysms that can lead to extensive, difficult to control bleeding. Aneurysms can also clot, or thrombose, and rapidly occlude the involved vessel, leading to acute distal ischemia.

- Aortic aneurysms include thoracic, abdominal and thoracoabdominal aneurysms. Treatment strategies are customized depending on the location, size, rate of growth and extent of the aneurysm as well as the medical comorbidities of the patient. For example, an intact, small but slowly growing aneurysm may be safely monitored with serial imaging for months or years before elective repair is considered. Elective endovascular aortic grafting is now routinely attempted when possible. Endovascular aortic repair (EVAR) refers to treatment of an abdominal aortic aneurysm, while thoracic endovascular aortic repair (TEVAR) is performed on the thoracic aorta. A ruptured aneurysm may be taken emergently for open, endovascular or combination repair.

A variety of endovascular grafts are available, and each has advantages and disadvantages depending on the characteristics of the aneurysm and patient.

- Peripheral aneurysms occur in the arms and legs. These can typically be evaluated and monitored with vascular ultrasound, CT angiography and MR angiography. Popliteal aneurysms are associated with distal embolization and are also associated with concurrent contralateral popliteal artery aneurysms and abdominal aortic aneurysms. When amenable, endovascular treatments for popliteal aneurysms can include endovascular stenting or surgical bypass.
- Visceral aneurysms affect the vessels that supply the solid organs. Similar to other aneurysms, treatment depends on several factors including size, location, shape and growth. Endovascular treatments for visceral aneurysms can usually be performed with less morbidity when compared to open surgical techniques.
- Intracranial aneurysms arise in the arterial supply of the brain. Endovascular approaches to treatment include stenting and coiling and are preferable in most cases since clipping and resection require a surgical craniotomy. Rupture of intracranial aneurysms can have devastating clinical effects. For further discussion, refer to the neuro-interventional radiology section.
- Pseudoaneurysm is when there is not all three layers surrounding the artery. These structures can technically be considered a type of contained bleed. They are most often due to focal damage to a blood vessel, which could be the result of trauma, infection or inflammation. Splenic artery pseudoaneurysms, for example, may develop as a result of pancreatitis. In some cases, pseudoaneurysms of the femoral and radial arterials can be a complication of arterial access for endovascular procedures. Depending on the size and location of the pseudoaneurysm, it may be treatable with minimally-invasive interventional radiology methods, though some, particularly the infected ones, may require open surgery.

Dissection refers to a tear in the inner layer of the arterial wall. Blood pumps into this defect and dissects its way between the layers in the wall of an artery, creating a false channel separate from the true arterial lumen. Dissections can develop due to trauma, spontaneously due to high blood pressure and native vascular disease, or in some cases as a complication of prior surgical or endovascular treatment.

When an arterial dissection expands, it can restrict normal flow through the affected artery or potentially block the origin of a branch vessel—this can compromise distal perfusion in either case. When acute and symptomatic, this is an emergency that requires prompt treatment.

However, as medical imaging has improved, chronic, asymptomatic dissections have also been discovered, and in some cases these may be safely managed with blood pressure control, follow-up imaging and proper counseling for the warning signs of potential ischemia.

Dissections can occur in any artery and are named for their vessel of origin. Aortic dissections can be further classified and treated depending on whether they involve the thoracic aorta, the abdominal aorta or both. Classic pain related to acute aortic dissections is described as "tearing" or "ripping" and possibly radiating to a patient's back. Acute aortic dissection can be difficult to diagnose but is more common than aortic aneurysm rupture.

Thoracic aortic dissections are further characterized with the Stanford classification. Type A dissections involve the root and ascending aorta. These require prompt treatment, which currently is mostly surgical in nature. Type B dissections begin in the distal aortic arch beyond the left subclavian artery origin, and may often be addressed with pain medication and blood pressure control. If the type B aortic dissection results in poor circulation to the intestines, kidneys or legs it often requires urgent endovascular repair with endografts and/or fenestrations. If a type B aortic dissection has ruptured, or has features that indicate impending rupture, they are urgently repaired too.

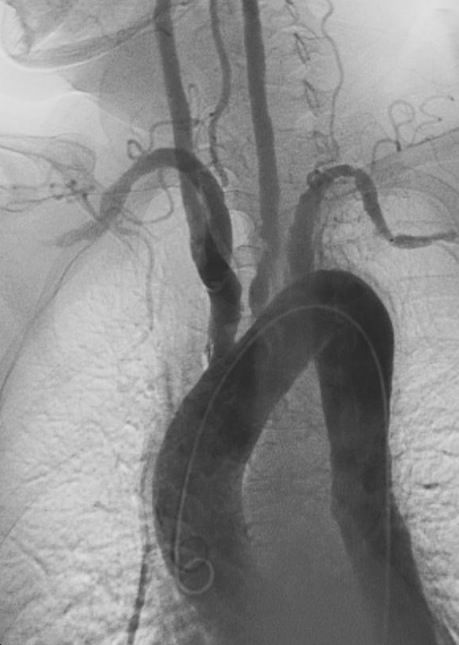
Takayasu arteritis angiography

Dissections can also arise in virtually any other artery. Carotid artery dissection, for example, places patients at increased risk for stroke and may extend further into the blood vessels within the brain. Vertebral artery dissection are less common but also dangerous for similar reasons. Mesenteric artery dissection may limit the blood supply to the intestines. Renal artery dissections can decrease blood flow to the kidneys and contribute to hypertension. Peripheral arterial dissections can be found elsewhere in the arms and legs. These dissections can occur primarily due to focal traumas, underlying vascular disease, or as an extension of a larger, complex aortic dissection that tears further into these smaller branches.

Treatment of dissections depends on several factors, including the location, extent, how long it has been developing (acute or chronic) and whether it is limiting perfusion. Surgical approaches to dissections can include reconstructing the aorta, surgical bypass and surgical fenestration. Like other arterial disorders, endovascular approaches to dissection such as stent-grafting and percutaneous fenestration can be utilized, either primarily or in combination with surgery depending on the complexity of the dissection.

Penetrating aortic ulcer (PAU) is an advanced focal form of atherosclerosis, most often encountered in the aorta. It starts as a small plaque in the inner-most layer of the aorta called the intima, but the inflammatory process ulcerates and penetrates through this layer into the media. While PAU is considered a distinct entity, many think this is a precursor lesion to dissection or aneurysm. Along with intramural hematoma, aneurysm and dissection, PAU is recognized as one of several acute aortic syndromes—a spectrum of related conditions correlated to potential aortic rupture. They thus have a high potential morbidity and mortality, and should at least be followed closely.

Acute or active bleeding can occur throughout the human body due to a variety of causes. Interventional radiologists can address bleeding with embolization, usually with small plastic particles, glues or coils. Traumatic rupture of a blood vessel, for example, may be addressed this way if a patient is at risk of fatal bleeding. This has revolutionized medicine and interventional radiologists commonly treat refractory nose bleeds, excessive coughing of blood, intestinal bleeding, post-pregnancy bleeding, spontaneous intra-abdominal on intra-thoracic bleeding, bleeding related to trauma and post-surgical bleeding. In some instances where severe bleeding is anticipated, such as in complex surgery or the excision of a highly vascular tumor, interventional radiologists may embolize certain target blood vessels prior to the operation to prevent major blood loss.

Transplant organs rely on healthy blood supply to survive. In some instances, the arteries that feed a transplant may narrow, typically where the donor vessel is sewn to the recipient. Interventional radiologists evaluate the blood supply of these patient's and may use balloons or stents to open narrowed vessels and keep the transplant organ functional.

==== Venous disease ====
The veins of the human body are responsible for returning de-oxygenated blood back to the heart. Like a rock rolling down a hill, blood flows from the highest pressure (the blood in the aorta) to the lower venous pressure (the blood in the vena cava as it empties back to the heart.) Unlike arteries, veins are thin walled and distensible, allowing them to accommodate large volumes of blood without significant changes in pressure. In fact, the venous system is so low pressure that veins have valves to keep blood from flowing backward. The motion of the human body helps pump blood through the veins—squeezing leg muscles while walking, for instance, helps push venous blood back up to the heart against the pull of gravity. Unfortunately, without this extra push some blood can sit stagnant in veins, leading to a multitude of clinical problems. The largest vein in the body is the vena cava. The superior vena cava (SVC) drains blood from the top half of the body while the inferior vena cava (IVC) drains blood from below the diaphragm. Elsewhere in the body, veins can be categorized into superficial, primarily associated with the skin and soft tissues, or deep veins, which drain muscles and organs.

==== Venous access ====
Chronic kidney disease (CKD or chronic renal disease) is a condition in which there is a progressive loss of kidney function. It has numerous recognized causes and risk factors. CKD affects approximately 14% of the world population, and over 600,000 people in the United States alone. There are five recognized stages of CKD; the fifth stage is also called end-stage renal disease (ESRD) and invariably requires some form of renal replacement therapy.

Around the turn of the 20th century, breakthroughs in understanding of renal physiology led many to believe that dialysis using artificial kidneys was a potential cure for renal disease. Over 100 years later, the only available curative, renal replacement therapy for CKD is kidney transplantation. However, many patients can live for decades utilizing dialysis.

Dialyzer technology initially outpaced the ability of clinicians to apply it to patients. In the 1920s, the first dialysis catheter was created using thin fragile glass tubes. Early methods required surgical incision to reach large vessels, which carried a large risk of major bleeding. The first somewhat permanent, reliable dialysis access, the Scribner Teflon shunt, was invented nearly 40 years later and allowed a patient with kidney failure to survive 11 more years. As medicine and surgery have grown more sophisticated, more patients now live with chronic renal disease than ever before. The most common type of dialysis in the United States is hemodialysis, which can be performed through several types of vascular access. The arteriovenous fistula (AVF) is the preferred method. Arteriovenous fistula are created surgically by directly connecting an artery and a vein, most commonly in the arm. An arteriovenous graft (AVG) relies on the same principle but bridges the gap between the artery and vein with a medical-grade prosthetic shunt. Over time, altered flow mechanics can result in changes within the involved vessels. Vascular narrowing, thrombosis, aneurysms and pseudoaneurysms are commonly encountered complications over the life of an AVF or AVG. Interventional radiologists can use angiography to evaluate these structures (commonly called a istulogram) and treat dysfunctional access with angioplasty, stenting, and thrombectomy. Most patients require regular evaluation and treatment to keep their access working. When possible, AVFs are preferred to AVGs due to their relatively lower complication rate and longer patency. The Fistula First initiative works to promote physician and patient awareness about the benefits of first attempting hemodialysis through a fistula. There are a few devices (endo AVF) that are being utilized by interventional radiologists to percutaneously create fistulas in a minimally invasive fashion.

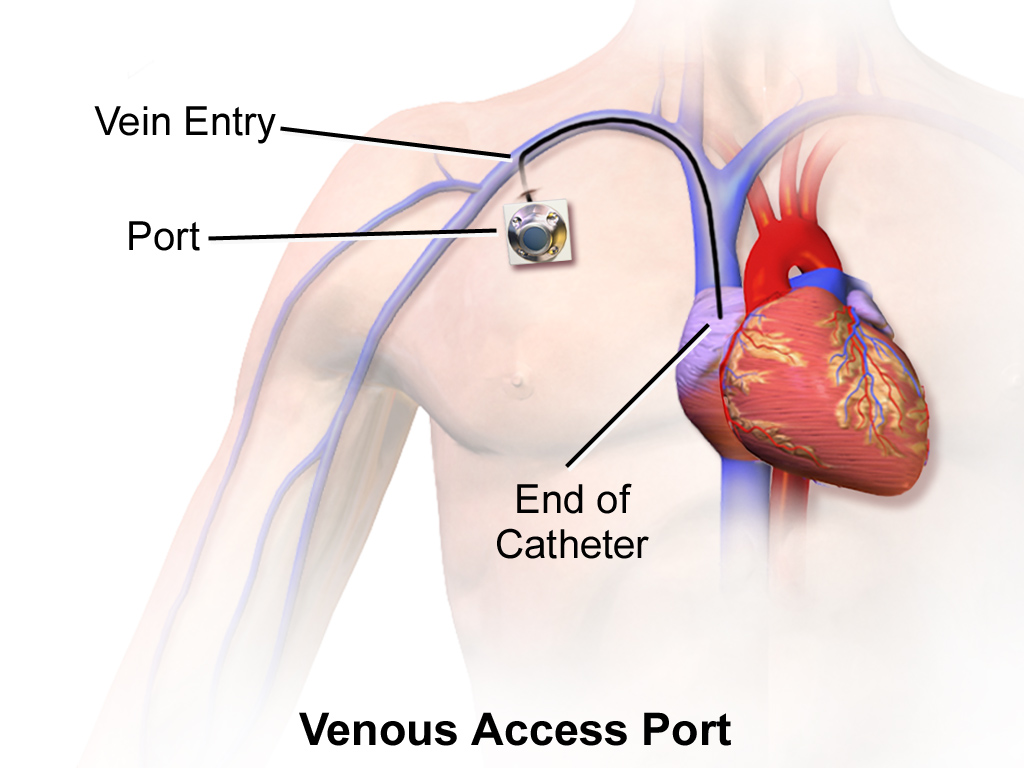
Venous access port catheter

Dialysis catheters include temporary and tunneled large-bore central venous access lines placed for administering hemodialysis. When possible, these catheters are placed in the right internal jugular vein, but the left internal jugular and femoral veins may also be utilized. Temporary dialysis lines may be placed when patients are hospitalized and either too sick or at a high risk of bleeding. Permanent hemodialysis catheters are longer overall but a segment is tunneled through the skin of the chest, which lets the catheter lie flat and lowers the risk of infection.

Central venous access refers to a variety of intravenous catheters placed in patients requiring certain long-term medications. These are much smaller in diameter than dialysis lines, but are larger and longer than a standard intravenous line (IV.) Examples include Hickman catheters, peripherally inserted central cathethers (or PICCs), tunneled small bore central venous catheters, and mediports. These lines differ in where they are inserted but are all placed under imaging guidance and adjusted so the end of the catheter sits in the vena cava adjacent to the heart. These catheters are designed to deliver strong medications, such as chemotherapy or prolonged courses of antibiotics, which are either dosed too frequently to keep placing new IVs or are too irritating to small veins be injected through a standard IV.
