= Irreversible electroporation =

- Other names: Non-thermal irreversible electroporation
- Specialty: Oncology

Irreversible electroporation or IRE is a soft tissue ablation technique using short but strong electrical fields to create permanent and hence lethal nanopores in the cell membrane, to disrupt cellular homeostasis. The resulting cell death results from induced apoptosis or necrosis induced by either membrane disruption or secondary breakdown of the membrane due to transmembrane transfer of electrolytes and adenosine triphosphate. The main use of IRE lies in tumor ablation in regions where precision and conservation of the extracellular matrix, blood flow and nerves are of importance. The first generation of IRE for clinical use, in the form of the NanoKnife System, became commercially available for research purposes in 2009, solely for the surgical ablation of soft tissue tumors. Cancerous tissue ablation via IRE appears to show significant cancer specific immunological responses which are currently being evaluated alone and in combination with cancer immunotherapy.

== History ==
First observations of IRE effects go back to 1754. Nollet reported the first systematic observations of the appearance of red spots on animal and human skin that was exposed to electric sparks. However, its use for modern medicine began in 1982 with the seminal work of Neumann and colleagues. Pulsed electric fields were used to temporarily permeabilize cell membranes to deliver foreign DNA into cells. In the following decade, the combination of high-voltage pulsed electric fields with the chemotherapeutic drug bleomycin and with DNA yielded novel clinical applications: electrochemotherapy and gene electrotransfer, respectively. The use of irreversible electroporation for therapeutic applications was first suggested by Davalos, Mir, and Rubinsky.

== Mechanism ==
Utilizing ultra short pulsed but very strong electrical fields, micropores and nanopores are induced in the phospholipid bilayers which form the outer cell membranes. Two kinds of damage can occur:

1. Reversible electroporation (RE): Temporary and limited pathways for molecular transport via nanopores are formed, but after the end of the electric pulse, the transport ceases and the cells remain viable. Medical applications are, for example, local introduction of intracellular cytotoxic pharmaceuticals such as bleomycin (electroporation and electrochemotherapy).
2. Irreversible electroporation (IRE): After a certain degree of damage to the cell membranes by electroporation, the leakage of intracellular contents is too severe or the resealing of the cellular membrane is too slow, leaving healthy and/or cancerous cells irreversibly damaged. They die by either apoptosis or via cell-internally induced necrotic pathways, which is unique to this ablation technique.

It should be stated that even though the ablation method is generally accepted to be apoptosis, some findings seem to contradict a pure apoptotic cell death, making the exact process by which IRE causes cell death unclear. In any case, all studies agree that the cell death is an induced one with the cells dying over a varying time period of hours to days and does not rely on local extreme heating and melting of tissue via high energy deposition like most ablation technologies (see radiofrequency ablation, microwave ablation, High-intensity focused ultrasound).

When an electrical field of more than 0.5 V/nm is applied to the resting trans-membrane potential, it is proposed that water enters the cell during this dielectric breakdown. Hydrophilic pores are formed. A molecular dynamics simulation by Tarek illustrates this proposed pore formation in two steps:

1. After the application of an electrical field, water molecules line up in single file and penetrate the hydrophobic center of the bilayer lipid membrane.
2. These water channels continue to grow in length and diameter and expand into water-filled pores, at which point they are stabilized by the lipid head groups that move from the membrane-water interface to the middle of the bilayer.

It is proposed that as the applied electrical field increases, the greater is the perturbation of the phospholipid head groups, which in turn increases the number of water filled pores. This entire process can occur within a few nanoseconds. Average sizes of nanopores are likely cell-type specific. In swine livers, they average around 340-360 nm, as found using SEM.

A secondary described mode of cell death was described to be from a breakdown of the membrane due to transmembrane transfer of electrolytes and adenosine triphosphate. Other effects like heat or electrolysis were also shown to play a role in the currently clinically applied IRE pulse protocols.

== Potential advantages and disadvantages ==
=== Advantages of IRE ===
1. Tissue selectivity - conservation of vital structures within the treatment field. Its capability of preserving vital structures within the IRE-ablated zone. In all IRE ablated liver tissues, critical structures, such as the hepatic arteries, hepatic veins, portal veins and intrahepatic bile ducts were all preserved. As IRE targets the bilipid membranes of cells, structures mainly consisting of proteins like vascular elastic and collagenous structures, as well as peri-cellular matrix proteins are not affected by the currents. Vital and scaffolding structures (like large blood vessels, urethra or intrahepatic bile ducts) are conserved. The electrically insulating myelin layer, surrounding nerve fibers, protects nerve bundles from the IRE effects to a certain degree. Up to what point nerves stay unaffected or can regenerate is not completely understood.
2. Sharp ablation zone margins- The transition zone between reversible electroporated area and irreversible electroporated area is accepted to be only a few cell layers. Whereas, the transition areas as in radiation or thermal based ablation techniques are non-existent. Further, the absence of the heat sink effect, which is a cause of many problems and treatment failures, is advantageous and increases the predictability of the treatment field. Geometrically, rather complex treatment fields are enabled by the multi-electrode concept.
3. Absence of thermally induced necrosis - The short pulse lengths relative to the time between the pulses prevents joule heating of the tissue. Hence, by design, no necrotic cell damage is to be expected (except possibly in very close proximity to the needle). Therefore, IRE has none of the typical short and long term side-effects associated with necrosis.
4. Short treatment time - A typical treatment takes less than 5 minutes. This does not include the possibly complicated electrode placement which might require the use of many electrode and re-position of the electrodes during the procedure.
5. Real time monitoring - The treatment volume can be to a certain degree be visualized, both during and after the treatment. Possible visualization methods are ultrasound, MRI, and CT.
6. Immunological response - IRE appears to provoke a stronger immunological response than other ablation methods which is currently being studied for use in conjunction with cancer immunotheraputic approaches.

=== Disadvantages of IRE ===
1. Strong muscle contractions - The strong electric fields created by IRE, due to direct stimulation of the neuromuscular junction, cause strong muscle contractions requiring special anesthesia and total body paralysis.
2. Incomplete ablation within targeted tumors - The originally threshold for IRE of cells was approximately 600 V/cm with 8 pulses, a pulse duration of 100 μs, and a frequency of 10 Hz. Qin et al. later discovered that even at 1,300 V/cm with 99 pulses, a pulse duration of 100 μs, and 10 Hz, there were still islands of viable tumor cells within ablated regions. This suggests that tumor tissue may respond differently to IRE than healthy parenchyma. The mechanism of cell death following IRE relies on cellular apoptosis, which results from pore formation in the cellular membrane. Tumor cells, known to be resistant to apoptotic pathways, may require higher thresholds of energy to be adequately treated. However, the recurrence rated found in clinical studies suggest a rather low recurrence rate and often superior overall survival when compared with other ablation modalities.
3. Local environment - The electric fields of IRE are strongly influenced by the conductivity of the local environment. The presence of metal, for example with biliary stents, can result in variances in energy deposition. Various organs, such as the kidneys, are also subject to irregular ablation zones, due to the increased conductivity of urine.

== Use in medical practice ==
A number of electrodes, in the form of long needles, are placed around the target volume. The point of penetration for the electrodes is chosen according to anatomical conditions. Imaging is essential to the placement and can be achieved by ultrasound, magnetic resonance imaging or tomography. The needles are then connected to the IRE-generator, which then proceeds to sequentially build up a potential difference between two electrodes. The geometry of the IRE-treatment field is calculated in real time and can be influenced by the user. Depending on the treatment-field and number of electrodes used, the ablation takes between 1 and 10 minutes. In general muscle relaxants are administered, since even under general anesthetics, strong muscle contractions are induced by excitation of the motor end-plate.

Typical parameters (1st generation IRE system):

- Number of pulses per treatment: 90
- Pulse length: 100 μs
- Intermission between pulses: 100 to 1000 ms
- Field strength: 1500 volt/cm
- Current: ca. 50 A (tissue- and geometry dependent)
- Max ablation volume using two electrodes: 4 × 3 × 2 cm³

The shortly pulsed, strong electrical fields are induced through thin, sterile, disposable electrodes. The potential differences are calculated and applied by a computer system between these electrodes in accordance to a previously planned treatment field.

One specific device for the IRE procedure is the NanoKnife system manufactured by AngioDynamics, which received FDA 510k clearance on October 24, 2011. The NanoKnife system has also received an Investigational Device Exemption (IDE) from the FDA that allows AngioDynamics to conduct clinical trials using this device. The Nanoknife system transmits a low-energy direct current from a generator to electrode probes placed in the target tissues for the surgical ablation of soft tissue. In 2011, AngioDynamics received an FDA warning letter for promoting the device for indications for which it had not received approval.

In 2013, the UK National Institute for Health and Clinical Excellence issued a guidance that the safety and efficacy of the use of irreversible electroporation of the treatment of various types of cancer has not yet been established.

Newer generations of Electroporation-based ablation systems are being developed specifically to address the shortcomings of the first generation of IRE but, as of June 2020, none of the technologies are available as a medical device.

== Clinical data ==
Potential organ systems, where IRE might have a significant impact due to its properties include the pancreas, liver, prostate and the kidneys, which were the main focus of the studies listed in Table 1-3 (state: June 2020).

None of the potential organ systems, which may be treated for various conditions and tumors, are covered by randomized multicenter trials or long-term follow-ups (state. June 2020).

=== Liver ===
Table 1: Irreversible Electroporation Clinical Data in the Liver
Author, Year	No. of Patients / Lesions	Tumor Type and median size	Approach	Median follow-up (mo)	Primary efficacy (%)	Secondary efficacy (%)
Frühling et al. 2023	149 / 149	CRLM (n = 87), HCC (n = 62)	NA	58	Mean Overall Survival : 27.0 months (95% CI 22.2–31.8 months), and 35.0 months (95% CI 13.8–56.2 months),	NS
Bhutiani et al., 2016	30 / 30	HCC (n = 30), 3.0 cm	Open (n = 10), laparoscopic (n = 20)	6	97	NS
Cannon et al., 2013	44 / 48	HCC (n = 14), CRLM (n = 20), Other (n = 10); 2.5 cm	Percutaneous (n = 28), open (n = 14), laparoscopic (n = 2)	12	59.5	NS
Frühling et al., 2017	30 / 38	HCC (n = 8), CRLM (n = 23), other (n = 7); 2.4 cm	Percutaneous (n = 30)	22,3	65.8 (at 6 months)	NS
Hosein et al., 2014	28 / 58	CRLM (n = 58), 2.7 cm	Percutaneous (n = 28)	10,7	97	NS
Kingham et al., 2012	28 / 65	HCC (n = 2), CRLM (n = 21), other (n = 5); 1.0 cm	Percutaneous (n = 6), open (n = 22)	6	93.8	NS
Narayanan et al., 2014	67 / 100	HCC (n = 35), CRLM (n = 20), CCC (n = 5); 2.7 cm	Percutaneous (n = 67)	10,3	NS	NS
Niessen et al., 2015	25 / 59	HCC (n = 22), CRLM (n = 16), CCC (n = 6), other (n = 4); 1.7 cm	Percutaneous (n = 25)	6	70.8	NS
Niessen et al., 2016	34 / 59	HCC (n = 33), CRLM (n = 22), CCC (n = 5), other (n = 5); 2.4 cm	Percutaneous (n = 34)	13,9	74.8	NS
Niessen et al., 2017	71 / 64	HCC (n = 31), CRLM (n = 16), CCC (n = 6), other (n = 4); 2.3 cm	Percutaneous (n = 71)	35,7	68.3	NS
Philips et al., 2013	60 / 62	HCC (n = 13), CRLM (n = 23), CCC (n = 2), other (n = 22); 3.8 cm	Percutaneous (NS) open (NS)	18	NS	NS
Scheffer et al., 2014	10 / 10	CRLM (n = 10), 2.4 cm	Open (n = 10)	0	88.9	NS
Thomson et al., 2011	25 / 63	HCC (n = 17), CRLM (n = 15), other (n = 31); 2.5 cm	Percutaneous (n = 25)	3	51.6	56.5

Hepatic IRE appears to be safe, even when performed near vessels and bile ducts with an overall complication rate of 16%, with most complications being needle related (pneumothorax and hemorrhage).The COLDFIRE-2 trial with 50 patients showed 76% local tumor progression-free survival after 1 year. Whilst there are no studies comparing IRE to other ablative therapies yet, thermal ablations have shown a higher efficacy in that matter with around 96% progression free survival. Therefor Bart et al. concluded that IRE should currently only be performed for only truly unresectable and non-ablatable tumors.

=== Pancreas ===
Table 2: Irreversible Electroporation Clinical Data in the Pancreas
Author, Year	No. of Patients	Stage of Disease and Median Largest Tumor Diameter	Approach	Median Follow-up (mo)	Median Overall Survival (mo)	Local Recurrence (%)	Tumor Downstaging Caused by IRE
Belfiore et al., 2017	29	LAPC, NS	Percutaneous	29	14.0	3	3 patients
Flak et al., 2019	33	LAPC, 3.0 cm (88% after chemotherapy or radiation therapy)	Percutaneous (n = 32), open (n = 1)	9	18.5 (diagnosis), 10.7 (IRE)	NS	3 patients
Kluger et al., 2016	50	LAPC T4, 3.0 cm	Open	8,7	12.0 (IRE)	11	NS
Lambert et al., 2016	21	LAPC, 3.9 cm	Open (n = 19), percutaneous (n = 2)	NS	10.2	NS	NS
Leen et al., 2018	75	LAPC, 3.5 cm (after chemotherapy)	Percutaneous	11.7	27.0 (IRE)	38	3 patients
Månsson et al., 2016	24	LAPC, NS (after chemotherapy)	Percutaneous	NS	17.9 (diagnosis), 7.0 (IRE)	58	2 patients
Månsson et al., 2019	24	LAPC, 3.0 cm (before chemotherapy)	Percutaneous	NS	13.3 (diagnosis)	33	0
Martin et al., 2015	150	LAPC, 2.8 cm (after chemo- or radiation therapy)	Open	29	23.2 (diagnosis), 18 (IRE)	2	NS
Narayanan et al., 2016	50	LAPC, 3.2 cm 6 1.3 (after chemo- or radiation therapy)	Percutaneous	NS	27 (diagnosis), 14.2 (IRE)	NS	3 patients
Paiella et al., 2015	10	LAPC, 3.0 cm	Open	7.6	15.3 (diagnosis), 6.4 (IRE)	NS	NS
Ruarus et al., 2019	50	LAPC (n = 40) and local recurrence (n = 10), 4.0 cm (68% after chemotherapy)	Percutaneous	NS	17.0 (diagnosis), 9.6 (IRE)	46	0 patients
Scheffer et al., 2017	25	LAPC, 4.0 cm (52% after chemotherapy)	Percutaneous	12 (7–16)	17.0 (diagnosis), 11.0 (IRE)	NS	NS
Sugimoto et al., 2018	8	LAPC, 2.9 cm	Open or percutaneous, NS	17.5	17.5 (diagnosis)	38	0 patients
Vogel et al., 2017	15	LAPC, NS	Open	24	16 (diagnosis)	NS	NS
Yan et al., 2016	25	LAPC, 4.2 cm	Open	3	NS	2	NS
Zhang et al., 2017	21	LAPC, 3.0 cm	Percutaneous	1	NS	NS	NS

Animal studies have shown the safety and efficacy of IRE on pancreatic tissue. The overall survival rates in studies on the use of IRE for pancreatic cancer provide an encouraging nonvariable endpoint and show an additive beneficial effect of IRE compared with standard-of care chemotherapeutic treatment with FOLFIRINOX (a combination of 5-fluorouracil, leucovorin, irinotecan, and oxaliplatin) (median OS, 12–14months). However, IRE appears to be more effective in conjunction with systemic therapy and is not suggested as first-line treatment. Despite that IRE makes adjuvant tumor mass reduction therapy for LAPC possible, IRE remains, in its current state, a high risk procedure requiring additional safety data before it can be used widely.

=== Prostate ===
Table 3: Irreversible Electroporation Clinical Data in the Prostate
Author, Year	No. of Patients	Gleason Score	Pretreatment or Concurrent Treatment	Adverse events, 1/2/3/4/5	Functional Outcome (% of patients)	Oncologic Efficacy (no. of patients)	Comments
Onik and Rubinsky (2010)	16	3+3: n = 7 3+4: n = 6 4+4: n = 3	NS	NR	At 6 months: urinary incontinence 0% erectile dysfunction 0%	Local recurrence, n = 0; out-of-field occurrence, n = 1	Adequate flow in NVB postoperative
Van den Bos et al. (2016)	16	3+3: n = 8 4+3: n = 3 4+4: n = 2	Radical prostatectomy 4 weeks after IRE	15/8/1/0/0	NS	15 patients showed complete fibrosis or necrosis of ablation zone	Electrode configuration completely enveloped ablation, leaving no viable cells in 15 patients
Van den Bos et al. (2018)	63	3+3: n = 9 3+4: n = 38 4+3: n = 16	Concurrent TURP (n = 10)	Grade 1: 24% Grade 2: 11% Grade 3–5: 0%	At 12 months: urinary incontinence 0%; erectile dysfunction 23%	Local recurrence, n = 7; out-of-field recurrence, n = 4	Safe and effective
Guenther et al. (2019)	429/471	3+3: n = 82 3+4/4+3: n = 225 4+4: n = 68 5+3/3+5: n = 3 >4+4 = 42	Pretreated with: radical prostatectomy (n = 21), radiation therapy (n = 28), TURP (n = 17), HIFU (n = 8) ADT (n = 29)	93/17/7/0/0	At >=12 months: urinary incontinence 0%; erectile dysfunction 3%	after up to 6y: local recurrence, n = 20; out-of-field recurrence, n = 27	Comparable 5-year Recurrence Free Survival to radical prostatectomy with improved urogenital outcomes
Valerio et al. (2014)	34	3+3: n = 9 3+4: n = 19 4+3: n = 5 4+4: n = 1	NS	12/10/0/0/0	At 6 months: urinary incontinence 0%; erectile dysfunction 5%	Local residual disease, n = 6; only one histologic verification. Out-of-field recurrence, NS	Average ablation volume of 12mL
Ting et al. (2016)	25	3+3: n = 2 3+4: n = 15 4+3: n = 8 4+4: n = 0	None	Grade 1: 35% Grade 2: 29% Grade 3–5: 0%	At 6 months: urinary incontinence 0%; erectile dysfunction, unknown	Local recurrence, n = 0; out-of-fieldrecurrence, n = 5 (with histologic verification)	Good oncological control achieved with low toxicity
Blazevski et al. (2020)	50	3+3: n = 5 3+4: n = 37 4+3: n = 6 4+4: n = 2	NS	Grade 1: 10 Grade 2: 9 Grade 3–5: 0%	incontinence 2% (study only focused apical lesions); erectile dysfunction 6%	Local recurrence, n=1 out-of-field recurrence, NS	Study only focused on apical lesions (difficult to treat with other methods without causing impotence and incontinence). Focal ablation using IRE for PCa in the distal apex appears safe and feasible.

The concept of treating prostate cancer with IRE was first proposed by Gary Onik and Boris Rubinsky in 2007. Prostate carcinomas are frequently located near sensitive structures which might be permanently damaged by thermal treatments or radiation therapy. The applicability of surgical methods is often limited by accessibility and precision. Surgery is also associated with a long healing time and high rate of side effects. Using IRE, the urethra, bladder, rectum and neurovascular bundle and lower urinary sphincter can potentially be included in the treatment field without creating (permanent) damage.

IRE has been in use against prostate cancer since 2011, partly in form of clinical trials, compassionate care or individualized treatment approach. As for all other ablation technologies and also most conventional methods, no studies employed a randomized multi-center approach or targeted cancer-specific mortality as endpoint. Cancer-specific mortality or overall survival are notoriously hard to assess for prostate cancer, as the trials require more than a decade and usually several treatment types are performed during the years making treatment-specific survival advantages difficult to quantify. Therefore, the results of ablation-based treatments and focal treatments in general usually use local recurrences and functional outcome (quality of life) as endpoint. In that regard, the clinical results collected so far and listed in Table 3 shown encouraging results and uniformly state IRE as a safe and effective treatment (at least for focal ablation) but all warrant further studies. The largest cohort presented by Guenther et al. with up to 6-year follow-up is limited as a heterogeneous retrospective analysis and no prospective clinical trial. Therefore, despite that several hospitals in Europe have been employing the method for many years with one private clinic even listing more than one thousand treatments as of June 2020, IRE for prostate cancer is currently not recommended in treatment guidelines.

=== Kidney ===
While nephron-sparing surgery is the gold standard treatment for small, malignant renal masses, ablative therapies are considered a viable option in patients who are poor surgical candidates. Radiofrequency ablation (RFA) and cryoablation have been used since the 1990s; however, in lesions larger than 3 cm, their efficacy is limited. The newer ablation modalities, such as IRE, microwave ablation (MWA), and high-intensity focused ultrasound, may help overcome the challenges in tumor size.

The first human studies have proven the safety of IRE for the ablation of renal masses; however, the effectiveness of IRE through histopathological examination of an ablated renal tumor in humans is yet to be known. Wagstaff et al. have set out to investigate the safety and effectiveness of IRE ablation of renal masses and to evaluate the efficacy of ablation using MRI and contrast-enhanced ultrasound imaging. In accordance with the prospective protocol designed by the authors, the treated patients will subsequently undergo radical nephrectomy to assess IRE ablation success.

Later phase 2 prospective trials showed good results in terms of safety and feasibility for small renal masses but the cohort was limited in numbers (7 and 10 patients respectively), hence efficacy is not yet sufficiently determined. IRE appears safe for small renal masses up to 4 cm. However, the consensus is that current evidence is still inadequate in quality and quantity.

=== Lung ===
In a prospective, single-arm, multi-center, phase II clinical trial, the safety and efficacy of IRE on lung cancers were evaluated. The trial included patients with primary and secondary lung malignancies and preserved lung function. The expected effectiveness was not met at interim analysis and the trial was stopped prematurely. Complications included pneumothoraces (11 of 23 patients), alveolar hemorrhage not resulting in significant hemoptysis, and needle tract seeding was found in 3 cases (13%). Disease progression was seen in 14 of 23 patients (61%). Stable disease was found in 1 (4%), partial remission in 1 (4%) and complete remission in 7 (30%) patients. The authors concluded that IRE is not effective for the treatment of lung malignancies. Similarly poor treatment outcomes have been observed in other studies.

A major obstacle of IRE in the lung is the difficulty in positioning the electrodes; placing the probes in parallel alignment is made challenging by the interposition of ribs. Additionally, the planned and actual ablation zones in the lung are dramatically different due to the differences in conductivity between tumor, lung parenchyma, and air.

=== Coronary arteries ===
Maor et el have demonstrated the safety and efficiency of IRE as an ablation modality for smooth muscle cells in the walls of large vessels in rat model. Therefore, IRE has been suggested as preventive treatment for coronary artery re-stenosis after percutaneous coronary intervention.

=== Cardiac ablation therapy ===
Numerous studies in animals have demonstrated the safety and efficiency of IRE as a non-thermal ablation modality for pulmonary veins in the context of atrial fibrillation treatment. In 2023, irreversible electroporation is being widely used and evaluated in humans, as cardiac ablation therapy to kill very small areas of heart muscle. This is done to treat irregularities of heart rhythm. A cardiac catheter delivers trains of high-voltage ultra-rapid electrical pulses that form irreversible pores in cell membranes, resulting in cell death. It is thought to allow better selectivity than the previous techniques, which used heat or cold to kill larger volumes of muscle.

=== Other organs ===
IRE has also been investigated in ex-vivo human eye models for treatment of uveal melanoma and in thyroid cancer.

Successful ablations in animal tumor models have been conducted for lung, brain, heart, skin, bone, head and neck cancer, and blood vessels.
