= Microwave ablation =

- Other names: MWA
- Specialty: Interventional radiology, oncology

Microwave ablation is a form of thermal ablation used in interventional radiology to treat cancer. MWA uses electromagnetic waves in the microwave energy spectrum (300 MHz to 300 GHz) to produce tissue-heating effects. The oscillation of polar molecules produces frictional heating, ultimately generating tissue necrosis within solid tumors. It is generally used for the treatment and/or palliation of solid tumors in patients who are nonsurgical candidate.

== Medical uses ==
For isolated, nonmetastatic lung tumors, surgical resection remains the reference standard for treatment. However, many patients are precluded from surgery due to poor cardiopulmonary function, advanced age, or extensive disease burden. For these patients, minimally invasive therapeutic options such as radiofrequency ablation, microwave ablation, and cryoablation have emerged as possible alternatives.

Tumor ablation of thoracic malignancies should be considered a viable treatment option for patients with early stage, primary or secondary lung cancers who are not surgical candidates or for patients in whom palliation of tumor related symptoms is the intent. MWA is regarded as a particularly efficient option for the treatment of lung tumors since unlike RFA it does not rely on impedance to generate heat, rather electromagnetic microwave waves heat matter by agitating water molecules in the surrounding tissue, producing friction and heat.

Another common use for microwave ablation is the treatment of liver tumors. For nonsurgical patients, local thermal ablation techniques have enabled local control of tumors without resection. In particular, this therapy has grown in use for patients with hepatocellular carcinoma, since many patients present with advanced disease or compromised liver function.

Clinical applications of MWA have also included treatment of renal, adrenal, and bone malignancies. The goals of ablation of thoracic malignancies include: 1. Ablating the entire tumor and a margin of normal parenchyma surrounding it 2. Avoiding injury to critical structures 3. Creating a large ablation area quickly.

== Adverse effects ==
The most common adverse effects of MWA for lung tumors include pain, fever, pneumothorax, and pleural effusions.^{[6-12]} Rib fractures, following thermal ablation, particularly MWA, have been newly noted in the literature.^{[13]}

One of the limitations of thermal-based ablation therapies, including MWA, is the risk of marginal recurrences and/or residual disease. Residual or recurrent tumor is particularly likely in areas adjacent to heat sinks, such as larger blood vessels or airways. Theoretically, the greater heat intensity generated in MWA compared to other thermal modalities should allow for more complete ablations in larger tumors and thus decreased incidence of residual disease or recurrence at the tumor margins.^{[3]}

== Procedure ==
MWA allows for flexible treatment approaches, including percutaneous, laparoscopic, and open surgical access. Therapy is generally performed with the patient under conscious sedation; however, in cases where intra-procedural pain is problematic a general anesthetic may be used. Ablations can be performed using a single MW antenna or a cluster of three to achieve a greater ablation volume.^{[4]} Tumor temperatures during ablation can be measured with a separate thermal couple; tumors are treated to over 60 °C to achieve coagulation necrosis.

=== Platforms ===
Currently, there are six MWA systems commercially available in the United States. The systems use either a 915 MHz generator (Evident, Covidien, Mansfield, MA; MicrothermX, BSD Medical, Salt Lake City, UT; Avecure, Medwaves, San Diego, CA) or a 2450 MHz generator (Certus 140, Neuwave, Madison, WI; Amica, Hospital Service, Rome, Italy; Acculis MTA, AngioDynamics, Latham, NY). The MW antennas used are straight applicators with active tips ranging in lengths from 0.6 to 4.0 cm. Five of the six available systems require that the antennas are internally cooled with either room-temperature fluid or carbon dioxide to reduce conductive heating and to prevent possible skin damage.^{[5]}

== History ==
The technique for thermal ablation in the lung by using radiofrequency ablation was first described in 1995 for use in animal lung tumor models and then in 2000 in humans.^{[1-2]} Microwave ablation has emerged as a newer ablation modality and an addition to the arsenal of minimally invasive cancer care.

The purported benefits of microwave ablation over other heat-based modalities such as radiofrequency ablation and laser include a larger and faster volume of tissue heating with a given application. Unlike radiofrequency ablation, MWA does not rely on an electrical circuit allowing for multiple applicators to be used simultaneously.^{[3]}
