= Portal vein embolization =

Preoperative procedure

- Specialty: Interventional radiology

Portal vein embolization (PVE) is a preoperative procedure performed in interventional radiology to initiate hypertrophy of the anticipated future liver remnant a couple weeks prior to a major liver resection procedure. The procedure involves injecting the right or left portal vein with embolic material to occlude portal blood flow. By occluding the blood flow to areas of the liver that will be resected away, the blood is diverted to healthy parts of the liver and induces hyperplasia. This may allow for a more extensive resection or stage bilateral resections that would otherwise be contraindicated resulting in better oncological treatment outcomes.

== Medical uses ==
Indications for PVE depend on the ratio of future liver remnant (FLR) to total estimated liver volume (TELV) and liver condition. Although there is no consensus to the absolute minimum liver volume required for adequate post-resection liver function, a FLR/TELV ratio of at least 25% is recommended in patients with otherwise normal livers. The recommendation for those with chronic liver disease such as cirrhosis is a FLR/TELV ratio of at least 40%. In these patients a PVE may be indicated to increase the FLR and the FLR/TELV ratio. Preoperative patients receiving extensive chemotherapy with a FLR/TELV less than 30% should also receive PVE prior to resection; conversely, chemotherapy does not preclude subsequent PVE.

Other important considerations before a PVE include co-morbidities such as diabetes, procedure type and the extent of planned resection. Insulin resistance has been associated with slower rates of regeneration and higher likelihood of inadequate FLR growth after PVE. Additionally, if the resection requires more extensive surgery such as a resections of the pancreas or small bowel, a greater FLR/TELV ratio may be needed for safe recovery.

=== Outcomes ===
Preoperative PVE is a very well tolerated procedure with extremely low mortality rates (0.1 percent) and technical failure rates (0.4 percent). Complication rates from the procedure are low as well (2–3 percent) and include portal vein thrombosis, liver infarction, necrosis, infection, pneumothorax, and other risks as listed above. Success of PVE is determined by degree of regenerative response, which again depends on factors such as baseline liver condition, technical approach and pre-existing co-morbidities. Five-year survival in patients with originally unresectable tumors as a result of inadequate future liver remnant and received PVE with subsequent resection was found in one study to be 29%.

Originally, there was concern that PVE could promote tumor growth and increase recurrence rates, however a systematic review has found that there was no significant difference observed in postoperative hepatic recurrence or 3 and 5 year overall survival rates. This suggests that PVE does not have any significant adverse effects on the risk of oncogenesis. Overall, PVE is an important technique that can allow for patients with inadequate predicted FLR/TELV ratios an opportunity for resection and potential cure of their liver conditions.

== Contraindications ==
Portal hypertension is an absolute contraindication, as these patients are not surgical candidates and are at higher risk of significant complications from PVE. Additionally, complete lobar portal vein occlusion of either lobe would preclude expected increases in FLR from PVE due to already existing diversion of portal flow. Patients with extrahepatic metastatic disease are also not candidates for resection, and therefore PVE is contraindicated. In the past patients with bi-lobar disease were not considered for PVE, however now there may be a role of PVE in combination with a two-stage hepatectomy. Additionally, patients who have an inadequate predicted FLR post PVE should not be considered. Other contraindications include any conditions that make a patient unfit for surgery or intervention (poor cardiopulmonary status, sepsis, kidney failure, etc.).

== Risks and Benefits ==
PVE has been shown to have the following risks:

1. Portal vein thrombosis, liver infarction, necrosis and portal hypertension.
2. Risks related to any percutaneous transhepatic procedures such as bleeding and infection.
3. Accelerated tumor growth due to compensatory hepatic arterial flow and in cases when all of the tumor-bearing areas are not properly embolized.

PVE has been shown to have the following benefits:

1. Decrease post-resection morbidity by decreasing number of complication and length of hospital stay.
2. Patients initially with unresectable tumors due to inadequate FLR/TELV are able to have resections.
3. Decrease post-resection mortality by increasing the volume of functional liver parenchyma.
4. Poor regenerative response to PVE predicts poor compensatory regeneration following liver resection and can help identify patients unsuitable for resection.

== Mechanism ==
Portal vein embolization is a preoperative procedure performed in interventional radiology to initiate hypertrophy of the anticipated future liver remnant a couple weeks prior to a major liver resection procedure. Future liver remnant (FLR) is defined as the predicted volume of functional liver after resection. There are specific FLR thresholds depending on the status of the liver (otherwise normal, chronic hepatitis, cirrhosis, etc.) that are required for safe liver resection. When the predicted FLR is below threshold, portal vein embolization may increase the FLR and bring it to threshold. The majority of preoperative PVEs usually target the right portal vein in preparation of a major right-sided resection. Though rare, the left portal vein may be embolized prior to a left-sided resection.

The increase in FLR is a result of cellular hyperplasia and not cellular hypertrophy. This means that it is an increase in the number of hepatocytes that accounts for the growth rather than the increase in size of existing hepatocytes. The liver is unique in that it is an organ with regenerative potential. When blood flow to one section of the liver is occluded in PVE, the flow is diverted to other areas and this increase in blood flow stimulates the regenerative response. Regeneration begins within hours of occlusion and factors important to this response include hepatocyte growth factor, epidermal growth factor, insulin, IL-6 and TNF-alpha, among others. The expected increase in FLR is approximately 10 percent; greater increases after four to six weeks can be observed, albeit at a lower rate of growth. An increase in FLR of greater than five percent for a normal liver and 10 percent for a cirrhotic liver is considered adequate and is associated with a reduced risk of post-resection liver failure.

== Method ==
PVE was originally performed using an open approach, but the majority is now done percutaneously under conscious sedation and local anesthesia by an interventional radiologist. This can be done using either a transjugular or transhepatic approach. The most commonly used method is the direct transhepatic puncture of the portal vein. Several different embolization agents can be used and the choice of agents often depend on the expertise of the physician, availability and cost. As the agents differ in size, occlusive properties and side effect profiles, the choice of agent will also depend on the anatomy and locations of the tumors in a specific case. Some commonly used agents include cyanoacrylate, sodium tetradecyl sulfate foam, gelatin, metallic spherical particles, coils and absolute alcohol.

== Liver volumetry ==
To determinate whether there is a need for PVE the FLR needs to be measured. There are various imaging methods used in order to measure the liver volume such as contrast-enhanced computed tomography (CT) or magnetic resonance imaging (MRI) and the FLR can be traced either manually or using automatic or semi-automatic segmentation tools. FLR is measured with the chosen imaging method before PVE and then again 1–4 weeks after PVE calculating the hypertrophy of the FLR.

== Future directions ==
=== Transarterial PVE ===
A technique tested so far in pigs in which a 3:1 mixture of iodinated oil and absolute ethanol was infused via lobar hepatic artery branches and into the portal system via the peribiliary plexus. The degree of FLR hypertrophy seen in the pigs with transarterial PVE compared to traditional percutaneous PVE were found to be nearly double. No significant adverse events were noted. The advantage to this new approach is a better safety profile (does not require direct hepatic puncture). However, this approach may be limited by the amount of embolic agent needed for successful embolization, as the amount needed for humans may exceed the threshold for pulmonary complications.

=== Reversible PVE ===
There are times when a patient who has undergone a PVE is no longer able to undergo a resection. In these instances, the patients are left with a permanently occluded portal vein that can exclude them from receiving other therapies. Therefore, PVE with absorbable materials such as powdered gelatin sponge dissolved in a 4:1 mixture of iodinated contrast medium and saline has been used and shown induce FLR hypertrophy. However, whether it can provide the comparable response to traditional PVE must still be studied. In the future, reversible PVE may also play a role in treating patients with chronic hepatic insufficiency to increase functional liver tissue, as opposed to just being used as an adjuvant therapy for liver resection.

=== PVE with adjuvant stem cell transplantation ===
Studies have shown that bone marrow-derived stem cells (specifically CD133+) play a role in liver regeneration. A study done by Esch, et al. showed that patients who received stem cells in addition to PVE had significant increases in both absolute and relative FLR growth than in patients who received PVE only. They found no significant differences between the groups in regards to major complications and mortality. This suggests that adjuvant stem cell transplantation can increase the efficacy of PVE without increasing risk.
