= Cryoablation =

Process using extreme cold to destroy tissue

- Animated GIF showing cryoablation of mass in right liver lobe using two probes. Time elapsed is approximately 30 minutes.
- ICD-9-CM: 37.33, 37.34, 60.62
- MeSH: D003452

Cryoablation is a process that uses extreme cold to destroy tissue. Cryoablation is performed using hollow needles (cryoprobes) through which cooled, thermally conductive fluids are circulated. Cryoprobes are positioned adjacent to the target in such a way that the freezing process will destroy the diseased tissue. Once the probes are in place, the attached cryogenic freezing unit removes heat from ("cools") the tip of the probe and by extension from the surrounding tissues.

Ablation occurs in tissue that has been frozen by at least three mechanisms:

1. formation of ice crystals within cells thereby disrupting membranes, and interrupting cellular metabolism among other processes;
2. coagulation of blood thereby interrupting bloodflow to the tissue in turn causing ischemia and cell death; and
3. induction of apoptosis, the so-called programmed cell death cascade.

The most common application of cryoablation is to ablate solid tumors found in the lung, liver, breast, kidney and prostate. The use in prostate and renal cryoablation are the most common. Although sometimes applied in cryosurgery through laparoscopic or open surgical approaches, most often cryoablation is performed percutaneously (through the skin and into the target tissue containing the tumor) by a medical specialist, such as an interventional radiologist. The term is from cryo- + ablation.

This offers distinct advantages and disadvantages when compared to other pain management modalities. Unlike chemical neurolysis (e.g., alcohol or phenol), cryoanalgesia is non-neurolytic and maintains the nerve's architectural integrity, facilitating regeneration and reducing the risk of deafferentation pain. Compared to radiofrequency ablation (RFA), cryoanalgesia often results in a less painful procedure and a lower incidence of neuroma formation. However, RFA may offer longer-lasting pain relief in some cases. Traditional local anesthetic nerve blocks provide immediate but short-lived relief, whereas cryoanalgesia provides extended pain control without permanent nerve destruction

The equipment for cryoanalgesia typically consists of a cryoanalgesia unit (console) and specialized cryoprobes. The console regulates the flow of a cryogen (e.g., nitrous oxide or carbon dioxide gas) to the tip of the cryoprobe. Cryoprobes vary in size and design, featuring a small, insulated shaft and a uninsulated tip that forms an ice ball upon activation. Different probe sizes are chosen based on the target nerve's diameter and location.

Cryoanalgesia is indicated for a wide range of chronic pain conditions where a temporary but prolonged nerve block is desired. Common indications include post-thoracotomy pain syndrome, intercostal neuralgia, trigeminal neuralgia (peripheral branches), occipital neuralgia, neuropathic pain following surgery or trauma, phantom limb pain, and pain associated with spasticity. It is also used for managing acute pain in certain surgical procedures, such as rib fractures or sternotomy.

== Prostate ==
Prostate cryoablation is moderately effective but, as with any prostate removal process, also can result in impotence. Prostate cryoablation is used in three patient categories:

1. as primary therapy in patients for whom sexual function is less important or who are poor candidates for radical retropubic prostatectomy (RRP, surgical removal of the prostate);
2. as salvage therapy in patients who have failed brachytherapy (the use of implanted radioactive "seeds" placed within the prostate) or external beam radiation therapy (EBRT); and
3. focal therapy for smaller, discrete tumors in younger patients.

== Bone cancer ==
Cryoablation has been explored as an alternative to radiofrequency ablation in the treatment of moderate to severe pain in people with metastatic bone disease. The area of tissue destruction created by this technique can be monitored more effectively by CT than RFA, a potential advantage when treating tumors adjacent to critical structures.

== Renal ==
Cryoablation has similar outcomes to radiofrequency ablation when treating renal cell carcinoma.

== Breast cancer ==
Cryoablation for breast cancer is typically only possible for small tumors. Often surgery is used following cryoablation. As of 2014 more research is required before it can replace lumpectomy.

== Cardiac ==
Another type of cryoablation is used to restore normal electrical conduction by freezing tissue or heart pathways that interfere with the normal distribution of the heart's electrical impulses. Cryoablation is used in two types of intervention for the treatment of arrhythmias: (1) catheter-based procedures and (2) surgical operations.

A catheter is a very thin tube that is inserted into a vein in the patient's leg and threaded to the heart where it delivers energy to treat the patient's arrhythmia. In surgical procedures, a flexible probe is used directly on an exposed heart to apply the energy that interrupts the arrhythmia. By cooling the tip of a cryoablation catheter (cardiology) or probe (heart surgery) to sub-zero temperatures, the cells in the heart responsible for conducting the arrhythmia are altered so that they no longer conduct electrical impulses.

== Fibroadenoma ==
Cryoablation is also currently being used to treat fibroadenomas of the breast. Fibroadenomas are benign breast tumors that are found in approximately 10% of women (primarily ages 15–30).

In this procedure which has been approved by the U.S. Food and Drug Administration (FDA), an ultrasound-guided probe is inserted into the fibroadenoma and extremely cold temperatures are then used to destroy the abnormal cells. Over time the cells are reabsorbed into the body. The procedure can be performed in a doctor's office setting with local anesthesia and leaves very little scarring compared to open surgical procedures.

== Catheter-based procedures ==
Different catheter-based ablation techniques may be used and they generally fall into two categories: (1) cold-based procedures where tissue cooling is used to treat the arrhythmia, and (2) heat-based procedures where high temperature is used to alter the abnormal conductive tissue in the heart.

=== Cryoablation ===
Cold temperatures are used in cryoablation to chill or freeze cells that conduct abnormal heart rhythms. The catheter removes heat from the tissue to cool it to temperatures as low as -75 °C. This causes localized scarring, which cuts undesired conduction paths.

This is a much newer treatment for supraventricular tachycardia (SVT) involving the atrioventricular (AV) node directly. SVT involving the AV node is often a contraindication for using radiofrequency ablation because of the risk of injuring the AV node, forcing patients to receive a permanent pacemaker. With cryoablation, areas of tissue can be mapped by limited, reversible, freezing (e.g., to -10 C). If the result is undesirable, the tissue can be rewarmed without permanent damage. Otherwise, the tissue can be permanently ablated by freezing it to a lower temperature (e.g., -73 C).

This therapy has revolutionized AV nodal reentrant tachycardia (AVNRT) and other AV nodal tachyarrhythmias. It has allowed people who were otherwise not a candidate for radiofrequency ablation to have a chance at having their problem cured. This technology was developed at The Montreal Heart Institute in the late 1990s. The therapy was successfully adopted in Europe in 2001, and in the US in 2004 following the "Frosty Trial".

In 2004, the technology was pioneered in the midwest United States at Miami Valley Hospital in Dayton, Ohio, by Mark Krebs, MD, FACC, Matthew Hoskins, RN, BSN and Ken Peterman, RN, BSN. These electrophysiology experts were successful in curing the first 12 candidates in their facility.

Cryoablation for AVNRT and other arrhythmias do have some drawbacks. A recent study concluded that procedure times are slightly higher on average for cryoablation than for traditional radio-frequency (heat-based) ablations. Also, higher rate of equipment failures were recorded using this technique. Finally, even though short term success rate is equivalent to RF treatments, cryoablation appears to have a significantly higher long term recurrence rate.

Cryoanalgesia can be performed using various techniques, primarily categorized into percutaneous and intraoperative approaches. The percutaneous approach involves inserting a cryoprobe through the skin under imaging guidance (e.g., fluoroscopy, ultrasound, or CT) to precisely target the nerve. This is common for intercostal or occipital nerve blocks. The intraoperative approach involves direct visualization and application of the cryoprobe to nerves exposed during surgery, often utilized during thoracotomy or other procedures where nerves are easily accessible.

== Site testing ==
Cryotherapy is able to produce a temporary electrical block by cooling down the tissue believed to be conducting the arrhythmia. This allows the physician to make sure this is the right site before permanently disabling it. The ability to test a site in this way is referred to as site testing or cryomapping.

When ablating tissue near the AV node (a special conduction center that carries electrical impulses from the atria to the ventricles), there is a risk of producing heart block – that is, normal conduction from the atria cannot be transmitted to the ventricles. Freezing tissue near the AV node is less likely to provoke irreversible heart block than ablating it with heat.

== Surgical procedures ==
As in catheter-based procedures, techniques using heating or cooling temperatures may be used to treat arrhythmias during heart surgery. Techniques also exist where incisions are used in the open heart to interrupt abnormal electrical conduction (Maze procedure). Cryosurgery involves the use of freezing techniques for the treatment of arrhythmias during surgery.

A physician may recommend cryosurgery being used during the course of heart surgery as a secondary procedure to treat any arrhythmia that was present or that may appear during the primary open-chest procedure. The most common heart operations in which cryosurgery may be used in this way are mitral valve repairs and coronary artery bypass grafting. During the procedure, a flexible cryoprobe is placed on or around the heart and delivers cold energy that disables tissue responsible for conducting the arrhythmia.

== Vascular malformations ==
Cryoablation has recently been used to treat low-flow vascular malformations such as venous malformations (VM) and fibroadipose vascular anomalies (FAVA). Cryoablation has proved effective for treating these disorders both as primary treatment and after sclerotherapy.

== Cryoimmunotherapy ==
Cryoimmunotherapy is an oncological treatment for various cancers that combines cryoablation of tumor with immunotherapy treatment. In-vivo cryoablation of a tumor alone can induce an immunostimulatory, systemic anti-tumor response, resulting in a cancer vaccine – the abscopal effect. However, cryoablation alone may produce an insufficient immune response, depending on various factors, such as high freeze rate. Combining cryotherapy with immunotherapy enhances the immunostimulating response and has synergistic effects for cancer treatment.

== History ==
The use of cold for pain relief and as an anti-inflammatory has been known since the time of Hippocrates (460–377 BC). Since then there have been numerous accounts of ice used for pain relief including from the Ancient Egyptians and Avicenna of Persia (AD 982–1070). Since 1899, Dr. Campbell White used refrigerants for treating a variety of conditions, including: lupus erythematosus, herpes zoster, chancroid, naevi, warts, varicose leg ulcers, carbuncles, carcinomas and epitheliomas. De Quervain successfully used of carbonic snow to treat bladder papillomas and bladder cancers in 1917. Dr. Irving S. Cooper, in 1913, progressed the field of cryotherapy by designing a liquid nitrogen probe capable of achieving temperatures of -196 °C, and utilizing it to treat of Parkinson's disease and previously inoperable cancer. Cooper's cryoprobe advanced the practice of cryotherapy, which led to growing interest and practice of cryotherapy. In 1964, Dr. Cahan successfully used his liquid nitrogen probe invention to treat uterine fibroids and cervical cancer. Cryotherapy continued to advance with Dr. Amoils developing a liquid nitrogen probe capable of achieving cooling expansion, in 1967.

With the technological cryoprobe advancements in the 1960s came wider acceptance and practice of cryotherapy. Since the 1960s, liver, prostate, breast, bone, and other cancers have been treated with cryoablation in many parts of the world. Japanese physician Dr. Tanaka began treating metastatic breast cancer with cryoablation in 1968. For the next three decades, Dr. Tanaka successfully treated small and localized as well as advanced and unresectable breast cancer with minimally invasive cryoablation. All of Dr. Tanaka's breast cancer cases were considered incurable: advanced, unresectable, and resistant to radiotherapy, chemotherapy, and endocrine therapy. At the same time, physicians, including Dr. Ablin and Dr. Gage, started utilizing cryoablation for the treatment of prostate and bone cancer. Dr. Paul J. Wang MD and Dr. Peter L. Friedman MD, PhD invented cryoablation for the heart and cardiac arrhythmia in 1988. Their patents were for the cryoablation catheter and cryogenic mapping (US Patents 5147355A and 5423807A).

The 1980s and 1990s saw dramatic advancement in apparatus and imaging techniques, with the introduction of CMS Cryoprobe, and Accuprobe. CT-, MRI-, and ultrasound-guided cryoprobes became available and improved the capabilities of cryoprobes in treatment. Excited by the latest advancements in cryotherapy, China embraced cryotherapy in the 1990s to treat many oncological conditions. With the benefits well-established, the FDA approved the treatment of prostate cancer with cryoablation in 1998.

== See also ==
- Interventional radiology
