= Vinyl ester =

Vinyl acetate, a commercially important monomer

Vinyl ester refers to esters formally derived from vinyl alcohol. Commercially important examples of these monomers are vinyl acetate, vinyl propionate, and vinyl laurate. Vinyl acetate is a common name for Ethenyl ethanoate.
