= Cerebral arteriovenous malformation =

Abnormal connection between the arteries and veins in the brain

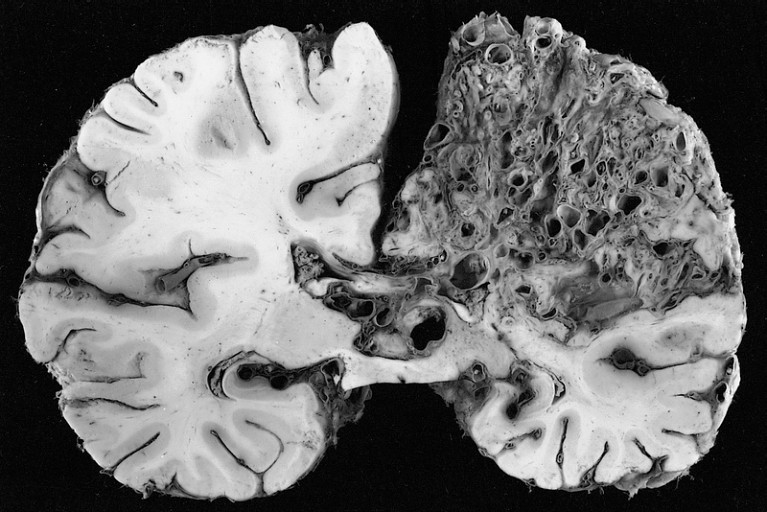
- Large arteriovenous malformation of the parietal lobe
- Specialty: Medical genetics

A cerebral arteriovenous malformation (cerebral AVM, CAVM, cAVM, brain AVM, or BAVM) is an abnormal connection between the arteries and veins in the brain—specifically, an arteriovenous malformation in the cerebrum.

== Signs and symptoms ==
The most frequently observed problems related to a cerebral arteriovenous malformation (AVM) are headaches and seizures, cranial nerve afflictions including pinched nerve and palsy, backaches, neckaches, and nausea from coagulated blood that has made its way down to be dissolved in the cerebrospinal fluid. Perhaps 15% of the population at detection are asymptomatic. Other common symptoms are a pulsing noise in the head, progressive weakness, numbness and vision changes as well as debilitating, excruciating pain.

In serious cases, blood vessels rupture and cause bleeding within the brain (intracranial hemorrhage). (Note: Small AVMs cause hemorrhages more often than larger ones.) In more than half of patients with AVM, this is the first symptom. Symptoms due to bleeding include loss of consciousness, sudden and severe headache, nausea, vomiting, incontinence, and blurred vision, amongst others. Impairments caused by local brain-tissue damage on the bleed site are also possible, including seizure, one-sided weakness (hemiparesis), a loss of touch sensation on one side of the body and deficits in language processing (aphasia). Ruptured AVMs are responsible for considerable mortality and morbidity.

AVMs in certain critical locations may stop the circulation of the cerebrospinal fluid, causing it to accumulate within the skull and giving rise to a clinical condition called hydrocephalus. A stiff neck can occur as the result of increased pressure within the skull and irritation of the meninges.

== Pathophysiology ==
A cerebral AVM is an abnormal anastomosis (connection) between the arteries and veins in the brain due to the lack of a capillary bed, and is most commonly of prenatal origin.

In normal cerebral circulation, oxygen-enriched blood from the heart travels in sequence through smaller blood vessels going from arteries, to arterioles and then capillaries. Oxygen is removed in the capillaries to be used by the brain. After the oxygen is removed, blood reaches venules and later veins which will take it back to the heart and lungs. A cerebral AVM causes blood to be shunted directly from arteries to veins because the capillary bed is lacking, causing a disrupted circulation.

The overall annual incidence of haemorrhage from a ruptured AVM is 2-4%. Smaller AVMs have a greater propensity for haemorrhaging, whereas larger AVMs tend to more often cause seizures instead.

== Diagnosis ==
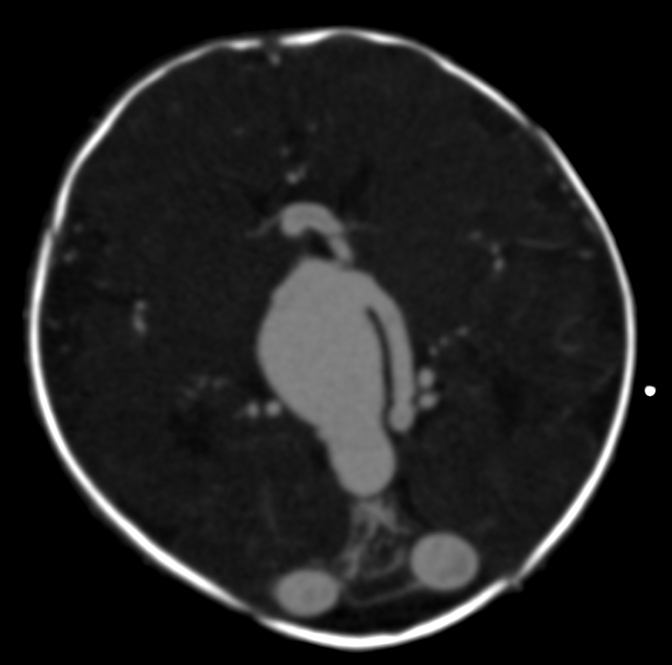
Axial image from computerized tomography angiogram showing arteriovenous communication in vein of Galen malformation

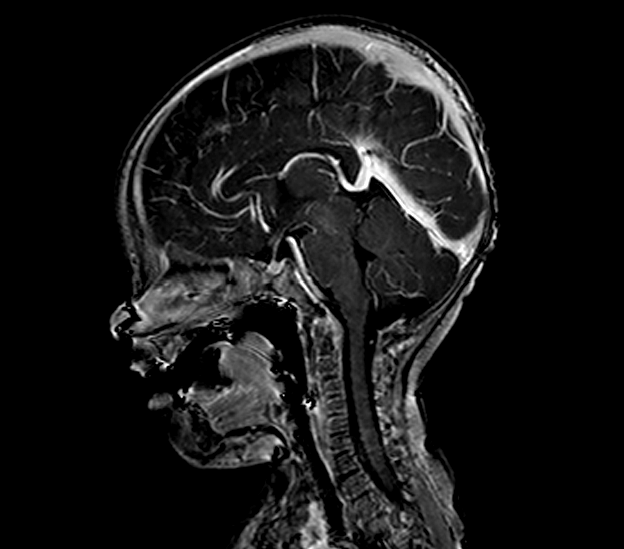
Vein of Galen thrombosis from ventricular puncture, not to be mistaken for an aneurysmal malformation

A cerebral AVM diagnosis is established by neuroimaging studies after a complete neurological and physical examination. Three main techniques are used to visualize the brain and search for an AVM: computed tomography (CT), magnetic resonance imaging (MRI), and cerebral angiography. A CT scan of the head is usually performed first when the subject is symptomatic. It can suggest the approximate site of the bleed. MRI is more sensitive than CT in the diagnosis, and provides better information about the exact location of the malformation. More detailed pictures of the tangle of blood vessels that compose an AVM can be obtained by using radiocontrast agents injected into the blood stream. As the contrast agent flows through the AVM structure, a sequence of X-ray images are obtained that would otherwise not be distinguishable with X-ray fluoroscopy imaging due to low contrast. If a CT is used in conjunction with an angiogram, this is called a computerized tomography angiogram; while, if MRI is used it is called magnetic resonance angiogram. Modern forms of Cerebral angiography are Digital subtraction angiography and Rotational angiography.

== Grading ==
=== Spetzler-Martin (SM) Grade ===
A common method of grading cerebral AVMs is the Spetzler-Martin (SM) grade. This system was designed to assess the patient's risk of neurological deficit after open surgical resection (surgical morbidity), based on characteristics of the AVM itself. Based on this system, AVMs may be classified as grades 1–5. This system was not intended to characterize risk of hemorrhage.

AVM size	Adjacent eloquent cortex	Draining veins
< 3 cm = 1	Non-eloquent = 0	Superficial only = 0
3 – 6 cm = 2	Eloquent* = 1	Deep veins = 1
> 6 cm = 3		

"Eloquent" is defined as areas within the brain that, if removed will result in loss of sensory processing or linguistic ability, minor paralysis, or paralysis. These include the basal ganglia, language cortices, sensorimotor regions, and white matter tracts. Importantly, eloquent areas are often defined differently across studies where deep cerebellar nuclei, cerebral peduncles, thalamus, hypothalamus, internal capsule, brainstem, and the visual cortex could be included.

The risk of post-surgical neurological deficit (difficulty with language, motor weakness, vision loss) increases with increasing Spetzler-Martin grade.

=== Supplemented Spetzler-Martin (SM-supp, Lawton-Young) Grade ===
A limitation of the Spetzler-Martin Grading system is that it does not include the following factors: Patient age, hemorrhage, diffuseness of nidus, and arterial supply. In 2010 a new supplemented Spetzler-Martin system (SM-supp, Lawton-Young) was devised adding these variables to the SM system. Under this new system AVMs are classified from grades 1–10. It has since been determined to have greater predictive accuracy than SM grades alone.

Variable	Spetzler-Martin Grading Scale		Supplemental Grading Scale	
Variable	Definition	Points	Definition	Points
AVM size	< 3 cm	1		
AVM size	3 – 6 cm	2		
AVM size	> 6 cm	3		
Deep venous drainage	No	0		
	Yes	1		
Eloquence	No	0		
	Yes	1		
SM Grade Subtotal		(1 - 5)		
Age			< 20 years	1
Age			20 – 40 years	2
Age			> 40 years	3
Unruptured presentation			No	0
Unruptured presentation			Yes	1
Diffuse			No	0
Diffuse			Yes	1
SM-Supp Grade Subtotal				(1 – 5)
SM-Supp Total				(1 – 10)

== Treatment ==
Treatment depends on the location and size of the AVM and whether there is bleeding or not.

The treatment in the case of sudden bleeding is focused on restoration of vital function.

=== Medical ===
Anticonvulsant medications such as phenytoin are often used to control seizure; medications or procedures may be employed to relieve intracranial pressure. Eventually, curative treatment may be required to prevent recurrent hemorrhage. However, any type of intervention may also carry a risk of creating a neurological deficit.

=== Surgical ===
Surgical elimination of the blood vessels involved is the preferred curative treatment for many types of AVM. Surgery is performed by a neurosurgeon who temporarily removes part of the skull (craniotomy), separates the AVM from surrounding brain tissue, and resects the abnormal vessels. While surgery can result in an immediate, complete removal of the AVM, risks exist depending on the size and the location of the malformation. The AVM must be resected en bloc, for partial resection will likely cause severe hemorrhage. The preferred treatment of Spetzler-Martin grade 1 and 2 AVMs in young, healthy patients is surgical resection due to the relatively small risk of neurological damage compared to the high lifetime risk of hemorrhage. Grade 3 AVMs may or may not be amenable to surgery. Grade 4 and 5 AVMs are not usually surgically treated.

=== Radiosurgical ===
Radiosurgery has been widely used on small AVMs with considerable success. The Gamma Knife is an apparatus used to precisely apply a controlled radiation dosage to the volume of the brain occupied by the AVM. While this treatment does not require an incision and craniotomy (with their own inherent risks), three or more years may pass before the complete effects are known, during which time patients are at risk of bleeding. Complete obliteration of the AVM may or may not occur after several years, and repeat treatment may be needed. Radiosurgery is itself not without risk. In one large study, nine percent of patients had transient neurological symptoms, including headache, after radiosurgery for AVM. However, most symptoms resolved, and the long-term rate of neurological symptoms was 3.8%.

=== Neuroendovascular therapy ===
Embolization is performed by interventional neuroradiologists and the occlusion of blood vessels most commonly is obtained with ethylene vinyl alcohol copolymer (Onyx) or n-butyl cyanoacrylate (a type of glue). These substances are introduced by a radiographically guided catheter, and block vessels responsible for blood flow into the AVM. Angiography uses a radiocontrast agent to make the blood vessels visible with fluoroscope technology. Embolization is frequently used as an adjunct to either surgery or radiation treatment. Embolization reduces the size of the AVM and during surgery it reduces the risk of bleeding. However, embolization alone may completely obliterate some AVMs. In high flow intranidal fistulas balloons can also be used to reduce the flow so that embolization can be done safely.

=== Risks ===
A first-of-its-kind controlled clinical trial by the National Institutes of Health and National Institute of Neurological Disorders and Stroke focuses on the risk of stroke or death in patients with an AVM who either did or did not undergo interventional eradication. Early results suggest that the invasive treatment of unruptured AVMs tends to yield worse results than the therapeutic (medical) management of symptoms. (Note: According to established medical research, however, the chance of eventual hemorrhage increases over time.) Because of the higher-than-expected experimental event rate (e.g. stroke or death), patient enrollment was halted by May 2013, while the study intended to follow participants (over a planned 5 to 10 years) to determine which approach seems to produce better long-term results.

== Prognosis ==
The main risk is intracranial hemorrhage. This risk is difficult to quantify since many patients with asymptomatic AVMs will never come to medical attention. Small AVMs tend to bleed more often than do larger ones, the opposite of cerebral aneurysms. If a rupture or bleeding incident occurs, the blood may penetrate either into the brain tissue (cerebral hemorrhage) or into the subarachnoid space, which is located between the sheaths (meninges) surrounding the brain (subarachnoid hemorrhage). Bleeding may also extend into the ventricular system (intraventricular hemorrhage). Cerebral hemorrhage appears to be most common. One long-term study (mean follow up greater than 20 years) of over 150 symptomatic AVMs (either presenting with bleeding or seizures) found the risk of cerebral hemorrhage to be approximately 4% per year, slightly higher than the 2–4% seen in other studies. The earlier an AVM appears, the more likely it is to cause hemorrhage over one's lifetime; e.g. (assuming a 3% annual risk), an AVM appearing at 25 years of age indicates a 79% lifetime chance of hemorrhage, while one appearing at age 85 indicates only a 17% chance. Ruptured AVMs are a significant source of morbidity and mortality; following a rupture, as many as 29% of patients will die, with only 55% able to live independently.

== Epidemiology ==
The annual new detection rate incidence of AVMs is approximately 1 per 100,000 a year. The point prevalence in adults is approximately 18 per 100,000. AVMs are more common in males than females, although in females pregnancy may start or worsen symptoms due to the increase in blood flow and volume it usually brings. There is a significant preponderance (15–20%) of AVM in patients with hereditary hemorrhagic telangiectasia (Osler–Weber–Rendu syndrome).
