= Polyvinyl (disambiguation) =

Polyvinyl is a group of polymers derived from vinyl monomers.

Polyvinyl may also refer to:

- Polyvinyl chloride
- Polyvinyl acetate
- Polyvinyl alcohol
- Polyvinyl Record Co., an independent record label
