= Ethylene-vinyl acetate =

Names
- Other names Poly(ethylene-vinyl acetate); poly(ethylene-co-vinyl acetate); polyethylene-vinyl acetate copolymer

Identifiers
CAS Number	24937-78-8
Abbreviations	EVA; PEVA
ChEBI	CHEBI:166881
ChemSpider	none
ECHA InfoCard	100.133.085
PubChem CID	32742
UNII	4OKC630HS6
CompTox Dashboard (EPA)	DTXSID0049814

Properties
Chemical formula	(C_{2}H_{4})_{n}(C_{4}H_{6}O_{2})_{m}
Molar mass	Variable
Melting point	90 °C (194 °F)

Hazards
Safety data sheet (SDS)	MSDS
- Except where otherwise noted, data are given for materials in their standard state (at 25 °C [77 °F], 100 kPa). verify (what is ?) Infobox references

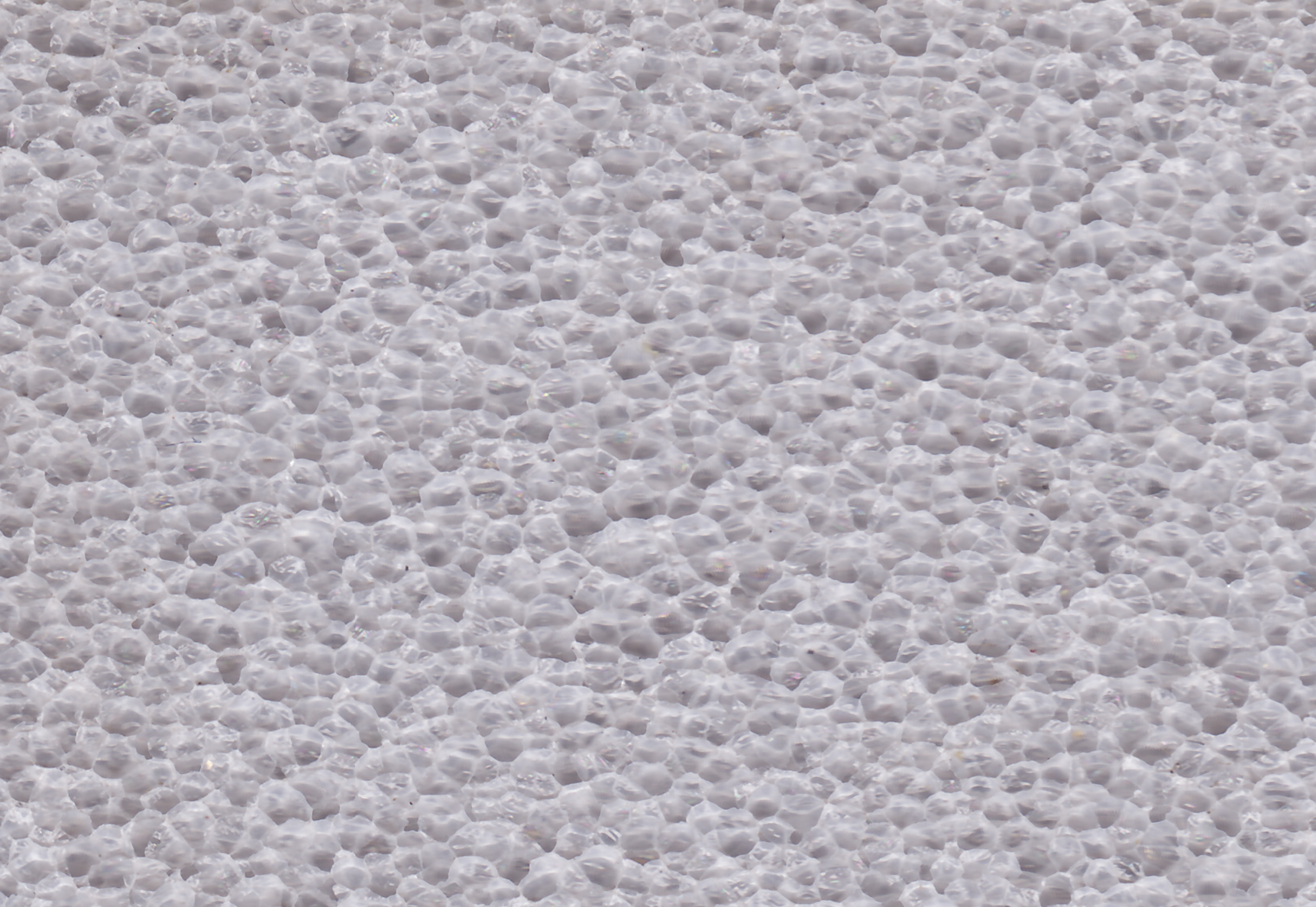
Close-up of open-celled EVA

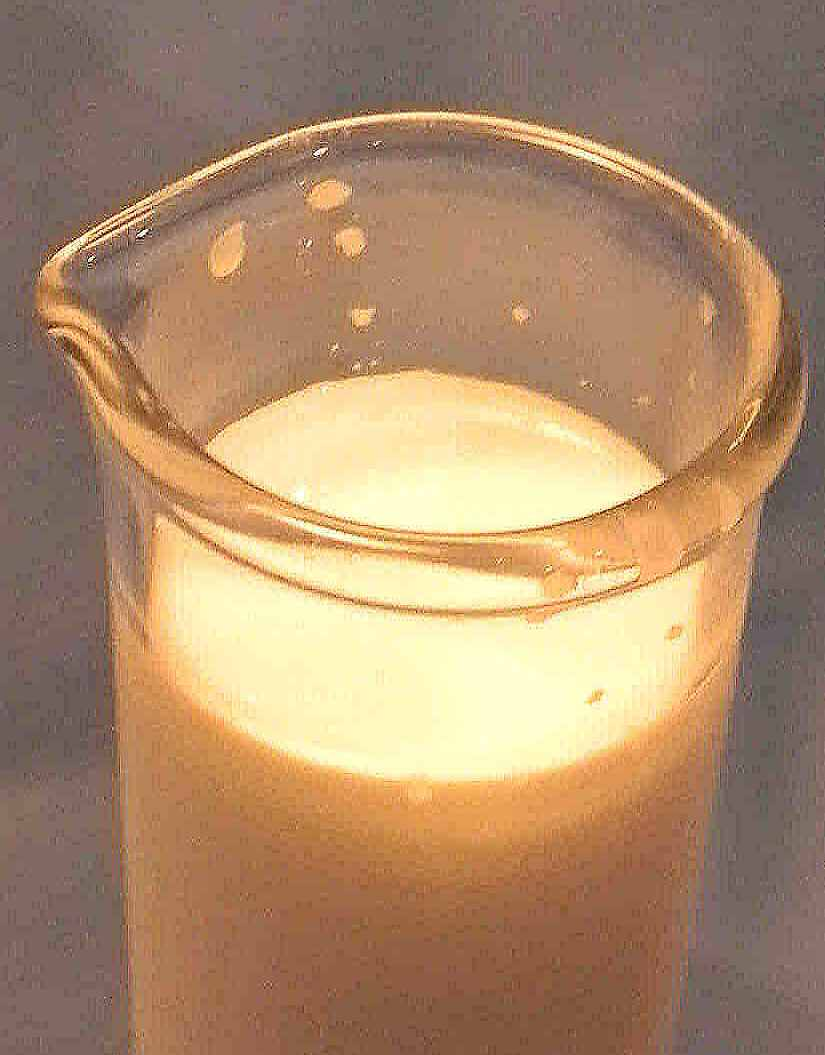
EVA polymer "milk"

Ethylene-vinyl acetate (EVA), also known as poly(ethylene-vinyl acetate) (PEVA), is an elastomeric copolymer of ethylene and vinyl acetate that produces materials which are "rubber-like" in softness and flexibility. The material has good clarity and gloss, low-temperature toughness, stress-crack resistance, hot-melt adhesive waterproof properties, and resistance to UV radiation. EVA has a distinctive vinegar-like odor and is competitive with rubber and vinyl polymer products in many electrical applications.

The types of EVA copolymers differ in the vinyl acetate (VA) content and the way the materials are used. The weight percent of vinyl acetate usually varies from 1 to 40%, with the remainder being ethylene. Many properties of the copolymer are determined by the VA content, although the glass transition temperature is relatively invariant at -25 to -30 °C.

EVA copolymer which is based on a low proportion of VA (approximately up to 4%) may be referred to as vinyl acetate modified polyethylene. It is a copolymer and is processed as a thermoplastic material – just like low-density polyethylene. It has some of the properties of a low-density polyethylene but increased gloss (useful for film), softness and flexibility. The material is generally considered non-toxic.

EVA copolymer which is based on a medium proportion of VA (approximately 4 to 30%) is referred to as thermoplastic ethylene-vinyl acetate copolymer and is a thermoplastic elastomer material. It is not vulcanized but has some of the properties of a rubber or of plasticized polyvinyl chloride particularly at the higher end of the range. Both filled and unfilled EVA materials have good low temperature properties and are tough. The materials with approximately 11% VA are used as hot-melt adhesives.

EVA copolymer which is based on a high proportion of VA (greater than 60%) is referred to as ethylene-vinyl acetate rubber.

== Production ==
EVA is obtained via chain-growth polymerization of ethylene and vinyl acetate. There are several techniques of polymerization that can be applied to this polymer, such as solution, suspension, bulk, and emulsion polymerization. A widely used technique consist in high-pressure bulk polymerization process, either in tubular reactors or autoclave reactors. Although less popular, others processes have been investigated, in particular, one study investigated the feasibility of a continuous emulsion reaction. Typically, this reaction takes place with a solvent (when the polymerization process isn't carried in emulsion phase), like a low molecular weight alcohol, such as methanol. Usually, the reaction is initiated with an azo compound or a peroxide (used between 0.002% and 0.1% w/w). The temperature of reaction is preferably kept between 40°C and 80°C. Conversion rates should not exceed 60%: from a thermodynamic point of view, this is an exothermic reaction, and controlling the temperature could be much more difficult if the viscosity is too high. Researchers demonstrated that although EVA is a widely used polymer, the kinetics parameters of the polymerization are incredibly complex. Using computational tools, it was determined that theEVA polymerization process consists primarily of four reactions: chain initiation, chain growth, chain transfer, and chain termination. Specifically, chain growth is responsible for the degree of polymerization and the average molecular weight, while chain transfer is responsible for the dispersity.

== Applications ==
Some objects made of EVA

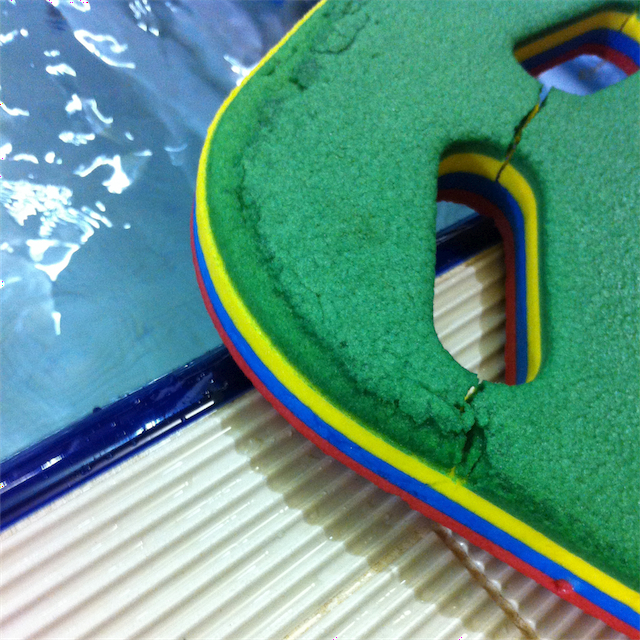
Foam kickboard

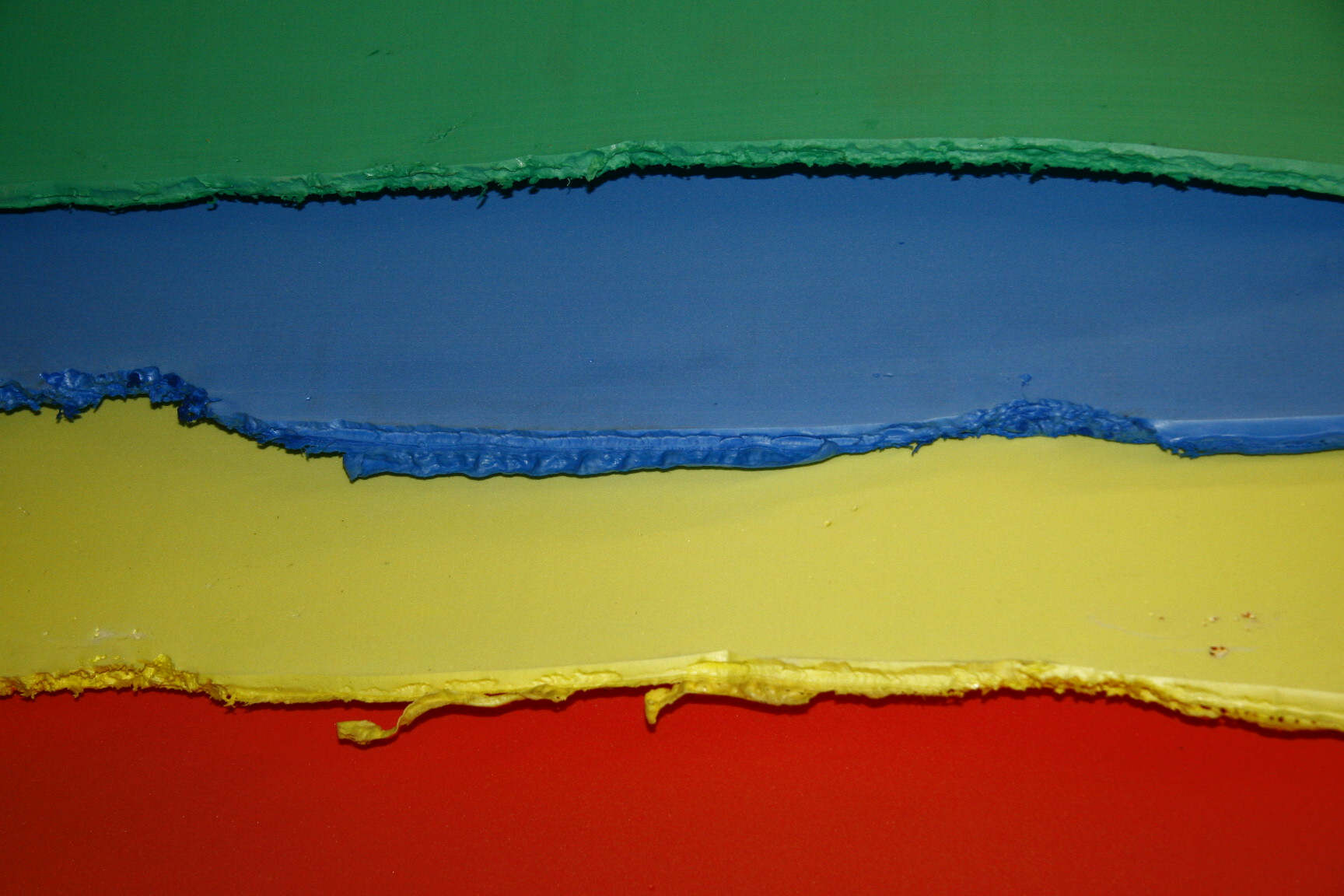
EVA foam sheets

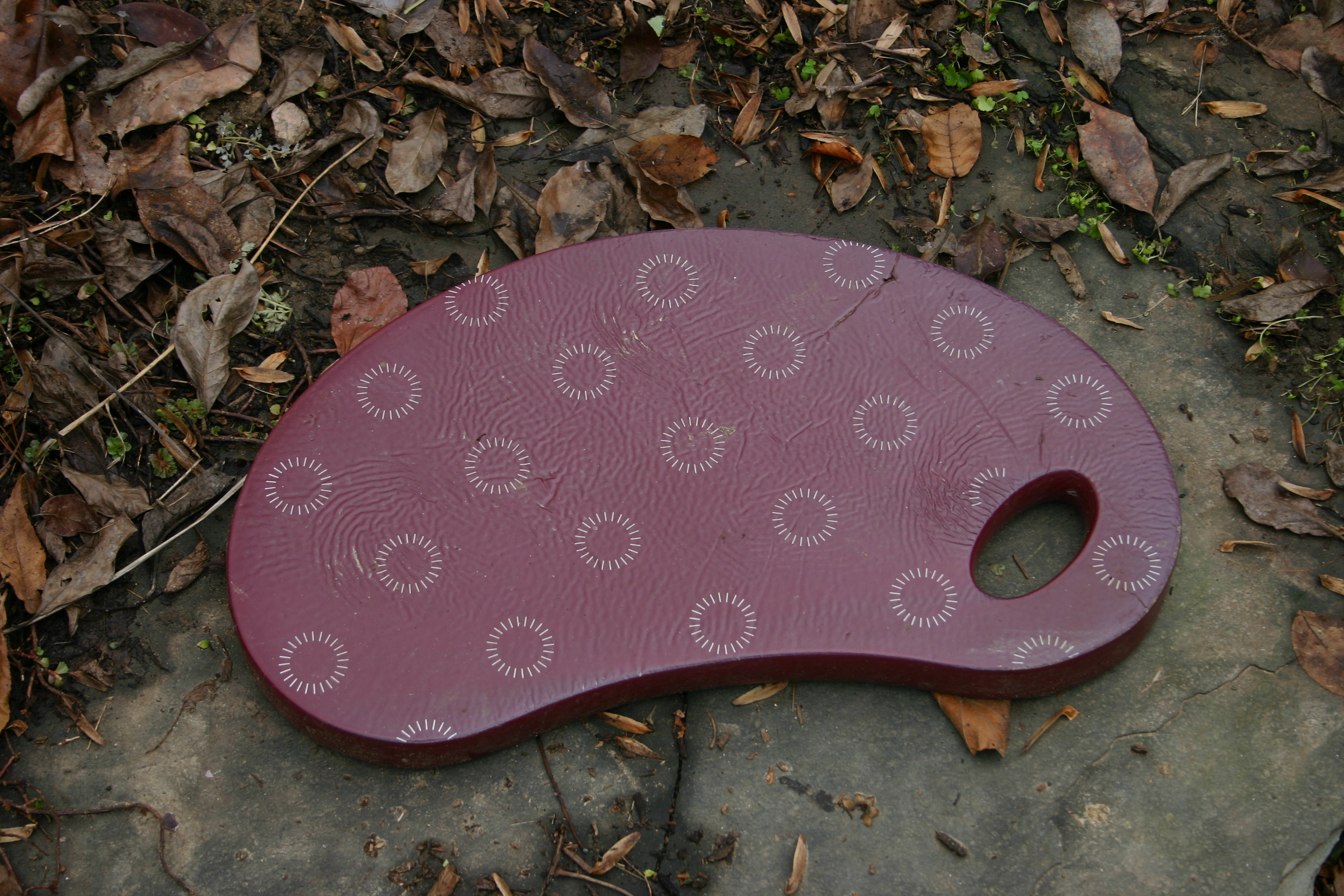
Garden kneeler

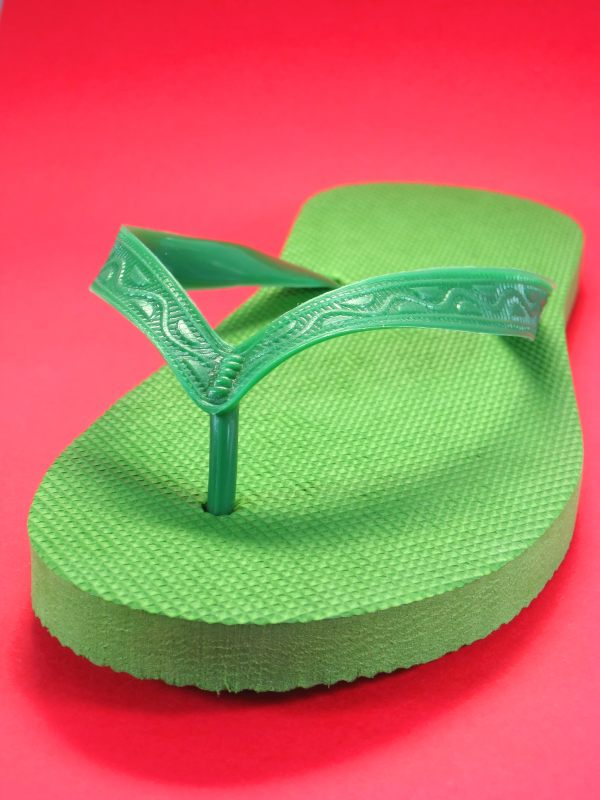
Flip-flop sole

Foam Crocs

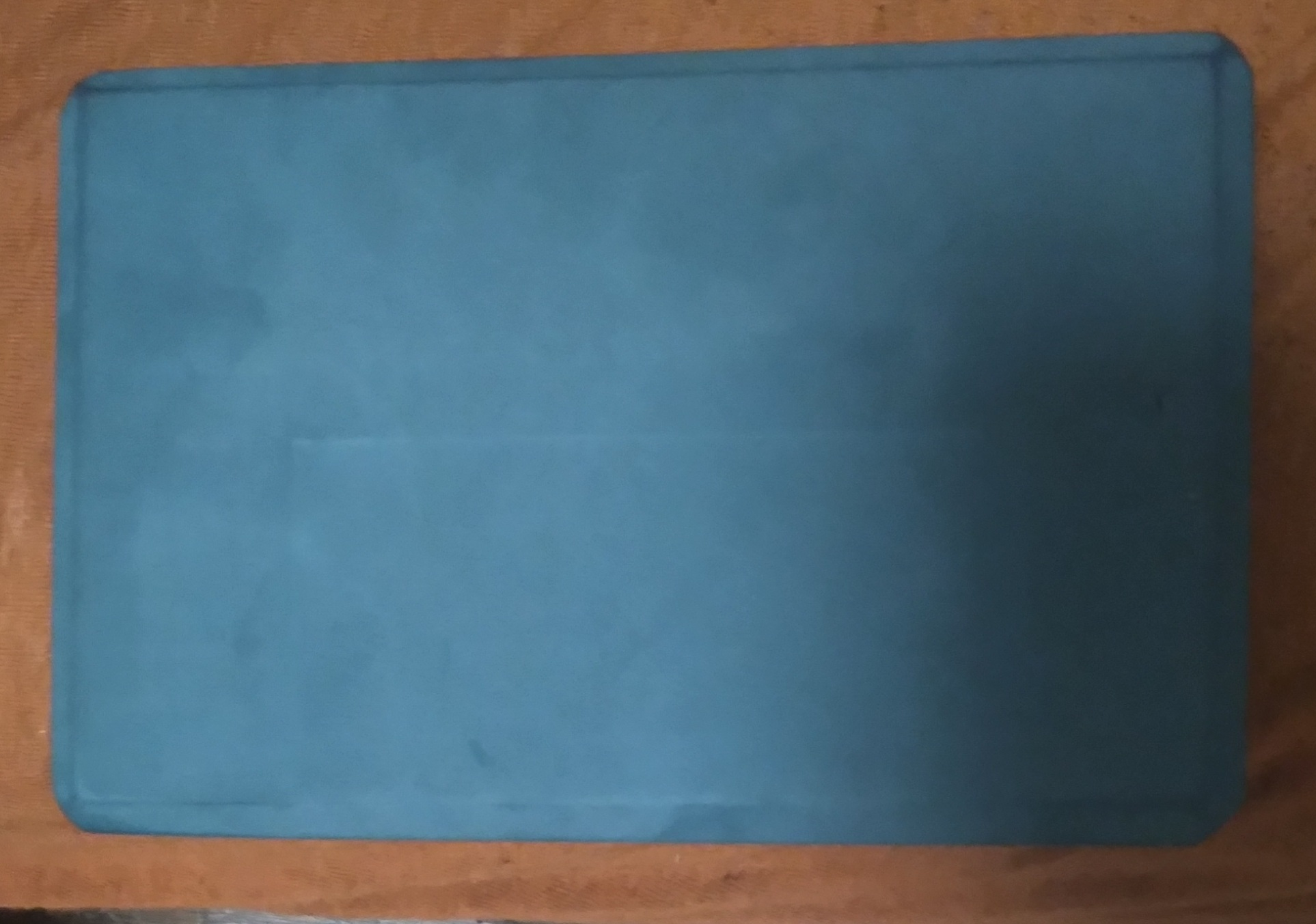
Yoga blocks are commonly made of EVA, as are some mats

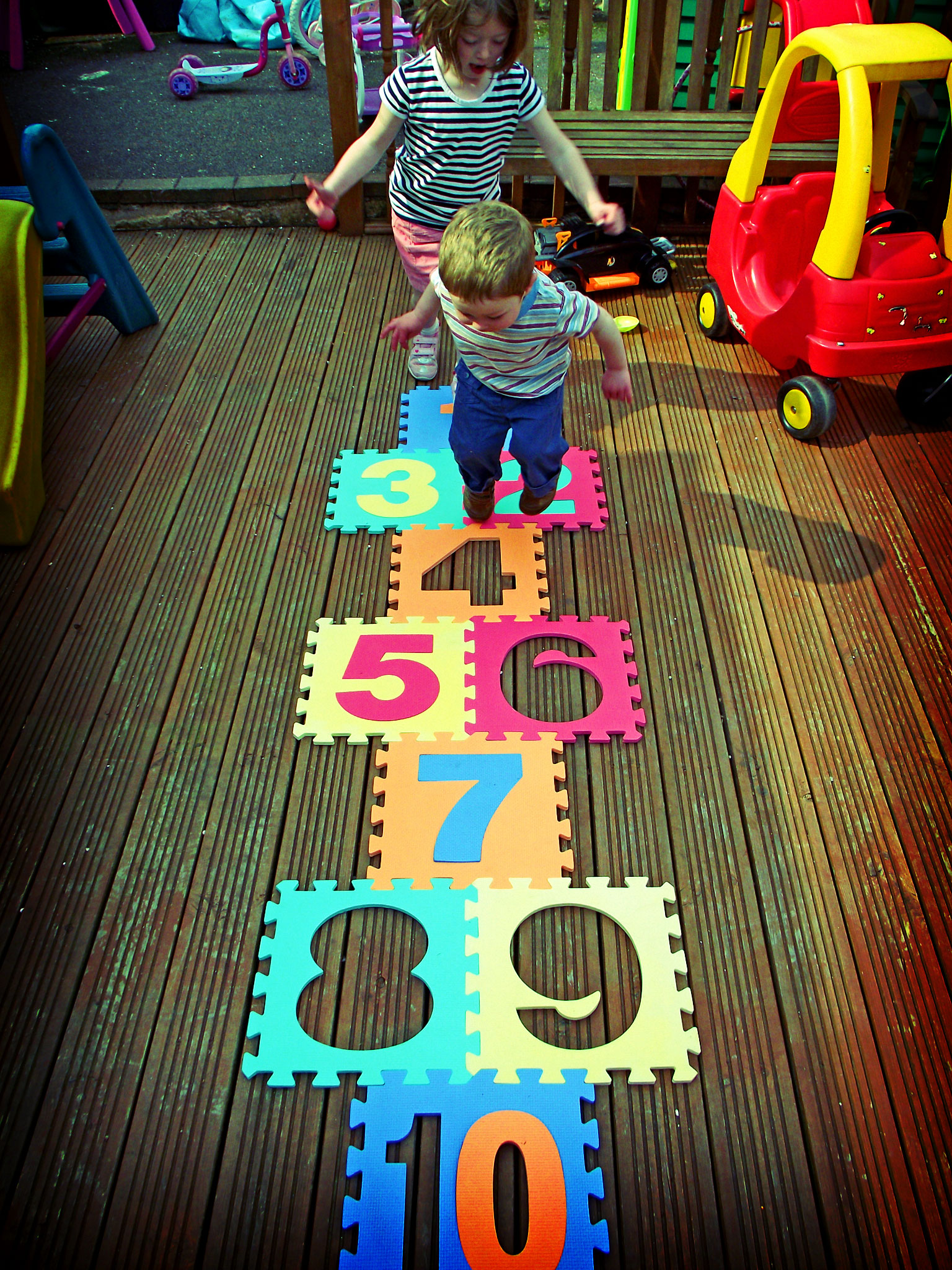
Interlocking floor tiles are often made from EVA foam

Hot-melt adhesives (such as hot glue sticks) are usually made from EVA, generally with additives like wax and resin. EVA is also used as a cling-enhancing additive in plastic wraps. Craft-foam sheets are made of EVA.

=== Biomedical ===
EVA is used in biomedical engineering applications for drug delivery systems. Examples include transdermal, implants, transmucosal, vaginal, subcutaneous, ocular, and brain. Hydrolysis of EVA gives ethylene vinyl alcohol (EVOH) copolymer and acetic acid. It also degrades thermally.

=== Foam rubber ===
EVA is one of the materials popularly known as expanded rubber or foam rubber. The feature closed cells. Such foams are popular because, in addition to being inexpensive, their properties are adjustable by a number of processing conditions. EVA foam is used in baby and kids' play mats, and as padding in equipment for various sports such as ski boots, bicycle saddles, hockey pads, boxing and mixed-martial-arts gloves and helmets, wakeboard boots, waterski boots, fishing rods, and fishing-reel handles. It is typically used as a midsole shock absorber in sports shoes, for example). EVA can be used as a substitute for cork in many applications.

=== Apparel ===
EVA slippers and sandals are lightweight, easily formed, odourless, glossy, and lower in cost than natural rubber.

=== Photovoltaics ===
EVA is also used in the photovoltaics industry as an encapsulation material for crystalline silicon solar cells in the manufacture of photovoltaic modules. EVA protects the silicon and bonds its to the glass support.

=== Other uses ===
EVA copolymers are adhesives used in packaging, textile, bookbinding for bonding plastic films, metal surfaces, coated paper, and as redispersible powders in plasters and cement renders.

EVA is used in shower curtains, orthotics, surfboard and skimboard traction pads, car mats, and for the manufacturing of some artificial flowers.

EVA foam is used in costumes, largely in part due to its ease to work with, durability, and comfort in comparison to traditional plastic-based costumes.

EVA is also used in coatings formulation of good-quality interior water-borne paints at 53% primary dispersant.

EVA is used as a cold flow improver for diesel fuel. It is added at a 50-250 ppm level to diesel fuels to inhibit crystallization of waxes which could block fuel filters.

EVA is a separator in HEPA filters. EVA can easily be cut from sheets and molded to shape. It is also used to make thermoplastic mouthguards that soften in boiling water for a user-specific fit. It is also used for conditioning and waterproofing fabrics and leather. EVA is used in nicotine transdermal patches, since the copolymer binds well with other agents to form gel-like substances. EVA is also sometimes used as a material for some plastic model kit parts. One common use of EVA foam rubber is in low frequency (woofer) speaker cone surrounds (replacing rubber) because of its good mechanical and acoustic properties. Open cell EVA foam is used to damp high frequency acoustical diffraction from tweeter speakers and is often put in the area around the high frequency speaker driver to give better directivity and sonic imaging.

EVA is used for the manufacture of floats for commercial fishing gear such as purse seine and gillnets.

Because of its buoyancy, floating eyewear can be made of EVA.

EVA may be used in custom dental devices with a proper approach to hygiene.

== Safety and environmental considerations ==
EVA has not been found to be carcinogenic.

== See also ==
- Polyethylene
- Polyvinyl acetate
- Polyvinyl ester
- Vinyl polymer
