= PVN =

PVN can refer to:

- An abbreviation for paraventricular nucleus of the hypothalamus
- The Padvinders Vereniging Nederland (Pathfinder Association the Netherlands), one of the Scouting organisations that evolved into the Scouting Nederland
- Polyvinyl nitrate
- P. V. Narasimha Rao (1921–2004), former Prime Minister of India
- Peter van Nieuwenhuizen, Dutch physicist and co-discoverer of supergravity
- Petrovietnam national oil corporation of Vietnam
- Pirates versus Ninjas
- Pazov Vitaliy Nikolaevich
