= Polyvinyl-alcohol oxidase =

Class of enzymes

polyvinyl-alcohol oxidase

Identifiers
- EC no.: 1.1.3.30
- CAS no.: 119940-13-5

Databases
- IntEnz: IntEnz view
- BRENDA: BRENDA entry
- ExPASy: NiceZyme view
- KEGG: KEGG entry
- MetaCyc: metabolic pathway
- PRIAM: profile
- PDB structures: RCSB PDB PDBe PDBsum
- Gene Ontology: AmiGO / QuickGO
Search
- PMC: articles
- PubMed: articles
- NCBI: proteins

In enzymology, a polyvinyl-alcohol oxidase (EC 1.1.3.30) is an enzyme that catalyzes the chemical reaction

polyvinyl alcohol + O_{2} $\rightleftharpoons$ oxidized polyvinyl alcohol + H_{2}O_{2}

Thus, the two substrates of this enzyme are polyvinyl alcohol and O_{2}, whereas its two products are oxidized polyvinyl alcohol and H_{2}O_{2}.

This enzyme belongs to the family of oxidoreductases, specifically those acting on the CH-OH group of donor with oxygen as acceptor. The systematic name of this enzyme class is polyvinyl-alcohol:oxygen oxidoreductase. Other names in common use include dehydrogenase, polyvinyl alcohol, and PVA oxidase.
