= Polyvinyl nitrate =

Polyvinyl nitrate (abbreviated: PVN) is a high-energy polymer with the idealized formula of [CH_{2}CH(ONO_{2})]. Polyvinyl nitrate is a long carbon chain (polymer) with nitrate groups $\ce{(-O-NO2)}$ bonded randomly along the chain. PVN is a white, fibrous solid, and is soluble in polar organic solvents such as acetone. PVN can be prepared by nitrating polyvinyl alcohol with an excess of nitric acid. Because PVN is also a nitrate ester such as nitroglycerin (a common explosive), it exhibits energetic properties and is commonly used in explosives and propellants.

== Preparation ==
Polyvinyl nitrate was first synthesized by submersing polyvinyl alcohol (PVA) in a solution of concentrated sulfuric and nitric acids. This causes the PVA to lose a hydrogen atom from its hydroxy group (deprotonation), and the nitric acid (HNO_{3}) to lose a NO_{2}^{+} when in sulfuric acid. The NO_{2}^{+} attaches to the oxygen in the PVA and creates a nitrate group, producing polyvinyl nitrate. This method results in a low nitrogen content of 10% and an overall yield of 80%. This method is inferior, as PVA has a low solubility in sulfuric acid and a slow rate of nitration for PVA. This meant that a lot of sulfuric acid was needed relative to PVA and did not produce a high nitrogen PVN, which is desirable for its energetic properties.

An improved method is where PVA is nitrated without sulfuric acid; however, when this solution is exposed to air, the PVA combusts. In this new method, either the PVA nitration is done in an inert gas (carbon dioxide or nitrogen) or the PVA powder is clumped into larger particles and submerged underneath the nitric acid to limit the amount of air exposure.

Currently, the most common method is when PVA powder is dissolved in acetic anhydride at -10°C. Then cooled nitric acid is slowly added. This produces a high nitrogen content PVN within about 5-7 hours. Because acetic anhydride was used as the solvent instead of sulfuric acid, the PVA will not combust when exposed to air.

== Physical properties ==
PVN is a white thermoplastic with a softening point of 40-50°C. The theoretical maximum nitrogen content of PVN is 15.73%. PVN is a polymer that has an atactic configuration, meaning the nitrate groups are randomly distributed along the main chain. Fibrous PVN increases in crystallinity as the nitrogen content increases, showing that the PVN molecules organize themselves more orderly as nitrogen percent increases. Intramolecularly, the geometry of the polymer is planar zigzag. The porous PVN can be gelatinized when added to acetone at room temperature. This creates a viscous slurry and loses its fibrous and porous nature; however, it retains most of its energetic properties.

== Chemical properties ==
=== Combustion ===
Polyvinyl nitrate is a high-energy polymer due to the significant presence of $\ce{O - NO2}$ groups, similar to nitrocellulose and nitroglycerin. These nitrate groups have an activation energy of 53 kcal/mol are the primary cause of PVN's high chemical potential energy. The complete combustion reaction of PVN assuming full nitration is:

$$\ce{2CH2CH(ONO2) + 5/2O2 -> 4CO2 + N2 + 3H2O}$$

When burned, PVN samples with less nitrogen had a significantly higher heat of combustion because there were more hydrogen molecules and more heat was generated when oxygen was present. The heat of combustion was about 3,000 cal/g for 15.71% N and 3,700 cal/g for 11.76% N. Alternatively, PVN samples with a higher nitrogen content had a significantly higher heat of explosion as it had more $\ce{O - NO2}$ groups as it had more oxygen leading to more complete combustion. This leads to a more complete combustion and more heat generated when burned in inert or low oxygen environments.

=== Stability ===
Nitrate esters, in general, are unstable because of the weak $\ce{N - O}$ bond and tend to decompose at higher temperatures. Fibrous PVN is relatively stable at 80°C and is less stable as the nitrogen content increases. Gelatinized PVN is less stable than fibrous PVN.

=== Activation energy ===
Ignition temperature is the temperature at which a substance combusts spontaneously and requires no other additional energy (other than the temperature)/ This temperature can be used to determine the activation energy. For samples of varying nitrogen content, the ignition temperature decreases as nitrogen percentage increases, showing that PVN is more ignitable as nitrogen content increases. Using the Semenov equation:

$$D=Ce^{-E/RT}$$

where D is the ignition delay (the time it takes for a substance to ignite), E is the activation energy, R is the universal gas constant, T is absolute temperature, and C is a constant, dependent on the material.

The activation energy is greater than 13 kcal/mol and reaches 16 kcal/mol (at 15.71% nitrogen, near theoretical maximum) and varies greatly between different nitrogen concentrations and has no linear pattern between activation energy and the degree of nitration.

=== Impact sensitivity ===
The height at which a mass is dropped on PVN and causes an explosion shows the sensitivity of PVN to impacts. As nitrogen content increases, fibrous PVN is more sensitive to impacts. Gelatinous PVN is similar to fibrous PVN in impact sensitivity.

== Applications ==
Because of the nitrate groups of PVN, polyvinyl nitrate is mainly used for its explosive and energetic capabilities. Structurally, PVN is similar to nitrocellulose in that it is a polymer with several nitrate groups off the main branch, differing only in their main chain (carbon and cellulose respectively). Because of this similarity, PVN is typically used in explosives and propellants as a binder. In explosives, a binder is used to form an explosive where the explosive materials are difficult to mold (see Polymer-bonded explosive (PBX)). A common binder polymer is hydroxyl-terminated polybutadiene (HTPB) or glycidyl azide polymer (GAP). Moreover, the binder needs a plasticizer such as dioctyl adipate (DOP) or 2-nitrodiphenylamine (2-NDPA) to make the explosive more flexible. Polyvinyl nitrate combines the traits of both a binder and a plasticizer, as this polymer binds the explosive ingredients together and is flexible at is softening point (40-50°C). Moreover, PVN adds to the explosive's overall energetic potential due to its nitrate groups.

An example composition including polyvinyl nitrate is PVN, nitrocellulose and/or polyvinyl acetate, and 2-nitrodiphenylamine. This creates a moldable thermoplastic that can be combined with a powder containing nitrocellulose to create a cartridge case where the PVN composition acts as a propellant and assists as an explosive material.

== See also ==
- Nitrate ester
- Polyvinyl ester
- Vinyl polymer
