= C2H4O =

The molecular formula C_{2}H_{4}O (molar mass: 44.05 g/mol, exact mass: 44.0262 u) may refer to:

- Acetaldehyde (ethanal)
- Ethenol (vinyl alcohol)
- Ethylene oxide (epoxyethane, oxirane)
