= Ethylene vinyl alcohol =

Names
- Other names Ethenol, polymer with ethene

Identifiers
CAS Number	25067-34-9
ChemSpider	None
CompTox Dashboard (EPA)	DTXSID701010954

Properties
Chemical formula	(C_{2}H_{4}O-C_{2}H_{4})_{x}
- Except where otherwise noted, data are given for materials in their standard state (at 25 °C [77 °F], 100 kPa). Infobox references

Ethylene vinyl alcohol (EVOH) is a formal copolymer of ethylene and vinyl alcohol. Because the latter monomer mainly exists as its tautomer acetaldehyde, the copolymer is prepared by polymerization of ethylene and vinyl acetate to give the ethylene vinyl acetate (EVA) copolymer followed by hydrolysis. EVOH copolymer is defined by the mole % ethylene content: lower ethylene content grades have higher barrier properties; higher ethylene content grades have lower temperatures for extrusion.

The plastic resin is commonly used as an oxygen barrier in food packaging. It is better than other plastics at keeping air out and flavors in, is highly transparent, weather resistant, oil and solvent resistant, flexible, moldable, recyclable, and printable. Its drawback is that it is difficult to make and therefore more expensive than other food packaging. Instead of making an entire package out of EVOH, manufacturers keep costs down by coextruding or laminating it as a thin layer between cardboard, foil, or other plastics.

It is also used as a hydrocarbon barrier in plastic fuel tanks and pipes.

== Industrial production ==
Because of the high capital cost to build an EVOH plant, and the complexity of making a food grade product, only a few companies produce EVOH:

Kuraray produces EVOH resin under the name "EVAL," with a 10,000 ton plant in Okayama, Japan; a 58,000 ton plant in the U.S. (near Houston, TX) under its subsidiary Kuraray America; and a 35,000 ton plant in Belgium under its subsidiary EVAL Europe.

Nippon Gohsei produces EVOH under the trade name Soarnol. It has production sites in Mizushima, Japan; La Porte, Texas in the USA; and at Salt End, Hull, England.

Chang Chun Petrochemical produces EVOH under the trade name EVASIN. It has a single site in Taipei, Taiwan.

== Food packaging ==
Due to its strong barrier against gasses (especially oxygen), odors and flavours, food packaging manufacturers use EVOH in their packaging structure to extend the shelf life of food products.

A downside of EVOH is its relatively high moisture sensitivity, meaning that the barrier capabilities of EVOH decrease in environments with high humidity. As such, EVOH is often applied within a multilayer film. Here, one or more inside layers contain EVOH, but the outside layers consist of a different plastic that is less sensitive to moisture, such as polyethylene.

== Medical applications ==
EVOH is used in a liquid embolic system in interventional radiology, e.g. in Onyx. Dissolved in dimethyl sulfoxide (DMSO) and mixed with a radiopaque substance, ethylene vinyl alcohol copolymer is used to embolize blood vessels.

== See also ==
- Copolymer
- Ethylene-vinyl acetate
- Polyethylene
- Plastic
- Food packaging
- Plastic recycling
- Interventional radiology
- Embolization
