= Cellulose acetate phthalate =

Names
- Systematic IUPAC name Cellulose, acetate, 1,2-benzenedicarboxylate
- Other names CAP; Cellacefate; Cellulosi acetas phthalas

Identifiers
CAS Number	9004-38-0
ECHA InfoCard	100.130.710
UNII	F2O5O2OI9F
CompTox Dashboard (EPA)	DTXSID2048668

Properties
Chemical formula	Variable
Molar mass	Variable
Appearance	White to off-white solid
- Except where otherwise noted, data are given for materials in their standard state (at 25 °C [77 °F], 100 kPa). Infobox references

Cellulose acetate phthalate (CAP), also known as cellacefate (INN) and cellulosi acetas phthalas, is a commonly used polymer phthalate in the formulation of pharmaceuticals, such as the enteric coating of tablets or capsules and for controlled release formulations. It is a cellulose polymer where about half of the hydroxyls are esterified with acetyls, a quarter are esterified with one or two carboxyls of a phthalic acid, and the remainder are unchanged. It is a hygroscopic white to off-white free-flowing powder, granules, or flakes. It is tasteless and odorless, though may have a weak odor of acetic acid. Its main use in pharmaceutics is with enteric formulations. It can be used together with other coating agents, e.g. ethyl cellulose. Cellulose acetate phthalate is commonly plasticized with diethyl phthalate, a hydrophobic compound, or triethyl citrate, a hydrophilic compound; other compatible plasticizers are various phthalates, triacetin, dibutyl tartrate, glycerol, propylene glycol, tripropionin, triacetin citrate, acetylated monoglycerides, etc.

== Synthesis ==
The most common way to prepare cellulose acetate phthalate consists of the reaction of a partially substituted cellulose acetate (CA) with phthalic anhydride in the presence of an organic solvent and a basic catalyst. The organic solvents widely used as reaction media for the phthaloylation of cellulose acetate are acetic acid, acetone, or pyridine. The basic catalysts employed are anhydrous sodium acetate when using acetic acid, amines when using acetone, and the organic solvent itself when using pyridine as reaction medium.

Malm et al., records the preparation of phthalic acid derivatives of ethyl-cellulose and cellulose acetate without the use of pyridine by substituting sodium acetate as catalyst and acetic acid as a reaction solvent. Phthalyl content of the derivatives produced by this method is inversely dependent on the reaction temperature, although the rate of phthalyl introduction is faster at high temperatures. Phthalyl content also depends on proportions of acetic acid, as a reaction solvent

== Applications ==
CAP has been used for several decades as a pharmaceutical excipient due to its solubility dependent on the pH of the aqueous media. Enteric coatings based on CAP are resistant to acidic gastric fluids, but easily soluble in mildly basic medium of the intestine. The pH sensitive solubility of CAP is mainly determined (as other properties of this mixed ester) by the degree of substitution (DS), namely the average number of substituent groups bound to an anhydroglucose unit (AGU), as well as by the molar ratio (acetyl and phthaloyl groups). These two structural characteristics of the polymer are dependent on the method employed for its synthesis.

== Stability ==
The extinction coefficient of CAP changes during its forced degradation by heat, a fact that will have to be accounted for in pharmaceutical stability studies should it be manufactured as a microbicide active pharmaceutical ingredient.

== Research ==
The potential of CAP to inhibit infections by human immunodeficiency virus type 1 (HIV-1) and several herpes viruses in vitro have been investigated.

According to a 1944 study by Hodge, there was no histological change in rats fed CAP for a year.
