= Sewbo =

Industrial sewing robot

- Manufacturer: Sewbo, Inc.
- Inventor: Jonathan Zornow
- Country: USA
- Type: Robotic sewing system
- Website: sewbo.com

Sewbo is an industrial sewing robot invented by Sewbo, Inc., a company based in Seattle, Washington.

== History ==
The company Sewbo, Inc was founded by Jonathan Zornow in 2015. The robot capable of handling fabric components throughout the entire garment production process. The operation relies on a water-soluble, non-toxic polymer called polyvinyl alcohol, which stiffens the fabric to facilitate manipulation during sewing. Sewbo is currently optimized for producing T-shirts. It can sew a T-shirt from start to the end. The process involves cutting fabric panels, stiffening them with a polymer solution, and feeding them into a sewing machine using a robotic arm equipped with suction cups.
