= Polyvinyl acetate phthalate =

Polymer used in pharmaceuticals

Polyvinyl acetate phthalate (PVAP) is a commonly used polymer phthalate in the formulation of pharmaceuticals, such as the enteric coating of tablets or capsules. It is a vinyl acetate polymer that is partially hydrolyzed and then esterified with phthalic acid. Its main use in pharmaceutics is with enteric formulations and controlled release formulations.

== See also ==
- Cellulose acetate phthalate
