= Polyvinyl alcohol dehydrogenase (cytochrome) =

Class of enzymes

Identifiers
- EC no.: 1.1.2.6

Databases
- IntEnz: IntEnz view
- BRENDA: BRENDA entry
- ExPASy: NiceZyme view
- KEGG: KEGG entry
- MetaCyc: metabolic pathway
- PRIAM: profile
- PDB structures: RCSB PDB PDBe PDBsum
Search
- PMC: articles
- PubMed: articles
- NCBI: proteins

Polyvinyl alcohol dehydrogenase (cytochrome) (EC 1.1.2.6, PVA dehydrogenase, PVADH) is an enzyme with systematic name polyvinyl alcohol:ferricytochrome-c oxidoreductase. This enzyme catalyses the following chemical reaction

polyvinyl alcohol + ferricytochrome c $\rightleftharpoons$ oxidized polyvinyl alcohol + ferrocytochrome c + H^{+}

This enzyme participates in bacterial polyvinyl alcohol degradation.
