= Enteric coating =

Coating added to some oral medications

An enteric coating is a polymer barrier applied to oral medication that prevents its dissolution or disintegration in the gastric environment. This helps by either protecting drugs from the acidity of the stomach, the stomach from the detrimental effects of the drug, or to release the drug after the stomach (usually in the upper tract of the intestine). Some drugs are unstable at the pH of gastric acid and need to be protected from degradation. Enteric coating is also an effective method to obtain drug targeting (such as gastro-resistant drugs). Other drugs such as some anthelmintics may need to reach a high concentration in a specific part of the intestine. Enteric coating may also be used during studies as a research tool to determine drug absorption. Enteric-coated medications pertain to the "delayed action" dosage form category. Tablets, mini-tablets, pellets and granules (usually filled into capsule shells) are the most common enteric-coated dosage forms.

== Description ==
Most enteric coatings work by presenting a surface that is stable at the intensely acidic pH found in the stomach, but breaks down rapidly at a higher pH (alkaline pH). For example, they will not dissolve in the gastric acids of the stomach (pH ~3), but they will in the alkaline (pH 7–9) environment present in the small intestine. The time required for an enteric-coated dosage form to reach the intestine mostly depends on the presence and type of food in the stomach. It varies from 30 minutes up to 7 hours, with an average time of 6 hours. Although some studies indicated that larger sized dosage forms may require additional time for gastric emptying, others suggested that the size, shape, or volume of the tablet possess no significant effects instead. Enteric coated granules emptying rate is, however, less affected by the presence of food and present the more uniform release and reproducible transit time typical of the multiparticulates dispersion.

By preventing the drug from dissolving into the stomach, enteric coating may protect gastric mucosa from the irritating effects of the medication itself. When the drug reaches the neutral or alkaline environment of the intestine, its active ingredients can then dissolve and become available for absorption into the bloodstream. Drugs that have an irritant effect on the stomach, such as aspirin or potassium chloride, can be coated with a substance that will dissolve only in the small intestine. However, enteric coated aspirin may lead to incomplete inhibition of platelets, potentially negating the intended effect for those being treated for vascular disease. Likewise, certain groups of proton pump inhibitors (esomeprazole, omeprazole, pantoprazole and all grouped azoles) are acid-activated. For such drugs, enteric coating added to the formulation tends to avoid activation in the mouth and esophagus.

Materials used for enteric coatings include fatty acids, waxes, shellac, plastics, and plant fibers. Conventional materials used are solutions of film resins. However, as the solvents for such solutions are organic solvents, there is a concern about the toxicity potential of the traces of the residual solvents in the tablet coating.

The first form of gastro-resistant coating was introduced by Unna in 1884 in the form of keratin-coated pills, although it was later discovered that they were not able to withstand gastric digestion. Salol was also used by Ceppi as one of the first forms of enteric coating. However, the first material that was extensively used as enteric coating agent was shellac, since its introduction in 1930. Properly treated or hydrolyzed shellac showed different enteric release properties.

Recently, some companies have begun to apply enteric coatings to fish oil (omega-3 fatty acids) supplements. The coating prevents the fish oil capsules from being digested in the stomach, which has been known to cause gastroesophageal reflux.

Sometimes the abbreviation "EC" is added beside the name of the drug to indicate that it has an enteric coating.

== Composition ==
- Methyl acrylate-methacrylic acid copolymers
- Cellulose acetate phthalate (CAP)
- Cellulose acetate succinate
- Hydroxypropyl methyl cellulose phthalate
- Hydroxypropyl methyl cellulose acetate succinate (hypromellose acetate succinate)
- Polyvinyl acetate phthalate (PVAP)
- Methyl methacrylate-methacrylic acid copolymers
- Shellac
- Cellulose acetate trimellitate
- Sodium alginate
- Zein
- enteric coating aqueous solution (ethylcellulose, medium chain triglycerides [coconut], oleic acid, sodium alginate, stearic acid) (coated softgels)

== See also ==
- Phthalates
