= Polyvinyl acetate =

Adhesive used for porous materials

- Polyvinyl acetate

Names
- IUPAC name Poly[1-(acetyloxy)ethylene]
- Other names PVAc, PVA, Poly(ethenyl ethanoate), Poly(ethenyl acetate)

Identifiers
| CAS Number | 9003-20-7 |
| 3D model (JSmol) | Interactive image |
| ChemSpider | none |
| ECHA InfoCard | 100.108.147 |
| KEGG | C12282 |
| PubChem CID | 7758 |
| UNII | 32K497ZK2U |
| CompTox Dashboard (EPA) | DTXSID3051258 |
- SMILES: O([C@@H](C*)*)C(C)=O

Properties
| Chemical formula | (C_{4}H_{6}O_{2})_{n} |
| Molar mass | 86.09 g/mol per unit |
| Density | 1.19 g/cm^{3} (25 °C) |

Hazards
| Safety data sheet (SDS) | MSDS |
- Except where otherwise noted, data are given for materials in their standard state (at 25 °C [77 °F], 100 kPa). verify (what is ?) Infobox references

Polyvinyl acetate (PVA, PVAc, poly(ethenyl ethanoate)), commonly known as wood glue (a term that may also refer to other types of glues), PVA glue, white glue, carpenter's glue, school glue, or Elmer's Glue in the United States, is a widely available adhesive used for porous materials like wood, paper, and cloth. An aliphatic rubbery synthetic polymer with the formula (C_{4}H_{6}O_{2})_{n}, it belongs to the polyvinyl ester family, with the general formula −[RCOOCHCH_{2}]−. It is a type of thermoplastic.

== Properties ==
The degree of polymerization of polyvinyl acetate is typically 100 to 5000, while its ester groups are sensitive to base hydrolysis and slowly convert PVAc into polyvinyl alcohol and acetic acid.

The glass transition temperature of polyvinyl acetate is between 30 and 45 °C depending on the molecular weight.

PVAc dispersions such as Elmer's Glue-All contain polyvinyl alcohol as a protective colloid. In alkaline conditions, boron compounds such as boric acid or borax cause the polyvinyl alcohol to cross-link, forming tackifying precipitates or toys, such as Slime and Flubber.

A number of microorganisms can degrade polyvinyl acetate. Most commonly, damage is caused by filamentous fungi; however, algae, yeasts, lichens, and bacteria can also degrade polyvinyl acetate.

== Discovery ==
Polyvinyl acetate was discovered in Germany in 1912 by Fritz Klatte.

The monomer, vinyl acetate, was first produced on an industrial scale by the addition of acetic acid to acetylene in the presence of a mercury(I) salt acting as a catalyst, but it is now primarily made by palladium-catalyzed oxidative addition of acetic acid to ethylene.

== Preparation ==
PVA is a vinyl polymer. Polyvinyl acetate is prepared by the polymerization of vinyl acetate monomer (free-radical vinyl polymerization of the monomer vinyl acetate).

== Applications ==
As a dispersion in water (usually an emulsion), PVAc preparations are used as adhesives for porous materials, particularly for wood, paper, and cloth, and as a consolidant for porous building stone, in particular sandstone. PVAc is considered a food-safe material, and is thus used often in such applications (e.g., in food packaging material).

Uses:

- As wood glue, PVAc is known as "white glue" and the yellow as "carpenter's glue".
- As paper adhesive during paper packaging conversion.
- In bookbinding and book arts, due to its flexible strong bond and non-acidic nature (unlike many other polymers). The use of PVAc on the Archimedes Palimpsest during the 20th century greatly hindered the task of disbinding the book and preserving and imaging the pages in the early 21st century, in part because the glue was stronger than the parchment it held together.
- In handicrafts.
- As envelope adhesive.
- As wallpaper adhesive.
- As a primer for drywall and other substrates.
- As a gum base in chewing gum.
- As an adhesive for cigarette paper.
- As the coating layer on Gouda cheese.

The stiff homopolymer PVAc, but mostly the softer copolymer, a combination of vinyl acetate and ethylene, vinyl acetate ethylene (VAE), is also used in paper coatings, paint and other industrial coatings, as a binder in nonwovens in glass fibers, sanitary napkins, filter paper and in textile finishing.

Polyvinyl acetate is also the raw material to make other polymers like:

- Polyvinyl alcohol −[HOCHCH_{2}]−: Polyvinyl acetate is partially or completely hydrolysed to give polyvinyl alcohol. This reversible saponification and esterification reaction was a strong hint for Hermann Staudinger in the formulation of his theory of macromolecules.
- Polyvinyl acetate phthalate (PVAP): Polyvinyl acetate is partially hydrolyzed and then esterified with phthalic acid.

== See also ==
- Ethylene vinyl acetate
- International Klein Blue
- Elmer's Products
