= Vinyl propionate =

Names
- Preferred IUPAC name Ethenyl propanoate
- Other names Vinyl propanoate

Identifiers
CAS Number	105-38-4
3D model (JSmol)	Interactive image
ChemSpider	7464
ECHA InfoCard	100.002.994
EC Number	203-293-5
PubChem CID	7750
UNII	2437OJ3190
CompTox Dashboard (EPA)	DTXSID9051537
- InChI: InChI=1S/C5H8O2/c1-3-5(6)7-4-2/h4H,2-3H2,1H3 Key: UIWXSTHGICQLQT-UHFFFAOYSA-N
- SMILES: CCC(=O)OC=C

Properties
Chemical formula	C_{5}H_{8}O_{2}
Molar mass	100.117 g·mol^{−1}
Appearance	colorless liquid
Density	0.917 g/cm3 (20 °C)
Boiling point	95 °C (203 °F; 368 K)
Solubility in water	6.5 mL/L

Hazards
- GHS labelling
Pictograms	(GHS02: Flammable) (GHS07: Exclamation mark)
Signal word	Danger
Hazard statements	H225, H315, H319
Precautionary statements	P210, P233, P240, P241, P242, P243, P264, P280, P302+P352, P303+P361+P353, P305+P351+P338, P321, P332+P313, P337+P313, P362, P370+P378, P403+P235, P501
Flash point	−2 °C (28 °F; 271 K)
- Except where otherwise noted, data are given for materials in their standard state (at 25 °C [77 °F], 100 kPa). Infobox references

Vinyl propionate is the organic compound with the formula CH_{3}CH_{2}CO_{2}CH=CH_{2}. This colorless liquid is the ester of propionic acid and vinyl alcohol. It is used to produce poly(vinyl propionate) as well as copolymers with acrylate esters, vinyl chloride, and vinyl acetate, some of which are used in paints. The compound resembles vinyl acetate.

Since vinyl alcohol is not available, vinyl propionate is produced by the addition of propionic acid to acetylene. The reaction is catalyzed by carbon and zinc salts.
