= Ethylidene diacetate =

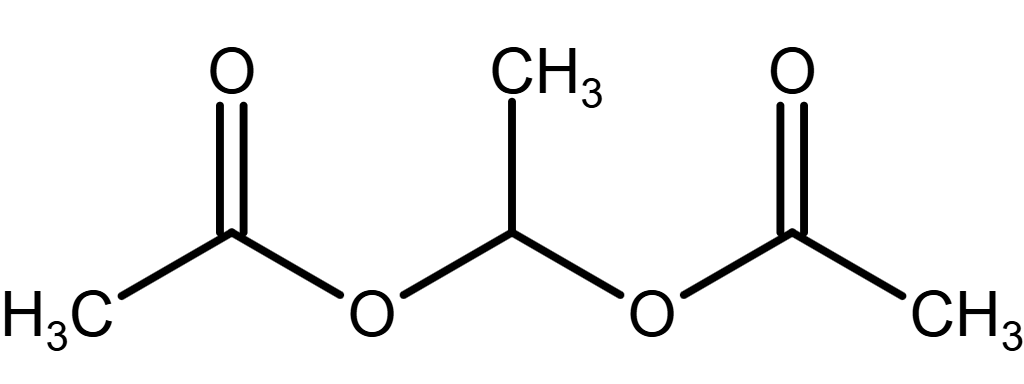

Names
- Preferred IUPAC name Ethane-1,1-diyl diacetate
- Other names 1,1-Diacetoxyethane; 1,1-Ethanediol diacetate

Identifiers
CAS Number	542-10-9
3D model (JSmol)	Interactive image
ChemSpider	21106538
ECHA InfoCard	100.008.001
PubChem CID	222536
UNII	KL1S8V6W25
CompTox Dashboard (EPA)	DTXSID1027188
- InChI: InChI=1S/C6H10O4/c1-4(7)9-6(3)10-5(2)8/h6H,1-3H3 Key: ACKALUBLCWJVNB-UHFFFAOYSA-N; InChI=1/C6H10O4/c1-4(7)9-6(3)10-5(2)8/h6H,1-3H3 Key: ACKALUBLCWJVNB-UHFFFAOYAU
- SMILES: CC(OC(=O)C)OC(=O)C

Properties
Chemical formula	C_{6}H_{10}O_{4}
Molar mass	146.14
Appearance	Colorless liquid
Odor	Sweet, fruity
Density	1.07 g/cm^{3}
Melting point	18.9 °C (66.0 °F; 292.0 K)
Boiling point	167–169 °C (333–336 °F; 440–442 K)
- Except where otherwise noted, data are given for materials in their standard state (at 25 °C [77 °F], 100 kPa). Infobox references

Ethylidene diacetate is an organic compound with the formula (CH_{3}CO_{2})_{2}CHCH_{3}. It is a colorless liquid with a sweet, fruity odor. Ethylidene diacetate once served as a precursor to vinyl acetate, a valued monomer.

== Preparation ==
A major industrial route involves the reaction of acetaldehyde and acetic anhydride in the presence of a ferric chloride catalyst:

CH_{3}CHO + (CH_{3}CO)_{2}O → (CH_{3}CO_{2})_{2}CHCH_{3}

It can be converted to the valuable monomer vinyl acetate by thermal elimination of acetic acid:

(CH_{3}CO_{2})_{2}CHCH_{3} → CH_{3}CO_{2}CH=CH_{2} + CH_{3}CO_{2}H
