= Polyvinyl ester =

Polyvinyl esters:
General formula
(R = CH_{3}; CH_{2}Cl; C_{2}H_{5} etc.)

Polyvinyl esters are a group of thermoplastic vinyl polymers. The most important examples of this group are polyvinyl acetate (PVAC) and polyvinyl propionate.

== Production ==
The radical polymerization of vinyl ester 1 (e.g. in case of vinyl acetate; R = CH_{3}) yields polyvinyl ester 2:

Synthese der Polyvinylester

== Use ==
The transparent polymers are used for the production of lacquers and as adhesives. The hydrolytic cleavage of the ester bonds of vinyl acetate is of industrial significance.
