= Polyvinyl chloride acetate =

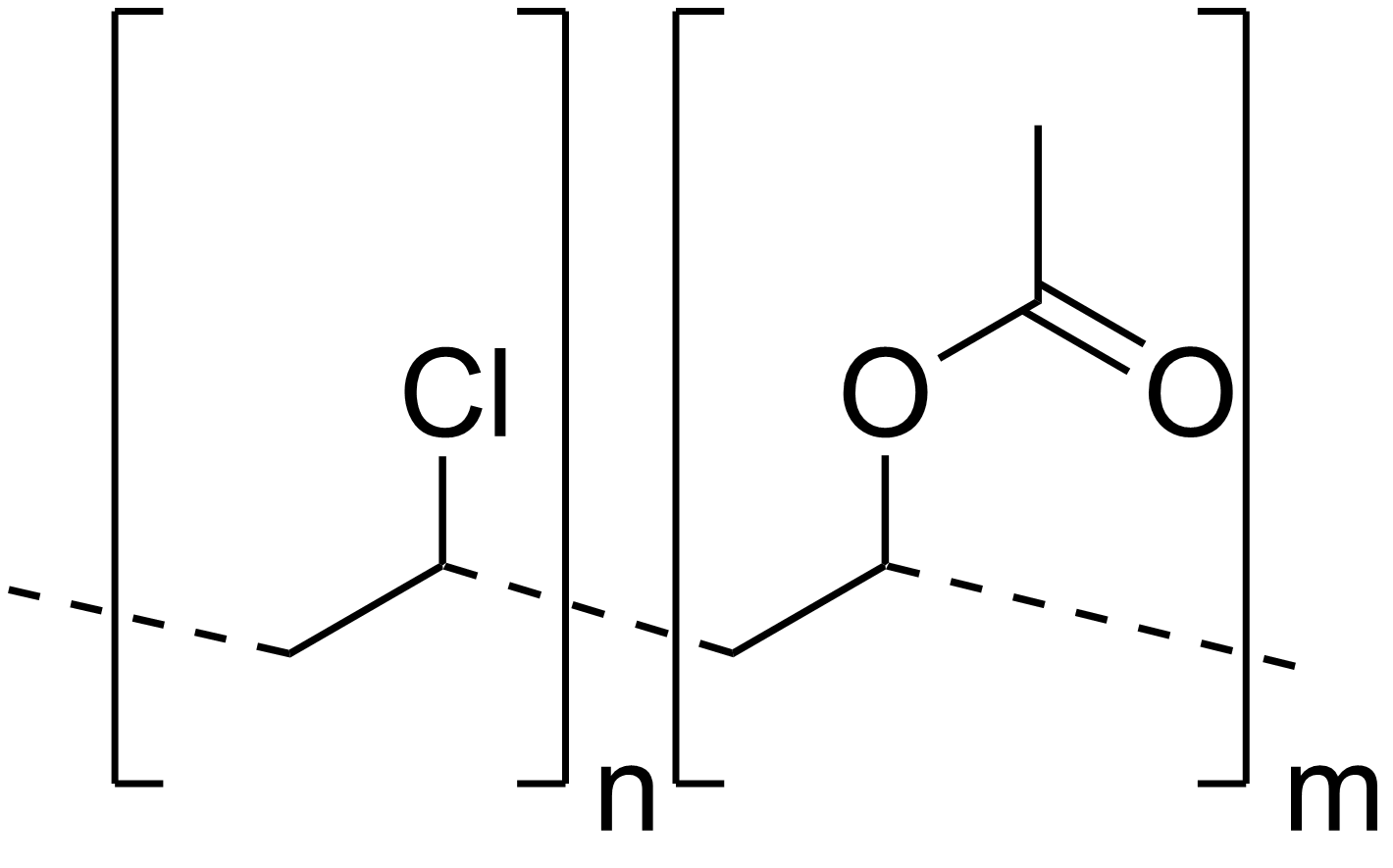

Identifiers
CAS Number	9003-22-9
ChemSpider	none
ECHA InfoCard	100.108.382
CompTox Dashboard (EPA)	DTXSID30895103

Properties
Chemical formula	(C_{2}H_{3}Cl)_{n}(C_{4}H_{6}O_{2})_{m}
Molar mass	Variable
Appearance	Colorless solid
- Except where otherwise noted, data are given for materials in their standard state (at 25 °C [77 °F], 100 kPa). verify (what is ?) Infobox references

Polyvinyl chloride acetate (PVCA) is a thermoplastic copolymer of vinyl chloride and vinyl acetate. It is used in the manufacture of electrical insulation, of protective coverings (including garments), and of credit cards and "vinyl" audio recordings.
