= Embolization =

Passage and lodging of an embolus within the bloodstream

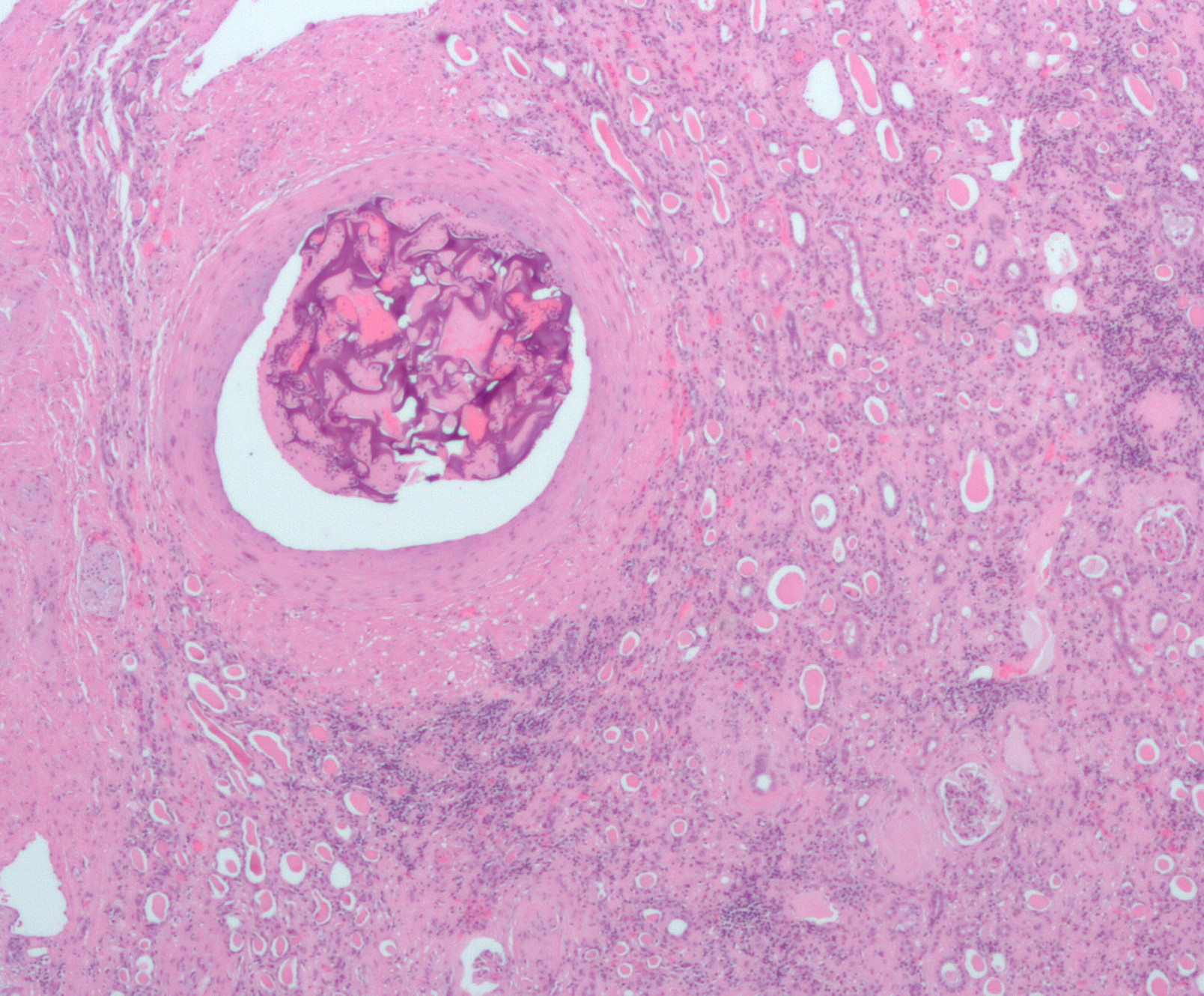
- Micrograph of embolic material in the artery of a kidney. The kidney was surgically removed because of cancer. H&E stain.

Embolization refers to the passage and lodging of an embolus within the bloodstream. It may be of natural origin (pathological), in which sense it is also called embolism, for example a pulmonary embolism; or it may be artificially induced (therapeutic), as a hemostatic treatment for bleeding or as a treatment for some types of cancer of deliberately blocking blood vessels to starve the tumor cells.

In the cancer management application, the embolus, besides blocking the blood supply to the tumor, also often includes an ingredient to attack the tumor chemically or with irradiation. When it bears a chemotherapy drug, the process is called chemoembolization. Transcatheter arterial chemoembolization (TACE) is the usual form. When the embolus bears a radiopharmaceutical for unsealed source radiotherapy, the process is called radioembolization or selective internal radiation therapy (SIRT).

== Uses ==
Embolization involves the selective occlusion of blood vessels by purposely introducing emboli, in other words deliberately blocking a blood vessel. Embolization is used to treat a wide variety of conditions affecting different organs of the human body.

Embolization is commonly used to treat active arterial bleeding. Embolization is rarely used to treat venous bleeding as venous bleeding can stop on its own or with packing or compression.

=== Bleeding ===
The treatment is used to occlude:

- Recurrent coughing up of blood
- Cerebral aneurysm
- Gastrointestinal bleeding
- Nosebleed
- Varicocele
- Primary post-partum bleeding
- Surgical bleeding
- Traumatic bleeding such as splenic rupture or pelvic fracture

=== Growths ===
The treatment is used to slow or stop blood supply thus reducing the size of the tumour:

- Kidney lesions
- Liver lesions, typically hepatocellular carcinoma (HCC). Treated either by particle infarction or transcatheter arterial chemoembolization (TACE).
- Uterine fibroids
- Arteriovenous malformations (AVMs)
- Arteriovenous fistula
- Juvenile Nasopharyngeal Angiofibroma

=== Malignant hypertension ===
It could be useful for managing malignant hypertension due to end stage kidney failure.

=== Other ===
- Portal vein embolization prior to liver resection.

== Technique ==
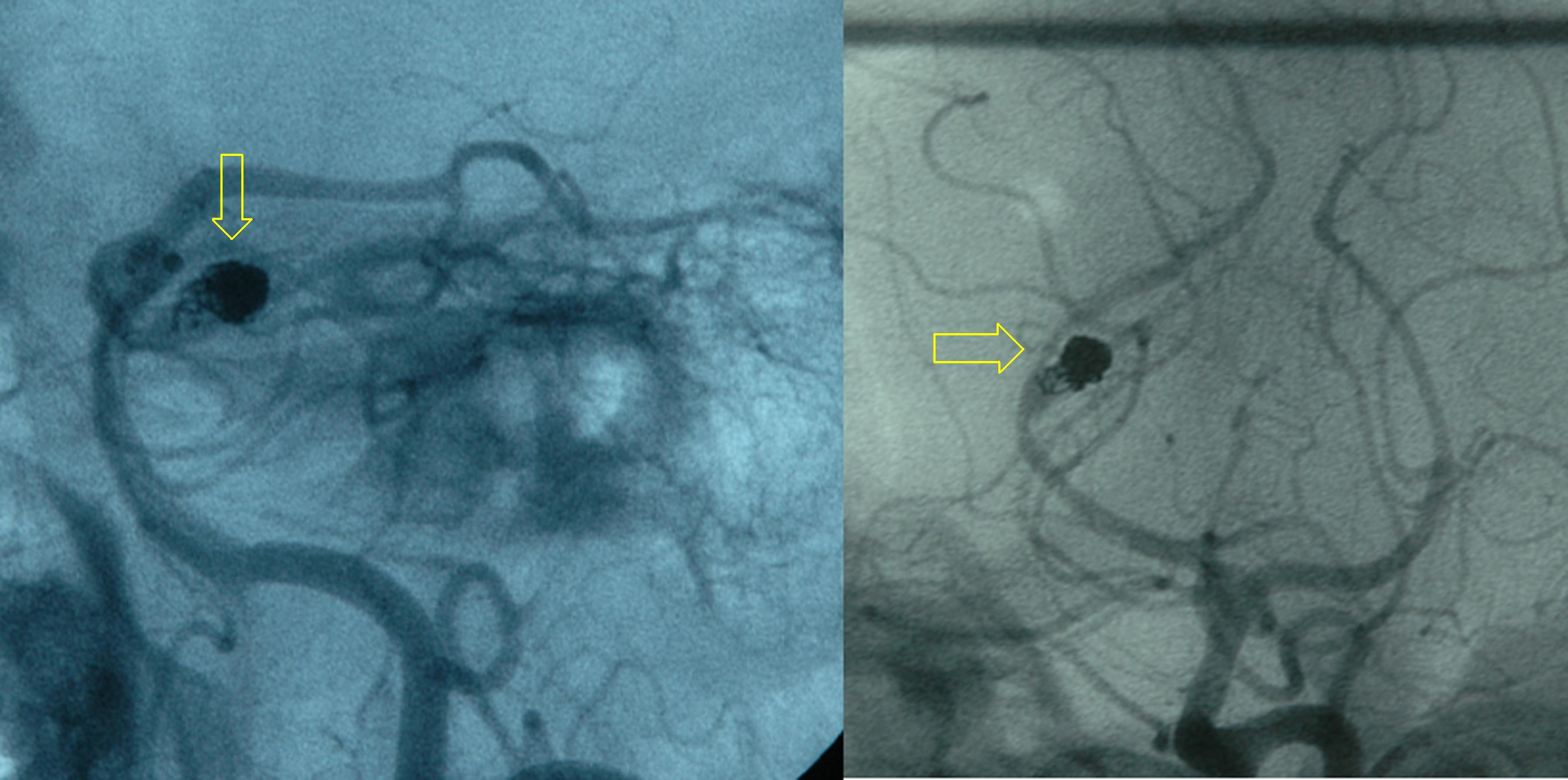
Post-embolization arteriogram showing coiled aneurysm (indicated by yellow arrows) of the posterior cerebral artery with a residual aneurysmal sac

First developed by Sadek Hilal in 1968, embolization is a minimally invasive surgical technique. The purpose is to prevent blood flow to an area of the body, which can effectively shrink a tumor or block an aneurysm.

The procedure is carried out as an endovascular procedure by an interventional radiologist in an interventional suite. It is common for most patients to have the treatment carried out with little or no sedation, although this depends largely on the organ to be embolized. Patients who undergo cerebral embolization or portal vein embolization are usually given a general anesthetic.

Access to the organ in question is acquired by means of a guidewire and catheter(s). Depending on the organ this can be very difficult and time-consuming. The position of the correct artery or vein supplying the pathology in question is located by digital subtraction angiography (DSA). These images are then used as a map for the radiologist to gain access to the correct vessel by selecting an appropriate catheter and or wire, depending on the 'shape' of the surrounding anatomy.

Once in place, the treatment can begin. The artificial embolus used is usually one of the following:

- Coils: Guglielmi Detachable Coil or Hydrocoil
- Particles
- Foam
- Plug
- Microspheres or Beads

Once the artificial emboli have been successfully introduced, another set of DSA images are taken to confirm a successful deployment.

== Agents ==
Liquid embolic agents – Used for AVM, these agents can flow through complex vascular structures so the surgeon does not need to target the catheter to every single vessel.

- Butyl cyanoacrylate (NBCA) – This material is approved by FDA in 2000 for embolisation of cerebral arteriovenous malformation. When exposed to an environment containing anions such as blood or water, it polymerises quickly. Catheters should be flushed with dextrose 5% to prevent premature polymerisation within the catheter. NBCA completely occludes vessels and is permanent. However, the polymerisation can spread distally or proximally of the intended location.
- ethiodol – Made from iodine and poppyseed oil, this is a highly viscous agent. It is usually used for chemoembolizations, especially for hepatomas, since these tumors absorb iodine. The half-life is five days, so it only temporarily embolizes vessels.
- Ethylene Vinyl Alcohol Copolymer, soluted in Dimethyl-Sulfoxide (DMSO) under the trade name Onyx. Depending on the desired character of the liquid, the concentration can be varied: For example, 6% EVOH (trade name Onyx 18) or 8% EVOH (trade name Onyx 34). Micronized tantalum powder is added in order to maintain Radiopacity.

Sclerosing agents – These will harden the endothelial lining of vessels. They require more time to react than the liquid embolic agents. Therefore, they cannot be used for large or high-flow vessels.

- ethanol – This permanent agent is very good for treating AVM. The alcohol does need some time to denature proteins of the endothelium and activate the coagulation system to cause a blood clot. Therefore, some surgeons will use a balloon occlusion catheter to stop the blood flow and allow time for ethanol to work. Ethanol is toxic to the system in large quantities and may cause compartment syndrome. In addition, the injections are painful.
- ethanolamine oleate – This permanent agent is used for sclerosing esophageal varices. It contains 2% benzyl alcohol, so it is less painful than ethanol. However it does cause hemolysis and kidney failure in large doses.
- sotradecol – This agent is used for superficial lower extremity varicose veins. It has been around for a very long time and is a proven remedy. However, it does cause hyperpigmentation of the region in 30% of patients. It is less painful than ethanol.

Particulate embolic agents – These are only used for precapillary arterioles or small arteries. These are also very good for AVM deep within the body. The disadvantage is that they are not easily targeted in the vessel. None of these are radioopaque, so they are difficult to view with radiologic imaging unless they are soaked in contrast prior to injection.

- Gelfoam hemostasis – It is made of animal-derived gelatin and is shaped into a sponge-like form. It can be made into a paste applied over a surface or made into small particles that can be injected via syringe. Gelfoam sheets can be cut into 1–3 mm pledgets, mixed with contrast materials for embolization. Gelfoam temporarily occludes blood vessels for 3 to 6 weeks. Each particle sized from 10 to 100 micrometers. Gelfoam use is associated with small risk of infection due to trapped air bubbles.
- polyvinyl alcohol (PVA) – These are permanent agents. They are tiny balls 50–1200 um in size. The particles are not meant to mechanically occlude a vessel. Instead they cause an inflammatory reaction. Unfortunately, they have a tendency to clump together since the balls are not perfectly round. The clump can separate a few days later, failing as an embolic agent.
- Embolization microspheres – These are superior permanent or resorbable particulate embolic agents available in different well-calibrated size ranges for precise occlusion. Embolization microspheres may comprise additional functionality such as drug loading and elution capability, specific mechanical properties, imageability or radioactivity

Mechanical occlusion devices – These fit in all vessels. They also have the advantage of accuracy of location; they are deployed exactly where the catheter ends.

- coils – These are used for AVF, aneurysms, or trauma. They are very good for fast-flowing vessels because they immediately clot the vessel. They are made from platinum or stainless steel. They induce clots due to the Dacron wool tails around the wire. The coil itself will not cause mechanical occlusion. Since it is made of metal, it is easily seen in radiographic images. The disadvantage is that large coils can disrupt the radiographic image. The coil may also lose its shape if the catheter is kinked. Also, there is a small risk of dislodging from the deployed location.
- detachable balloon – Treats AVF and aneurysms. These balloons are simply implanted in a target vessel, then filled with saline through a one-way valve. The blood stops and endothelium grows around the balloon until the vessel fibroses. The balloon may be hypertonic relative to blood and hence rupture and fail, or it may be hypotonic and shrink, migrating to a new location.

== Advantages ==
- Minimally invasive
- No scarring
- Minimal risk of infection
- No or rare use of general anesthetic
- Faster recovery time
- High success rate compared to other procedures
- Preserves fertility and anatomical integrity

== Disadvantages ==
- User dependent success rate
- Risk of emboli reaching healthy tissue potentially causing gastric, stomach or duodenal ulcers. There are methods, techniques and devices that decrease the occurrence of this type of adverse side effect.
- Not suitable for everyone
- Recurrence more likely

== See also ==
- Endovascular surgery
- Gastrointestinal bleeding
- Interventional radiology
