= Forced degradation =

Forced degradation or accelerated degradation is a process whereby the natural degradation rate of a product or material is increased by the application of an additional stress.

== Introduction ==
Forced degradation studies are used to identify reactions which may occur to degrade a processed product. Usually conducted before final formulation, forced degradation uses external stresses to rapidly screen material stabilities.

Longer-term storage tests are usually used to measure similar properties when final formulations are involved because of the stringent FDA regulations. These tests are generally more expensive (because of the time involved) than forced degradation which is therefore used for rapid selection and elimination tests.

== Common stresses ==
There are a number of common stresses which are used to

- pH (acid/base)

Chemical processes are often catalysed by the presence of acids and bases. The exposure of materials to these can therefore accelerate degradation reactions.

- Temperature

In accordance to arrhenius kinetics, increasing temperature increases the rate of any degradation process. Temperature is often used in conjunction with other stresses to increase reaction rates.

- Oxidation
- Concentration
- Light

== Methodologies ==
Standard methodologies include:

- Wet chemistry methods
- Flow chemistry
- Calor

== Application ==
- To demonstrate the specificity when developing stability indicating method.
- To help to identify reactions that cause degradation of pharmaceutical product.
- As a part of method development strategy.
- Are designed to generate product related variants.

== See also ==
- Chemical decomposition
- Thermogravimetric analysis
- Total productive maintenance
