= Onyx (interventional radiology) =

In interventional radiology, Onyx is a trade name for a copolymer used for embolisation therapy, which involves the occlusion of blood vessels. It is a liquid embolic agent. Onyx is produced and sold by Medtronic (previously Covidien, which acquired ev3 Inc., the original developer of Onyx, in 2010).

== Components ==
Onyx consists of Ethylene Vinyl Alcohol Copolymer, soluted in Dimethyl-Sulfoxide (DMSO). Depending on the desired character of the liquid, the concentration can be varied: For example, 6% EVOH (trade name Onyx 18) or 8% EVOH (trade name Onyx 34). Micronized tantalum powder is added in order to maintain Radiopacity.

== Approval ==
Onyx was approved as 'Humanitarian Use Device (HUD)' for the treatment of saccular aneurysms that are not surgically removable by the Food and Drug Administration (FDA) in the United States on April 11, 2007.
