= Triethyl citrate =

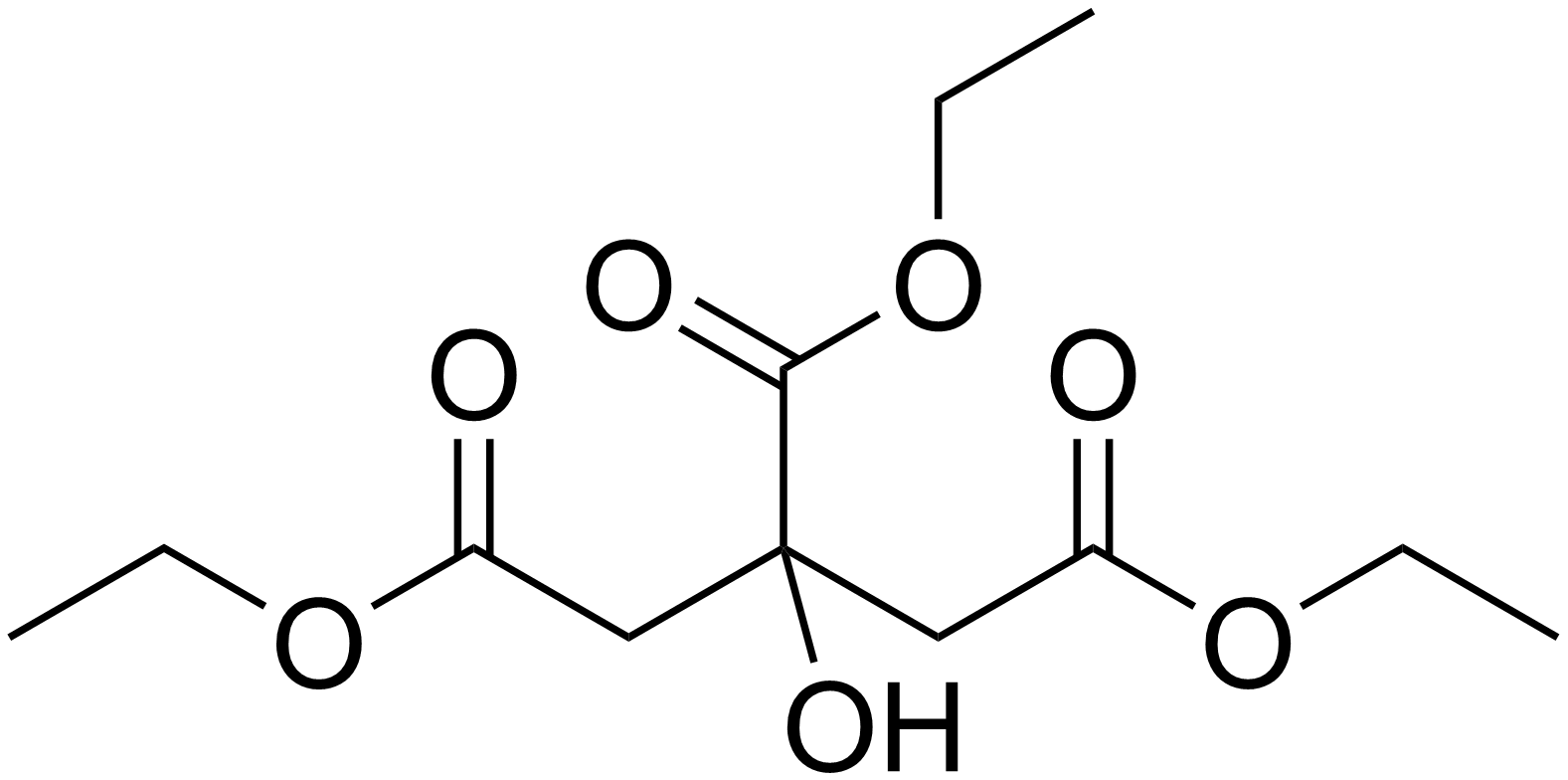

Names
- Preferred IUPAC name Triethyl 2-hydroxypropane-1,2,3-tricarboxylate
- Other names: Ethyl citrate; E1505; Citric acid ethyl ester; Triethyl citrate

Identifiers
CAS Number	77-93-0
3D model (JSmol)	Interactive image
ChEMBL	ChEMBL464988
ChemSpider	13850879
ECHA InfoCard	100.000.974
EC Number	201-070-7
E number	E1505 (additional chemicals)
PubChem CID	6506
UNII	8Z96QXD6UM
CompTox Dashboard (EPA)	DTXSID0040701
- InChI: InChI=1S/C12H20O7/c1-4-17-9(13)7-12(16,11(15)19-6-3)8-10(14)18-5-2/h16H,4-8H2,1-3H3 Key: DOOTYTYQINUNNV-UHFFFAOYSA-N; InChI=1/C12H20O7/c1-4-17-9(13)7-12(16,11(15)19-6-3)8-10(14)18-5-2/h16H,4-8H2,1-3H3 Key: DOOTYTYQINUNNV-UHFFFAOYAG
- SMILES: CCOC(=O)CC(CC(=O)OCC)(C(=O)OCC)O

Properties
Chemical formula	C_{12}H_{20}O_{7}
Molar mass	276.283 g/mol
Appearance	Oily liquid
Density	1.137 g/mL at 25 °C
Melting point	−55 °C (−67 °F; 218 K)
Boiling point	294 °C (561 °F; 567 K) at 1 atm 235 °C at 150 mmHg
Solubility in water	65 g/L
Magnetic susceptibility (χ)	−161.9·10^{−6} cm^{3}/mol
- Except where otherwise noted, data are given for materials in their standard state (at 25 °C [77 °F], 100 kPa). verify (what is ?) Infobox references

Triethyl citrate is an ester of citric acid. It is a colorless, odorless liquid used as a food additive, emulsifier and solvent (E number E1505) to stabilize foams, especially as whipping aid for egg white. It is also used in pharmaceutical coatings and plastics.

Triethyl citrate is also used as a plasticizer for polyvinyl chloride (PVC) and similar plastics.

Triethyl citrate has been used as a pseudo-emulsifier in e-cigarette juices. It functions essentially like lecithin used in food products, but with the possibility of vaporization which lecithin does not have.
