= Vinyl polymer =

Group of polymers derived from vinyl monomers

In polymer chemistry, vinyl polymers are a group of polymers derived from substituted vinyl (H_{2}C=CHR) monomers. Their backbone is an extended alkane chain [−CH_{2}−CHR−]. In popular usage, "vinyl" refers only to polyvinyl chloride (PVC).

== Examples ==
Vinyl polymers are the most common type of plastic. Important examples can be distinguished by the R group in the monomer H_{2}C=CHR:

- Polyethylene (PE) is made from ethylene, R = H
- polypropylene (PP) is made from propylene, R = CH_{3}
- Polystyrene (PS) is made from styrene, R = C_{6}H_{5}
- Polyvinyl chloride (PVC) is made from vinyl chloride, R = Cl
- Polyvinyl acetate (PVAc) is made from vinyl acetate, R = O_{2}CCH_{3}
- Polyacrylonitrile (PAN) is made from acrylonitrile, R = CN

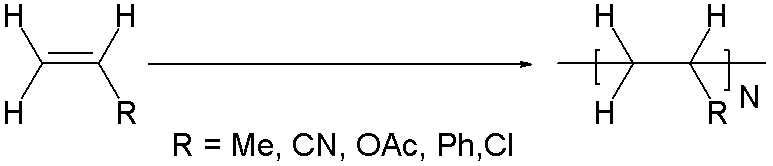

== Production ==
Vinyl polymers are produced using catalysts. Ziegler–Natta catalysts are used commercially for production of polyethylene and polypropylene. Many are produced using radical initiators which are produced from organic peroxides. Still others (polystyrene) are produced using anionic initiators such as butyl lithium.

An exception from the usual rules, polyvinyl alcohol, (CH_{2}CHOH)_{n}, is produced by hydrolysis of polyvinyl acetate. Vinyl alcohol is not sufficiently stable to undergo polymerization.

== Structure ==
Vinyl polymers are subject of several structural variations, which greatly expands the range of polymers and their applications.

With the exception of polyethylene, vinyl polymers can arise from head-to-tail linking of monomers, head-to-head combined with tail-to-tail, or a mixture of those two patterns. Additionally the substituted carbon center in such polymers is stereogenic (a "chiral center"), with the result that the relative absolute configurations of these centers within a polymer can influence the properties of the polymer. This feature is called tacticity. The polymerization conditions and the catalysts affect tacticity.

Another major variation for vinyl polymers arises from the copolymerization of differing vinyl monomers. The simplest example is ethylene-propylene copolymer. The % comonomer is yet another variation.

== See also ==
- Acrylate polymer
