= Polyvinyl alcohol =

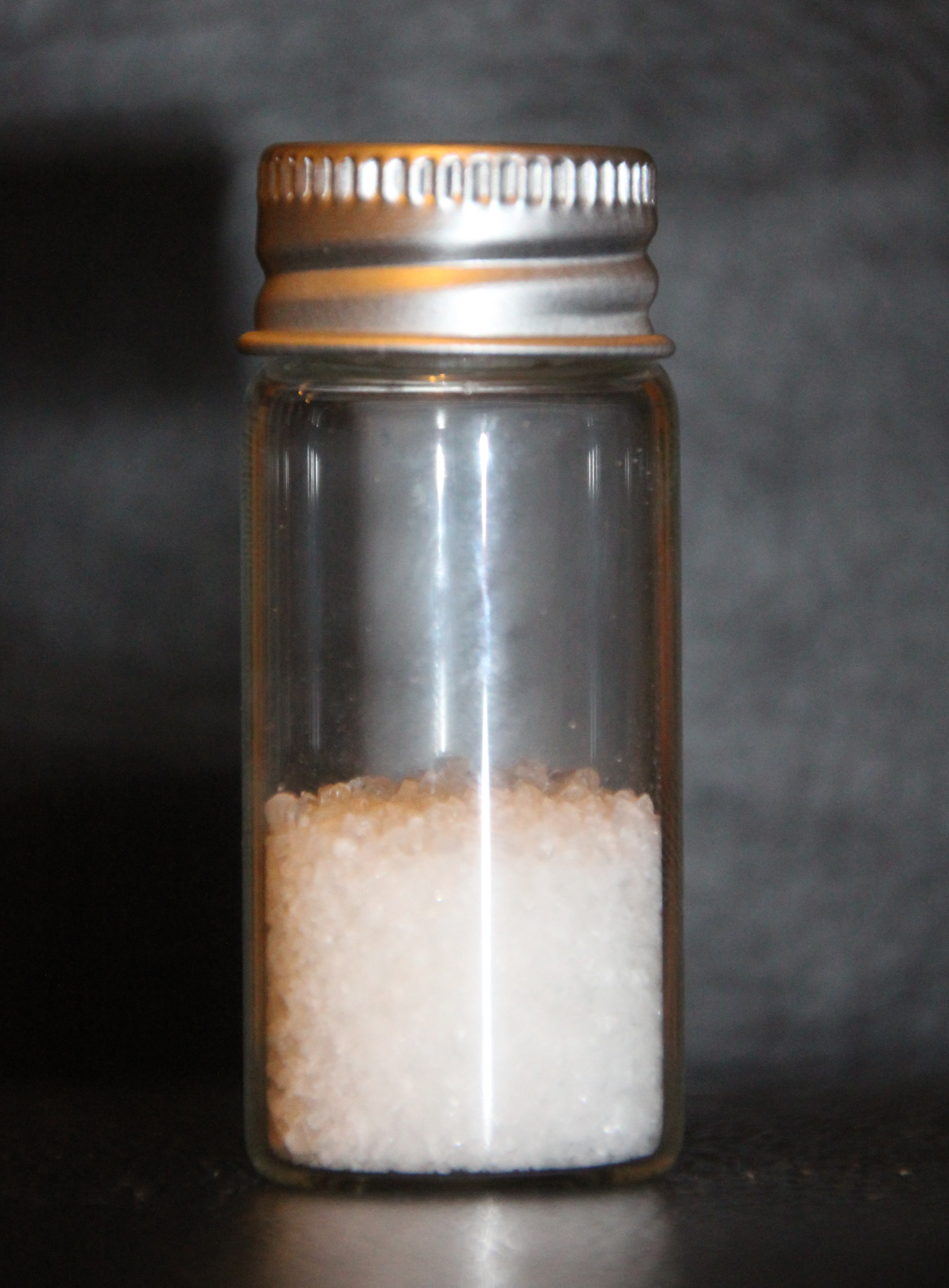

Names
- Other names PVOH; Poly(Ethenol), Ethenol, homopolymer; PVA; Polyviol; Vinol; Alvyl; Alcotex; Covol; Gelvatol; Lemol; Mowiol; Mowiflex, Alcotex, Elvanol, Gelvatol, Lemol, Nelfilcon A, Polyviol und Rhodoviol

Identifiers
CAS Number	9002-89-5
ChEMBL	ChEMBL76101
ChemSpider	none
ECHA InfoCard	100.121.648
E number	E1203 (additional chemicals)
KEGG	C00980
RTECS number	TR8100000
UNII	1E30GE2EF7
CompTox Dashboard (EPA)	DTXSID4031930

Properties
Chemical formula	(C_{2}H_{4}O)_{x}
Density	1.19–1.31 g/cm^{3}
Melting point	200 °C (392 °F; 473 K)
Refractive index (n_{D})	1.477 @ 632 nm

Hazards
NFPA 704 (fire diamond)	0 1 0
Flash point	79.44 °C (174.99 °F; 352.59 K)
- Lethal dose or concentration (LD, LC)
LD_{50} (median dose)	14,700 mg/kg (mouse)
Safety data sheet (SDS)	External MSDS
- Except where otherwise noted, data are given for materials in their standard state (at 25 °C [77 °F], 100 kPa). verify (what is ?) Infobox references

Polyvinyl alcohol (PVOH, PVA, or PVAl) is a water-soluble synthetic polymer. It has the idealized formula [CH_{2}CH(OH)]_{n}. It is used in papermaking, textile warp sizing, as a thickener and emulsion stabilizer in polyvinyl acetate (PVAc) adhesive formulations, in a variety of coatings, and 3D printing. It is colourless (white) and odorless. It is commonly supplied as beads or as solutions in water. Without an externally added crosslinking agent, PVA solution can be gelled through repeated freezing-thawing, yielding highly strong, ultrapure, biocompatible hydrogels which have been used for a variety of applications, such as vascular stents, cartilages, contact lenses, etc.

Although polyvinyl alcohol is often referred to by the acronym PVA, more generally PVA refers to polyvinyl acetate, which is commonly used as a wood adhesive and sealer.

== Uses ==
PVA is used in a variety of medical applications because of its biocompatibility, low tendency for protein adhesion, and low toxicity. Specific uses include cartilage replacements, contact lenses, laundry detergent pods and eye drops. Polyvinyl alcohol is used as an aid in suspension polymerizations. Its largest application in China is its use as a protective colloid to make PVAc dispersions. In Japan its major use is the production of Vinylon fiber. This fiber is also manufactured in North Korea for self-sufficiency reasons, because no oil is required to produce it. Another application is photographic film.

PVA-based polymers are used widely in additive manufacturing. For example, 3D printed oral dosage forms demonstrate great potential in the pharmaceutical industry. It is possible to create drug-loaded tablets with modified drug-release characteristics where PVA is used as a binder substance.

Medically, PVA-based microparticles have received FDA 510(k) approval to be used as embolisation particles to be used for peripheral hypervascular tumors. It may also used as the embolic agent in a Uterine Fibroid Embolectomy (UFE). In biomedical engineering research, PVA has also been studied for cartilage, orthopaedic applications, and potential materials for vascular graft.

PVA is commonly used in household sponges that absorb more water than polyurethane sponges.

PVA may be used as an adhesive during preparation of stool samples for microscopic examination in pathology.

=== Polyvinyl acetals ===
Polyvinyl acetals are prepared by treating PVA with aldehydes. Butyraldehyde and formaldehyde afford polyvinyl butyral (PVB) and polyvinyl formal (PVF), respectively. Preparation of polyvinyl butyral is the largest use for polyvinyl alcohol in the US and Western Europe.

== Preparation ==
Unlike most vinyl polymers, PVA is not prepared by polymerization of the corresponding monomer, since the monomer, vinyl alcohol, is thermodynamically unstable with respect to its tautomerization to acetaldehyde. Instead, PVA is prepared by hydrolysis of polyvinyl acetate, or sometimes other vinyl ester-derived polymers with formate or chloroacetate groups instead of acetate. The conversion of the polyvinyl esters is usually conducted by base-catalysed transesterification with ethanol:

[CH_{2}CH(OAc)]_{n} + C_{2}H_{5}OH → [CH_{2}CH(OH)]_{n} + C_{2}H_{5}OAc

The properties of the polymer are affected by the degree of transesterification.

Worldwide consumption of polyvinyl alcohol was over one million metric tons in 2006.

== Structure and properties ==
PVA is an atactic material that exhibits crystallinity. In terms of microstructure, it is composed mainly of 1,3-diol linkages [−CH_{2}−CH(OH)−CH_{2}−CH(OH)−], but a few percent of 1,2-diols [−CH_{2}−CH(OH)−CH(OH)−CH_{2}−] occur, depending on the conditions for the polymerization of the vinyl ester precursor.

Polyvinyl alcohol has excellent film-forming, emulsifying and adhesive properties. It is also resistant to oil, grease and solvents. It has high tensile strength and flexibility, as well as high oxygen and aroma barrier properties. However, these properties are dependent on humidity: water absorbed at higher humidity levels acts as a plasticiser, which reduces the polymer's tensile strength, but increases its elongation and tear strength.

== Safety and environmental considerations ==
Polyvinyl alcohol is widely used, thus its toxicity and biodegradation are of interest. Tests showed that fish (guppies) are not harmed, even at a poly(vinyl alcohol) concentration of 500 mg/L of water.

The biodegradability of PVA is affected by the molecular weight of the sample. Aqueous solutions of PVA degrade faster, which is why PVA grades that are highly water-soluble tend to have a faster biodegradation. Not all PVA grades are readily biodegradable, but studies show that high water-soluble PVA grades such as the ones used in detergents can be readily biodegradable according to OECD screening test conditions.

Orally administered PVA is relatively harmless. The safety of polyvinyl alcohol is based on some of the following observations:

- The acute oral toxicity of polyvinyl alcohol is very low, with LD(50)s in the range of 15-20 g/kg;
- Orally administered PVA is very poorly absorbed from the gastrointestinal tract;
- PVA does not accumulate in the body when administered orally;
- Polyvinyl alcohol is not mutagenic or clastogenic

== See also ==
- Polyvinyl nitrate
- Vinyl acetate
