= Vinyl alcohol =

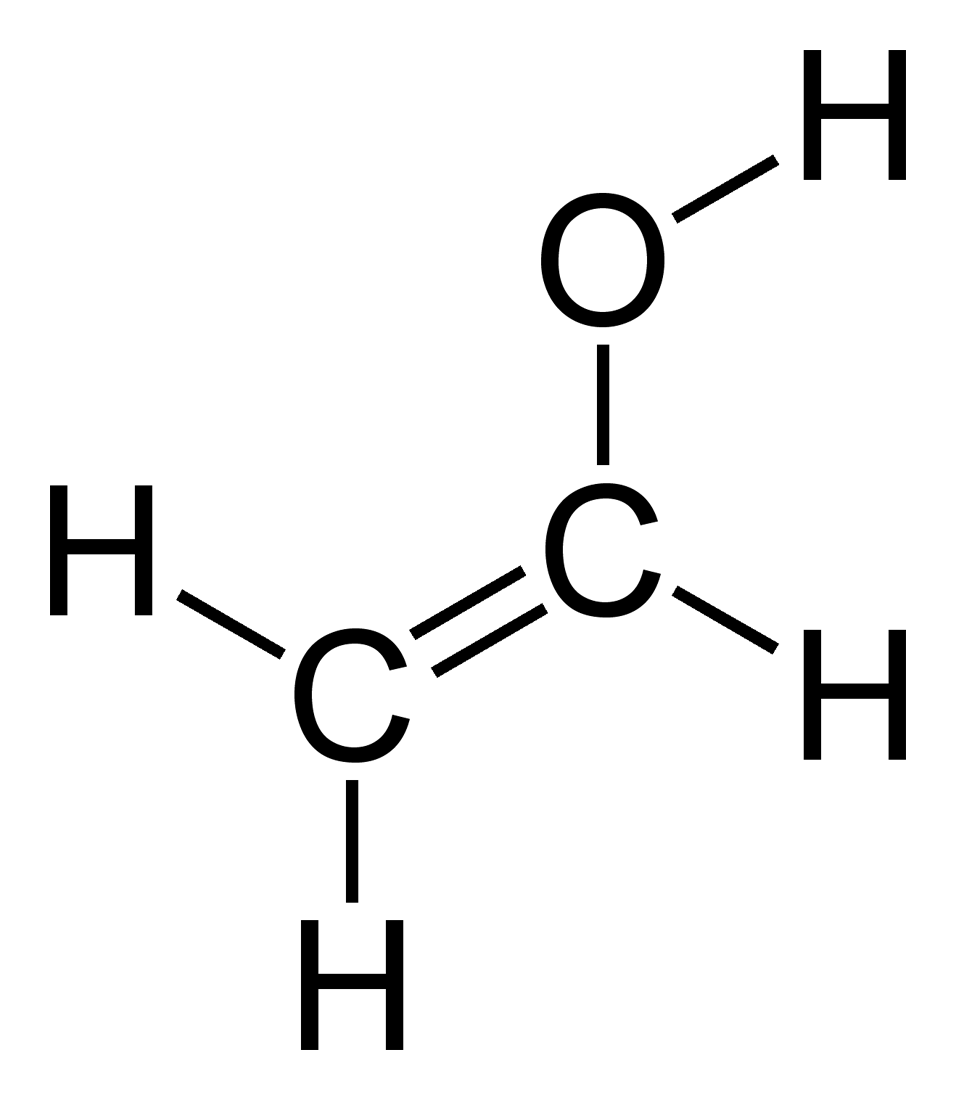
Structural formula of ethenol
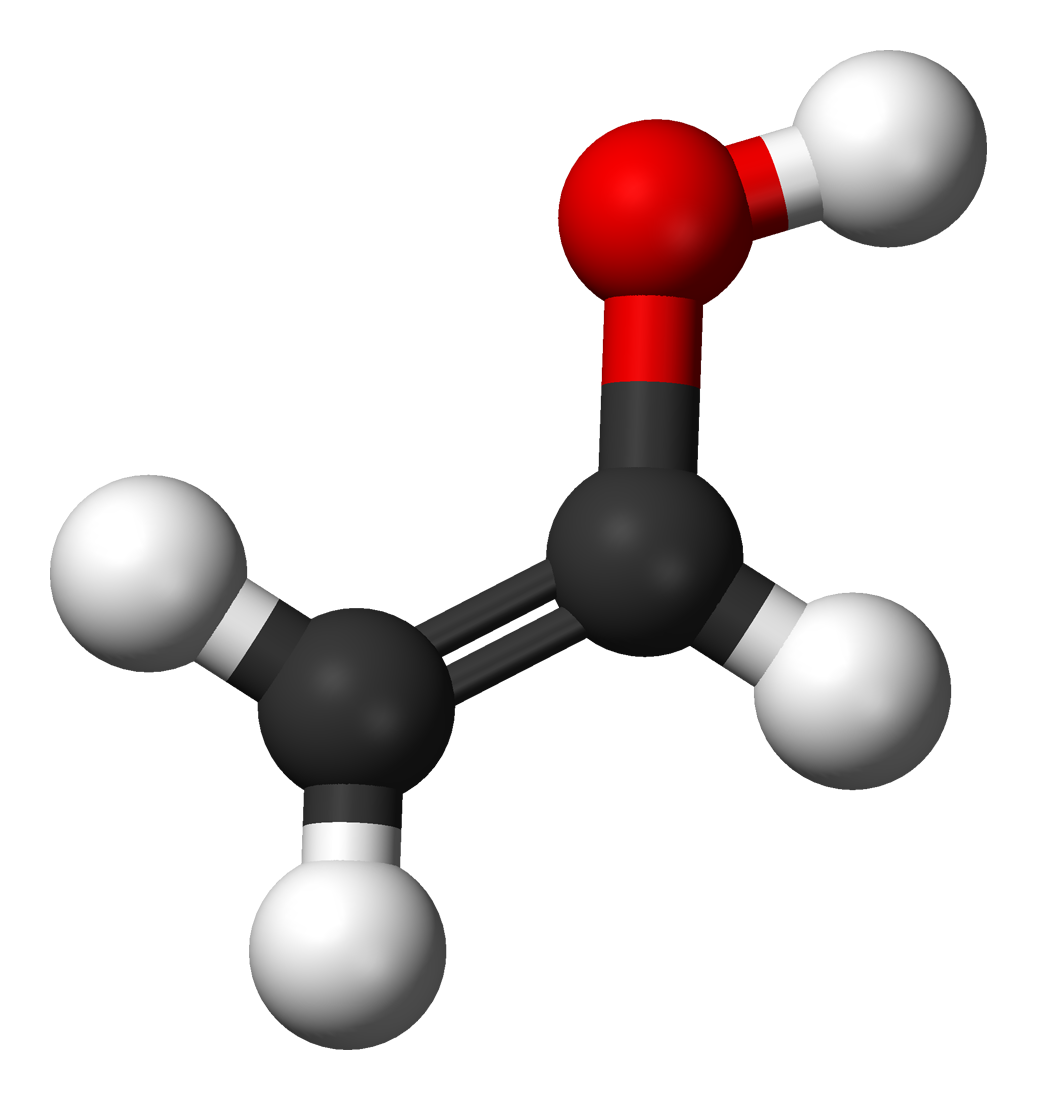
Ball-and-stick model of ethenol

Names
- Preferred IUPAC name Ethenol
- Other names Hydroxyethene; Hydroxyethylene; Ethylenol

Identifiers
CAS Number	557-75-5
3D model (JSmol)	Interactive image
ChEMBL	ChEMBL76101
ChemSpider	10726
ECHA InfoCard	100.008.350
PubChem CID	11199
UNII	GO1N1ZPR3B
CompTox Dashboard (EPA)	DTXSID8051467
- InChI: InChI=1S/C2H4O/c1-2-3/h2-3H,1H2 Key: IMROMDMJAWUWLK-UHFFFAOYSA-N; InChI=1S/C2H4O/c1-2-3/h2-3H,1H2; InChI=1S/C2H4O/c1-2-3/h2-3H,1H2 Key: IMROMDMJAWUWLK-UHFFFAOYSA-N
- SMILES: OC=C

Properties
Chemical formula	C_{2}H_{4}O
Molar mass	44.053 g/mol

Related compounds
Related compounds	Allyl alcohol
- Except where otherwise noted, data are given for materials in their standard state (at 25 °C [77 °F], 100 kPa). verify (what is ?) Infobox references

Vinyl alcohol, also called ethenol (IUPAC name; not ethanol) or ethylenol, is the simplest enol. With the formula CH_{2}CHOH, it is a labile compound that converts to acetaldehyde immediately upon isolation near room temperature. It is not a practical precursor to any compound.

== Synthesis ==
Vinyl alcohol can be formed by the pyrolytic elimination of water from ethylene glycol at a temperature of 900 °C and low pressure. Such processes are of no practical importance.

== Tautomerization of vinyl alcohol to acetaldehyde ==
Under normal conditions, vinyl alcohol converts (tautomerizes) to acetaldehyde:

At room temperature, acetaldehyde (H_{3}CC(O)H) is more stable than vinyl alcohol (H_{2}C=CHOH) by 42.7 kJ/mol. Vinyl alcohol gas isomerizes to the aldehyde with a half-life of 30 min at room temperature.

H_{2}C=CHOH → H_{3}CC(O)H

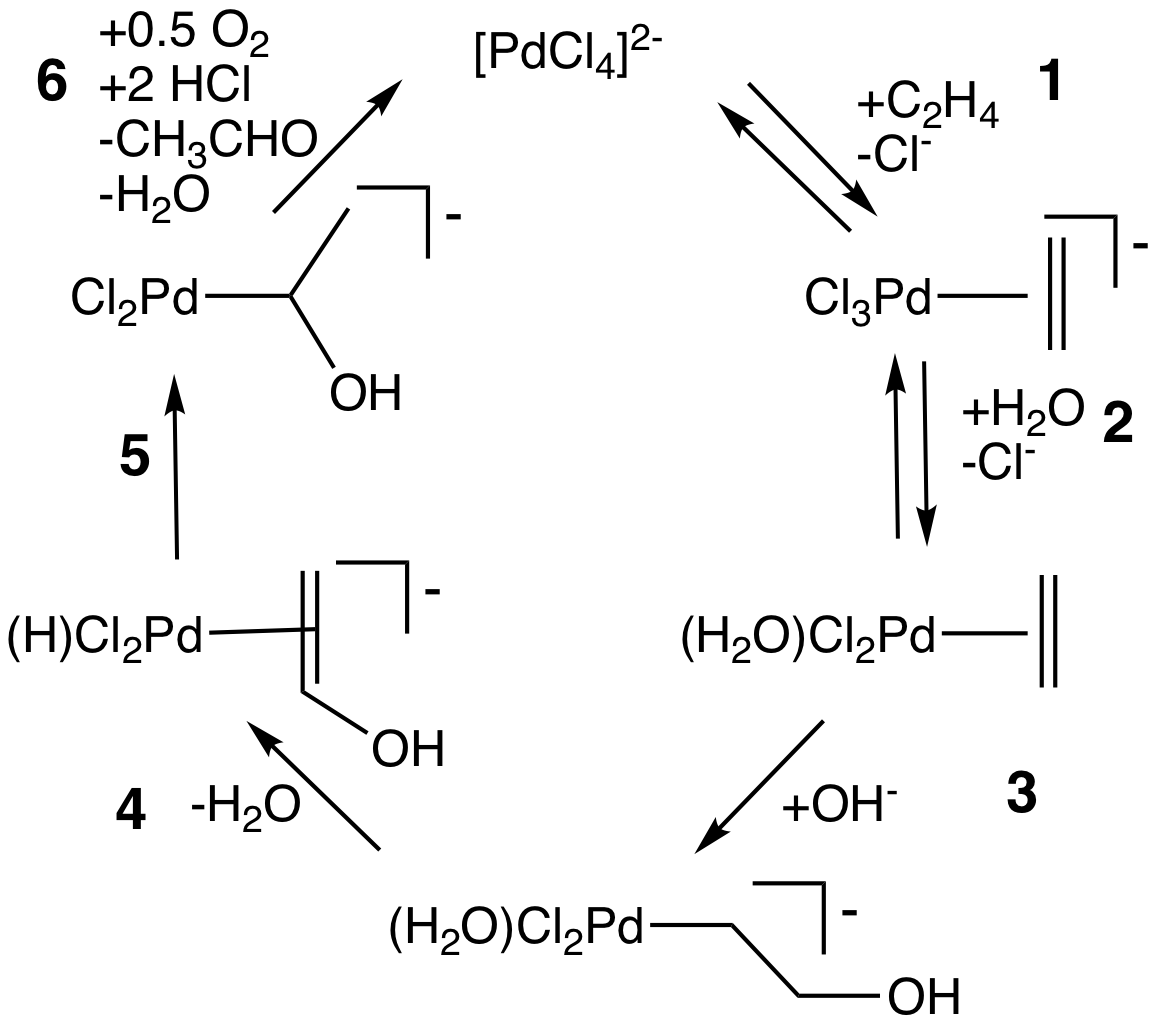
The industrial synthesis of acetaldehyde (Wacker process) proceeds via the intermediacy of a vinyl alcohol complex.

The uncatalyzed keto–enol tautomerism by a 1,3-hydrogen migration is forbidden by the Woodward–Hoffmann rules and therefore has a high activation barrier and is not a significant pathway at or near room temperature. However, even trace amounts of acids or bases (including water) can catalyze the reaction. Even with rigorous precautions to minimize adventitious moisture or proton sources, vinyl alcohol can only be stored for minutes to hours before it isomerizes to acetaldehyde. (Carbonic acid is another example of a substance that is stable when rigorously pure, but decomposes rapidly due to catalysis by trace moisture.)

The tautomerization can also be catalyzed via photochemical process. These findings suggest that the keto–enol tautomerization is a viable route under atmospheric and stratospheric conditions, relevant to a role for vinyl alcohol in the production of organic acids in the atmosphere.

Vinyl alcohol can be stabilized by controlling the water concentration in the system and utilizing the kinetic favorability of the deuterium-produced kinetic isotope effect (k_{H^{+}}/k_{D^{+}} = 4.75, k_{H_{2}O}/k_{D_{2}O} = 12). Deuterium stabilization can be accomplished through hydrolysis of a ketene precursor in the presence of a slight stoichiometric excess of heavy water (D_{2}O). Studies show that the tautomerization process is significantly inhibited at ambient temperatures (k_{t} ≈ 10^{−6} M/s), and the half-life of the enol form can easily be increased to t_{1/2} = 42 minutes for first-order hydrolysis kinetics.

== Relationship to poly(vinyl alcohol) ==
Because of the instability of vinyl alcohol, the thermoplastic polyvinyl alcohol (PVA or PVOH) is made indirectly by polymerization of vinyl acetate followed by hydrolysis of the ester bonds (Ac = acetyl; HOAc = acetic acid):

n CH_{2}=CHOAc → (CH_{2}−CHOAc)_{n}
(CH_{2}−CHOAc)_{n} + n H_{2}O → (CH_{2}−CHOH)_{n} + n HOAc

== As a ligand ==
Several metal complexes are known that contain vinyl alcohol as a ligand. One example is Pt(acac)(η^{2}-C_{2}H_{3}OH)Cl.

== Occurrence in interstellar medium ==
Vinyl alcohol was detected in the molecular cloud Sagittarius B in 2001, the last of the three stable isomers of C_{2}H_{4}O (after acetaldehyde and ethylene oxide) to be detected in space. Its stability in the (dilute) interstellar medium shows that its tautomerization does not happen unimolecularly, a fact attributed to the size of the activation energy barrier to the rearrangement being insurmountable at temperatures present in interstellar space. The vinyl alcohol to acetaldehyde rearrangement is the only keto-enol tautomerisation to have been detected in deep space, induced by the provision of secondary electrons from galactic cosmic rays.
