= Vinyl acetate =

- Skeletal formula

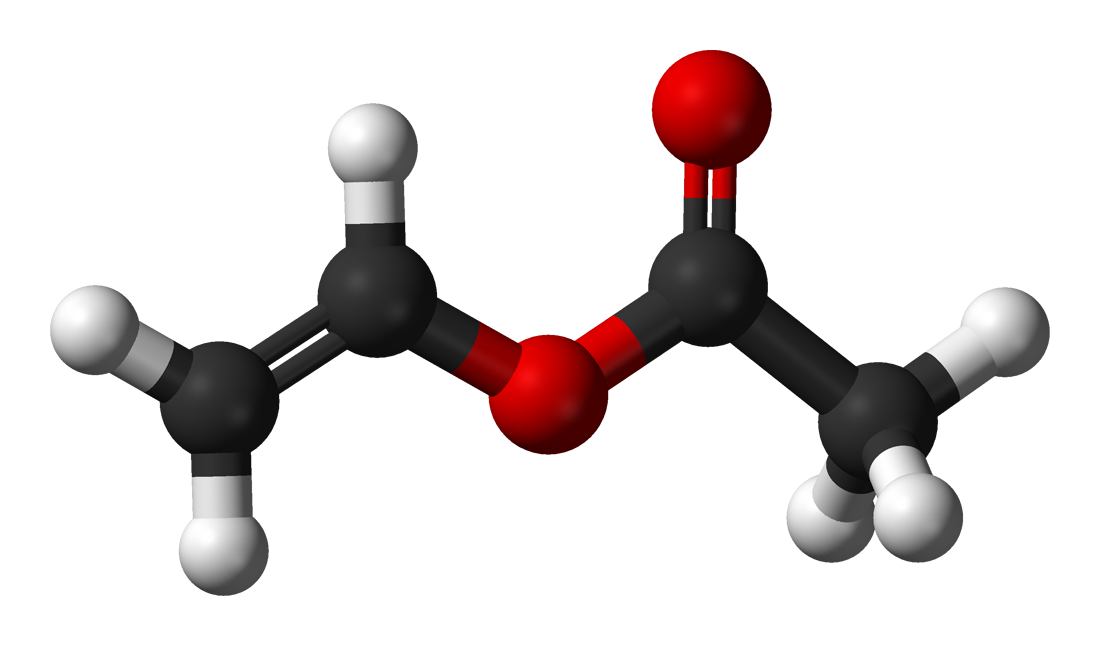
- Ball-and-stick model

Names
- Preferred IUPAC name Ethenyl acetate
- Systematic IUPAC name Ethenyl ethanoate
- Other names: Acetic acid vinyl ester; Vinyl ethanoate; Acetoxyethene; VyAc; VAM; Vinyl acetate monomer; Acetic acid ethenyl ester; 1-Acetoxyethylene

Identifiers
CAS Number	108-05-4
3D model (JSmol)	Interactive image
Beilstein Reference	1209327
ChEBI	CHEBI:46916
ChemSpider	7616
ECHA InfoCard	100.003.224
EC Number	203-545-4
KEGG	C19309
MeSH	C011566
PubChem CID	7904
UNII	L9MK238N77
UN number	1301
CompTox Dashboard (EPA)	DTXSID3021431
- InChI: InChI=1S/C4H6O2/c1-3-6-4(2)5/h3H,1H2,2H3 Key: XTXRWKRVRITETP-UHFFFAOYSA-N; InChI=1/C4H6O2/c1-3-6-4(2)5/h3H,1H2,2H3 Key: XTXRWKRVRITETP-UHFFFAOYAB
- SMILES: C=COC(C)=O

Properties
Chemical formula	C_{4}H_{6}O_{2}
Molar mass	86.090 g·mol^{−1}
Appearance	Colorless liquid
Odor	Sweet, pleasant, fruity; may be sharp and irritating
Density	0.934 g/cm^{3}
Melting point	−93.5 °C (−136.3 °F; 179.7 K)
Boiling point	72.7 °C (162.9 °F; 345.8 K)
Magnetic susceptibility (χ)	−46.4×10^{−6} cm^{3}/mol

Hazards
- GHS labelling
Pictograms	(GHS02: Flammable) (GHS07: Exclamation mark) (GHS08: Health hazard)
Signal word	Danger
Hazard statements	H225, H332, H335, H351
Precautionary statements	P201, P202, P210, P233, P240, P241, P242, P243, P261, P271, P280, P281, P303+P361+P353, P304+P312, P304+P340, P308+P313, P312, P370+P378, P403+P233, P403+P235, P405, P501
NFPA 704 (fire diamond)	2 3 2
Flash point	−8 °C (18 °F; 265 K)
Autoignition temperature	427 °C (801 °F; 700 K)
Explosive limits	2.6–13.40%
- NIOSH (US health exposure limits)
PEL (Permissible)	none
Safety data sheet (SDS)	ICSC 0347
- Except where otherwise noted, data are given for materials in their standard state (at 25 °C [77 °F], 100 kPa). verify (what is ?) Infobox references

Vinyl acetate is an organic compound with the formula CH_{3}CO_{2}CH=CH_{2}. This colorless liquid is the precursor to polyvinyl acetate, ethylene-vinyl acetate, polyvinyl alcohol, and other important industrial polymers.

== Production ==
The worldwide production capacity of vinyl acetate was estimated at 6,969,000 tonnes/year in 2007, with most capacity concentrated in the United States (1,585,000 all in Texas), China (1,261,000), Japan (725,000) and Taiwan (650,000). The average list price for 2008 was US$1600/tonne. Celanese is the largest producer (ca 25% of the worldwide capacity), while other significant producers include China Petrochemical Corporation (7%), Chang Chun Group (6%), and LyondellBasell (5%).

Vinyl acetate is mainly (80%) polymerized, and the resulting polymer is hydrolyzed to give polyvinyl alcohol.

== Preparation ==
Vinyl acetate is the acetate ester of vinyl alcohol. Since vinyl alcohol is highly unstable (with respect to acetaldehyde), the preparation of vinyl acetate is more complex than the synthesis of other acetate esters.

The major industrial route involves the reaction of ethylene and acetic acid with oxygen in the presence of a palladium catalyst.

2 C_{2}H_{4} + 2 CH_{3}CO_{2}H + O_{2} → 2 CH_{3}CO_{2}CHCH_{2} + 2 H_{2}O

This method has replaced the addition of acetic acid to acetylene. The main side reaction is the combustion of organic precursors.

=== Mechanism ===
Isotope labeling and kinetics experiments suggest that the mechanism involves PdCH_{2}CH_{2}OAc-containing intermediates. Beta-hydride elimination would generate vinyl acetate and a palladium hydride, which would be oxidized to give hydroxide.

=== Alternative routes ===
Vinyl acetate was once mainly prepared by hydroesterification, i.e., the addition of acetic acid to acetylene in the presence of metal catalysts. Using mercury(II) catalysts, vinyl acetate was first prepared by Fritz Klatte in 1912. Presently, zinc acetate is used as the catalyst:

CH_{3}CO_{2}H + C_{2}H_{2} → CH_{3}CO_{2}CHCH_{2}.

Approximately 1/3 of the world's production relies on this route, which, because it is environmentally messy, is mainly practiced in countries with relaxed environmental regulations, such as China.

Another route to vinyl acetate involves thermal decomposition of ethylidene diacetate:

(CH_{3}CO_{2})_{2}CHCH_{3} → CH_{3}CO_{2}CHCH_{2} + CH_{3}CO_{2}H.

== Polymerization ==
It can be polymerized to give polyvinyl acetate (PVAc). With other monomers it can be used to prepare various copolymers such as ethylene-vinyl acetate (EVA), vinyl acetate-acrylic acid (VA/AA), polyvinyl chloride acetate (PVCA), and polyvinylpyrrolidone (Vp/Va copolymer, used in hair gels). Due to the instability of the radical, attempts to control the polymerization by most "living/controlled" radical processes have proved problematic. However, RAFT (or more specifically, MADIX) polymerization offers a convenient method of controlling the synthesis of PVA by the addition of a xanthate or a dithiocarbamate chain transfer agent.

== Other reactions ==
Vinyl acetate is useful in organic synthesis. Vinyl acetate undergoes many of the reactions anticipated for an alkene and an ester.

The most important ester reaction is transesterification with a variety of carboxylic acids. Transacetylation is used to obtain enantioenriched alcohols and esters. Iridium-catalyzed transacetylation have also been demonstrated:

ROH + CH_{2}=CHOAc → ROCH=CH_{2} + HOAc.

As an electron-rich alkene, vinyl acetate undergoes a variety of additions. Diels-Alder reactions occur with dienes, and 2+2 photocycloadditions occur with monoalkenes. Bromine adds to give the dibromide. Hydrogen halides add to give 1-haloethyl acetates, which cannot be generated by other methods because of the non-availability of the corresponding halo-alcohols. Acetic acid adds in the presence of palladium catalysts to give ethylidene diacetate, CH_{3}CH(OAc)_{2}.

== Toxicity evaluation ==
Vinyl acetate has low toxicity. Oral LD_{50} for rats is 2920 mg/kg.

On January 31, 2009, the Government of Canada's final assessment concluded that exposure to vinyl acetate is not harmful to human health. This decision under the Canadian Environmental Protection Act (CEPA) was based on new information received during the public comment period, as well as more recent information from the risk assessment conducted by the European Union.

In the context of large-scale release into the environment, it is classified as an extremely hazardous substance in the United States as defined in Section 302 of the U.S. Emergency Planning and Community Right-to-Know Act (42 U.S.C. 11002), under which it "does not meet toxicity criteria[,] but because of its acute lethality, high production volume [or] known risk is considered a chemical of concern". By this law, it is subject to strict reporting requirements by facilities that produce, store, or use it in quantities greater than 1,000 pounds (450 kilograms).

== See also ==
- Polyvinyl alcohol
- Vinyl propionate
