= Liver metastasis =

Metastatic liver disease
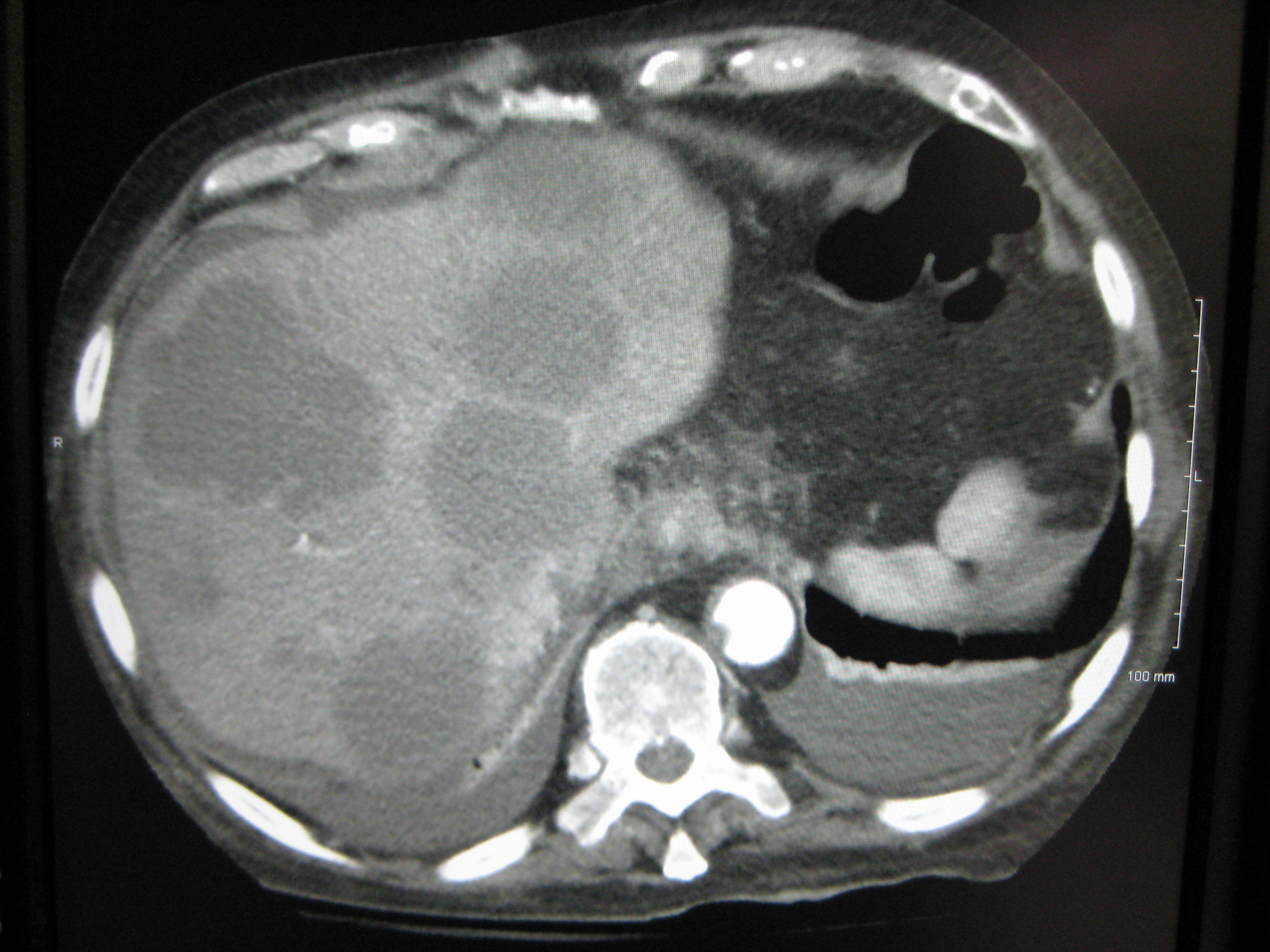
- Axial CT of the abdomen showing multiple liver metastases
- Specialty: Hepatology, oncology

A liver metastasis is a malignant tumor in the liver that has spread from another organ that is affected by cancer. This can also be called secondary liver cancer or metastatic liver disease. The liver is a common site for metastatic disease because of its rich, dual blood supply (the liver receives blood via the hepatic artery and portal vein). Metastatic tumors in the liver are 20 times more common than primary liver tumors (tumors that originate in the liver). In 50% of all cases the primary tumor is of the gastrointestinal tract; other common sites include the breast, ovaries, bronchus, thyroid, and kidney. People with colorectal cancer are at risk of liver metastases, which dictates their prognosis.

== Signs and symptoms ==
The signs and symptoms of secondary liver cancer are usually fairly non-specific (they can also be caused by other things). The following is a list of possible signs and symptoms of liver metastasis:

- Hepatomegaly (liver enlargement)
- Tenderness on the right side of the stomach
- Cachexic (muscle loss)
- Weight loss and low appetite
- Ascites (fluid buildup in the stomach area)
- Jaundice (yellowing of the skin)
- Pyrexia, or fever, in up to 10% of people with liver metastasis

Clinical signs include:

- Higher levels of alkaline phosphatase (ALP) and gamma glutamyl transpeptidase (GGT), and positive findings on Ultrasound scan and CT scans.

== Causes ==
Liver metastasis is common in people with metastatic cancer. The rich blood supply in the liver, the role of filtering the blood from the digestive organs lead to the liver, and diverse cell types make the liver a common place for cancer metastasis. Metastases to the liver are more frequently diagnosed in people than primary liver cancers such as hepatocellular carcinoma or cholangiocarcinoma. Most hepatic metastases originate from adenocarcinomas, though other less common types such as squamous cell carcinoma, neuroendocrine tumors, lymphoma, sarcoma, and melanoma are also found.

== Mechanism ==
Different cell types in the liver are involved in promoting and then sustaining the cancer metastasis in the liver. Cell types include: Kupffer cells, parenchymal hepatocytes, sinusoidal endothelial cells in the liver, dendritic cells, and blood based immune cells (monocytes, macrophages, neutrophils). The metastasis develops in four phases:1) microvascular development, 2) pre-angiogenic phase, 3) angiogenic phase (growth of blood vessels), and 4), growth of the tumor phase.

Tumor emboli entering the sinusoids through the liver blood supply appear to be physically obstructed by the Kupffer cells, but if tumor emboli are larger, they tend to become lodged in the portal venous branches.

== Diagnosis ==
Imaging such as triple-phase CT scans or MRI's are required to evaluate and diagnose a suspected metastasis on the liver. The imaging may also provide information about the source of the primary disease. Other diagnostic criteria include:

- Hemoglobin decrease
- Liver function test: ALP elevated, bilirubin elevated, albumin decrease
- Carcinoembryonic antigen for colorectal secondary metastasis
- Ultrasound scan
- Biopsy under ultrasound control
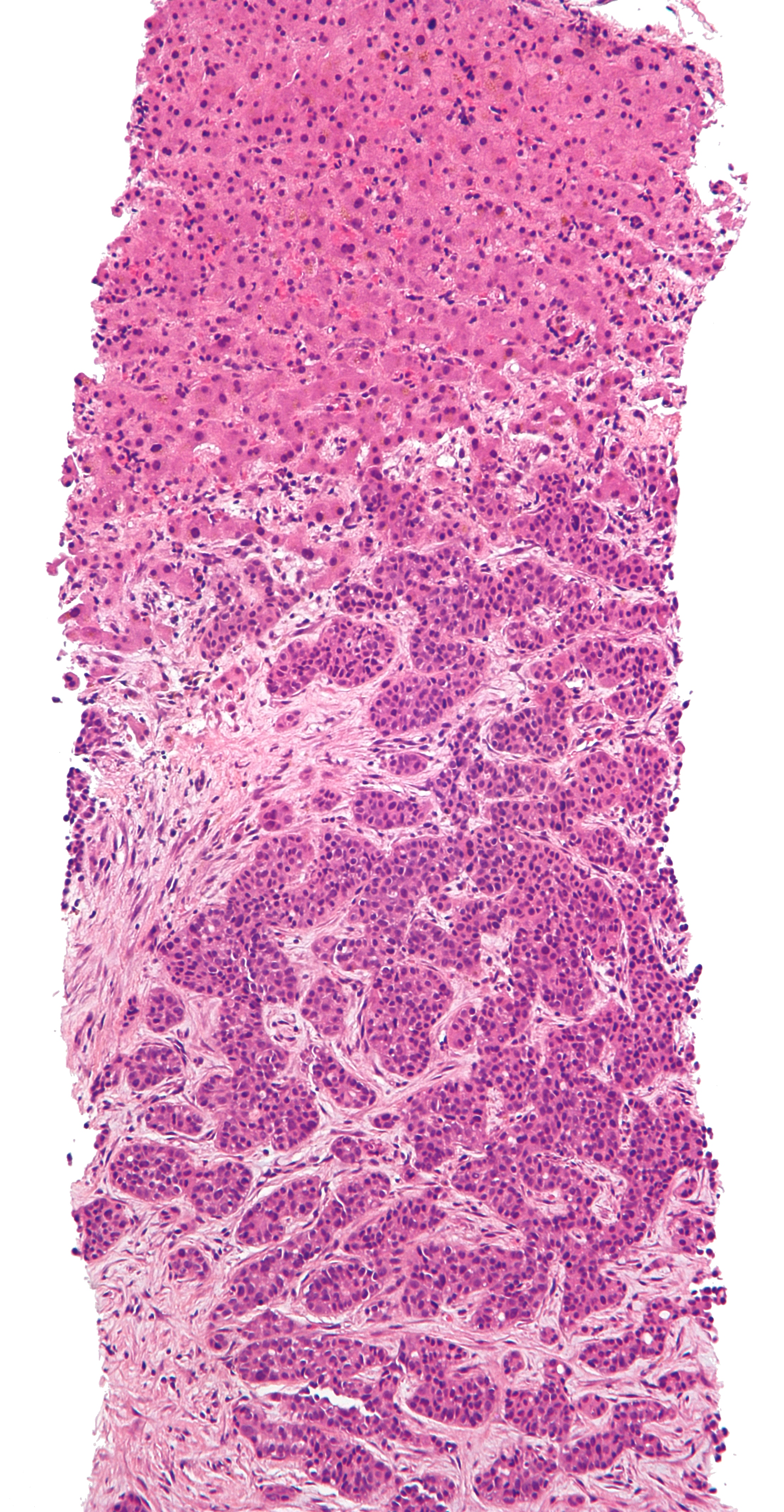
Micrograph of a liver core needle biopsy showing metastatic cancer.

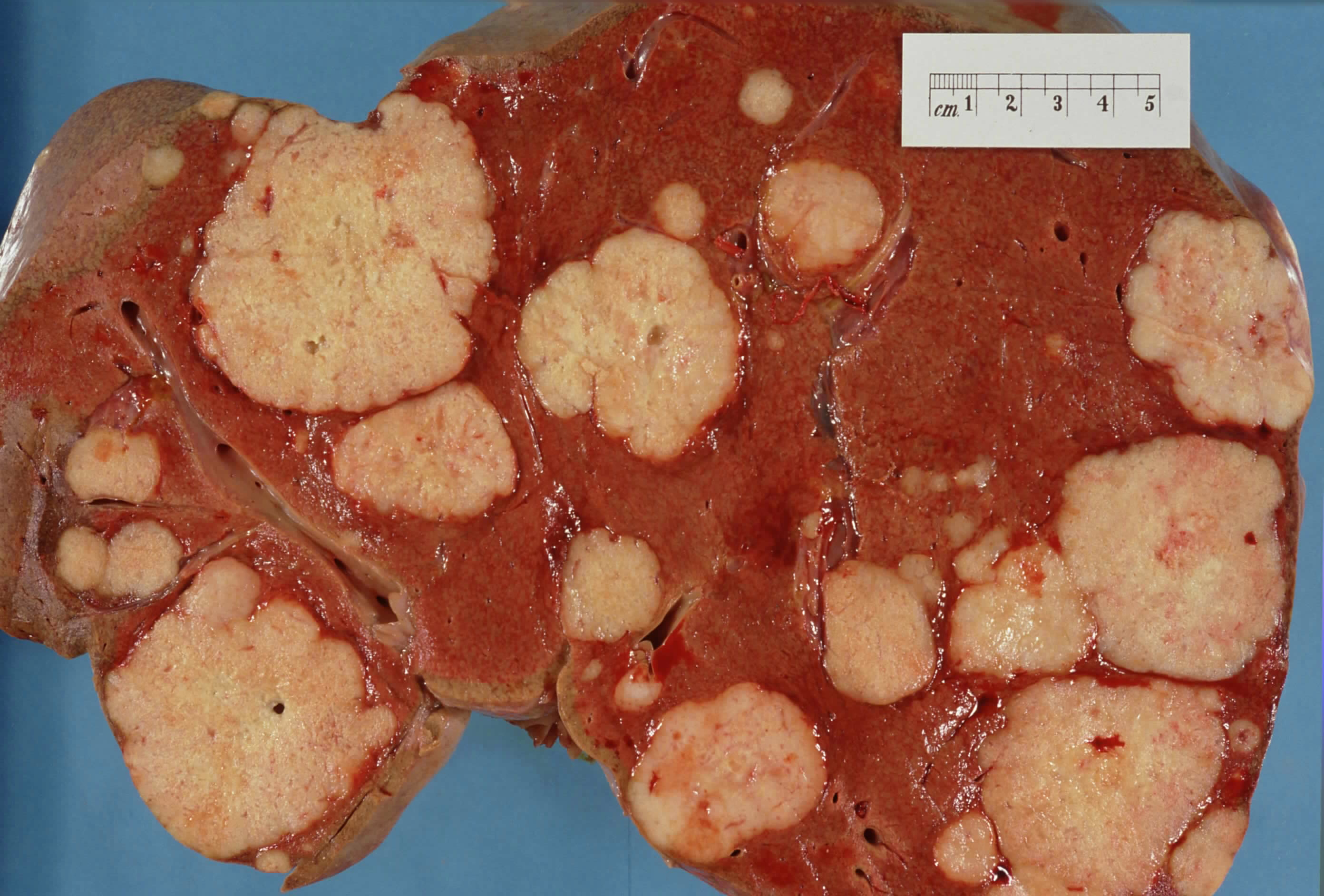
Cross section of a human liver, taken at autopsy examination, showing multiple large pale tumor deposits. The tumor is an adenocarcinoma derived from a primary lesion in the body of the pancreas.

Main sites of metastases for some common cancer types, showing liver as the target for many types. Primary cancers are denoted by "...cancer" and their main metastasis sites are denoted by "...metastases".

Metastatic disease to the liver

== Treatment ==
The first line of treatment is surgical resection of the affected tissue(hepatectomy). Other treatments include chemotherapy and/or therapies specifically aimed at the liver like radiofrequency ablation, microwave ablation, intrahepatic pump, transcatheter arterial chemoembolization, selective internal radiation therapy and irreversible electroporation. For most patients no effective treatment exists because both lobes are usually involved, making surgical resection impossible. Younger patients with metastases from colorectal cancer confined to one lobe of the liver and up to 4 in number may be treated by partial hepatectomy. In selected cases, chemotherapy may be given systemically or via hepatic artery.

In some tumors, notably those arising from the colon and rectum, apparently solitary metastases or metastases to one or other lobes may be resected. A careful search for other metastases is required, including local recurrence of the original primary tumor (e.g., via colonoscopy) and dissemination elsewhere (e.g., via CT of the thorax). 5-year survival rates of 60% have been reported following resection.

When resection for cure is not possible (R0 resection), percutaneous ethanol injection has been suggested to dehydrate and kill the tumour cells, however there is not enough evidence to determine the effectiveness and safety of this approach.

Newer therapeutic approaches include full body (systemic) therapies, bevacizumab, cetuximab, and immunomodulator medications.

== Epidemiology ==
Over 5% of people with primary cancer developed liver metastasis. In 70% to 80% of metastatic colorectal cancer cases, the spread is limited to the liver. The overall survival at 1-year has been estimated to be about 15%. Overall, survival may be lower in people with primary cancer in the testis, breast, prostate, anus, and people with melanoma.
