= Selective internal radiation therapy =

Selective internal radiation therapy (SIRT)
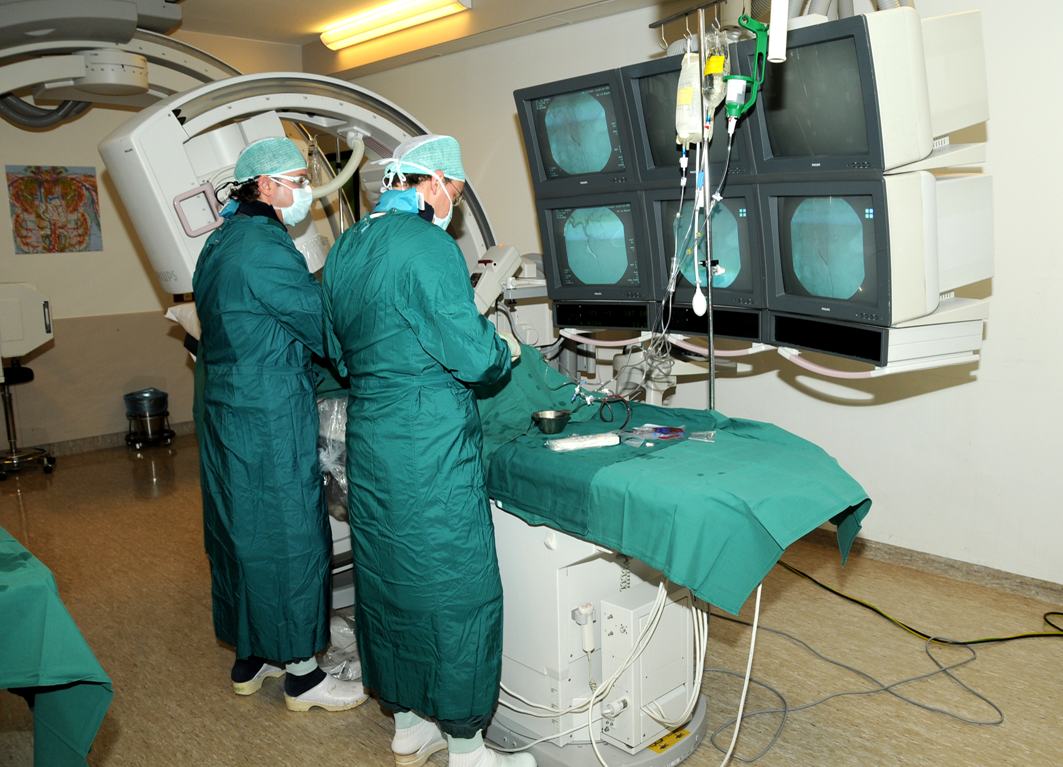
- Interventional radiologists performing radioembolisation
- Other names: transarterial radioembolization (TARE)
- Specialty: Oncology, interventional radiology

Selective internal radiation therapy (SIRT), also known as transarterial radioembolization (TARE), radioembolization or intra-arterial microbrachytherapy is a form of radionuclide therapy used in interventional radiology to treat cancer. It is generally for selected patients with surgically unresectable cancers, especially hepatocellular carcinoma or metastasis to the liver. The treatment involves injecting tiny microspheres of radioactive material into the arteries that supply the tumor, where the spheres lodge in the small vessels of the tumor. Because this treatment combines radiotherapy with embolization, it is also called radioembolization. The chemotherapeutic analogue (combining chemotherapy with embolization) is called chemoembolization, of which transcatheter arterial chemoembolization (TACE) is the usual form.

== Principles ==
Radiation therapy is used to kill cancer cells; however, normal cells are also damaged in the process. Currently, therapeutic doses of radiation can be targeted to tumors with great accuracy using linear accelerators in radiation oncology; however, when irradiating using external beam radiotherapy, the beam will always need to travel through healthy tissue, and the normal liver tissue is very sensitive to radiation. The radiation sensitivity of the liver parenchyma limits the radiation dose that can be delivered via external beam radiotherapy. SIRT, on the other hand, involves the direct insertion of radioactive microspheres to a region, resulting in a local and targeted deposition of radioactive dose. It is therefore well-suited for treatment of liver tumors. Due to the local deposition, SIRT is regarded as a type of locoregional therapy (LRT).

The liver has a dual blood supply system; it receives blood from both the hepatic artery and the portal vein. The healthy liver tissue is mainly perfused by the portal vein, while most liver malignancies derive their blood supply from the hepatic artery. Therefore, locoregional therapies such as transarterial chemoembolization or radioembolization, can selectively be administered in the arteries that are supplying the tumors and will preferentially lead to deposition of the particles in the tumor, while sparing the healthy liver tissue from harmful side effects.

In addition, malignancies (including primary and many metastatic liver cancers) are often hypervascular; tumor blood supplies are increased compared to those of normal tissue, further leading to preferential deposition of particles in the tumors.

SIRT can be performed using several techniques, including whole liver treatment, lobar or segmental approaches. Whole liver SIRT targets the entire liver in one treatment and can be used when the disease is spread throughout the liver. Radiation lobectomy targets one of the two liver lobes and can be a good treatment option when only a single lobe is involved or when treating the whole liver in two separate treatments, one lobe at the time. The segmental approach, also called radiation segmentectomy, is a technique where a high dose of radiation is delivered in one or two Couinaud liver segments only. The high dose results in eradication of the tumor while damage to healthy liver tissue is contained to the targeted segments only. This approach results in effective necrosis of the targeted segments. Segmentectomy is only feasible when the tumor(s) are contained in one or two segments. Which technique is applied is determined by catheter placement. The more distally the catheter is placed, the more localized the technique.

== Therapeutic applications ==
Candidates for radioembolization include patients with:

1. Unresectable liver cancer of primary or secondary origin, such as hepatocellular carcinoma and liver-metastases from a different origin (e.g. colorectal cancer, breast cancer, neuroendocrine cancer, cholangiocarcinoma or soft tissue sarcomas)
2. No response or intolerance to regional or systemic chemotherapy
3. No eligibility for potentially curative options such as radiofrequency ablation.

SIRT is currently considered as a salvage therapy. It has been shown to be safe and effective in patients for whom surgery is not possible, and chemotherapy was not effective. Subsequently, several large phase III trials have been started to evaluate the efficacy of SIRT when used earlier in the treatment scheme or in combination treatments with systemic therapy.

SIRT, when added to first line therapy for patients with metastases of colorectal cancer, was evaluated in the SIRFLOX, FOXFIRE and FOXFIRE Global studies. For primary liver cancer (HCC), two large trials comparing SIRT with standard of care chemotherapy, Sorafenib, have been completed, namely the SARAH and SIRveNIB trials.

Results of these studies, published in 2017 and 2018, reported no superiority of SIRT over chemotherapy in terms of overall survival (SARAH, SIRveNIB, FOXFIRE). In the SIRFLOX study, better progression-free survival was also not observed. These trials did not give direct evidence supporting SIRT as a first-line treatment regime for liver cancer. However, these studies did show that SIRT is generally better tolerated than systemic therapy, with less severe adverse events. Simultaneously, for HCC, data derived from a large retrospective analysis showed promising results for SIRT as an earlier stage treatment, particularly with high dose radiation segmentectomy and lobectomy.

More studies and cohort analyses are underway to evaluate subgroups of patients who benefit from SIRT as a first-line or later treatment, or to evaluate the effect of SIRT in combination with chemotherapy (EPOCH, SIR-STEP, SORAMIC, STOP HCC).

For HCC patients currently ineligible for liver transplant, SIRT can sometimes be used to decreases tumor size allowing patients to be candidates for curative treatment. This is sometimes called bridging therapy.

When comparing SIRT with transarterial chemoembolization (TACE), several studies have shown favorable results for SIRT, such as longer time to progression, higher complete response rates and longer progression-free survival.

== Radionuclides and microspheres ==
There are currently two types of commercially available microsphere for SIRT, a third one was available but has been discontinued. They make use of the radionuclide yttrium-90 (^{90}Y) and are made of either glass (TheraSphere) or resin (SIR-Spheres). The discontinued type used holmium-166 (^{166}Ho) and was made of poly(l-lactic acid), PLLA, (QuiremSpheres). The therapeutic effect of both commercially-available types is based on local deposition of radiation dose by high-energy beta particles. Both types of microsphere are permanent implants and stay in the tissue even after radioactivity has decayed.

^{90}Y, a pure beta emitter, has half-life 2.6 days, or 64.1 hours. ^{166}Ho emits both beta and gamma rays, with half-life 26.8 hours. Both ^{90}Y and ^{166}Ho have a mean tissue penetration of a few millimeters. ^{90}Y can be imaged using bremsstrahlung SPECT and positron emission tomography (PET). Bremsstrahlung SPECT uses of the approximately 23000 Bremsstrahlung photons per megabecquerel that are produced by interaction of beta particles with tissue. The positrons needed for PET imaging come from a small branch of the decay chain (branching ratio 32×10^{−6}) that gives positrons. ^{90}Y's low bremsstrahlung photon and positron yield make it difficult to perform quantitative imaging.

^{166}Ho's additional gamma emission (81 KeV, 6.7%) makes ^{166}Ho microspheres quantifiable using a gamma camera. Holmium is also paramagnetic, enabling visibility and quantifiability in MRI even after the radioactivity has decayed.

Trade name	SIR-Spheres	TheraSphere	QuiremSpheres (discontinued)
Manufacturer	Sirtex Medical	Boston Scientific	Quirem Medical (Terumo)
Mean diameter (μm)	32	25	30
Specific gravity (g/dL) (compared to blood)	1.6 (150%)	3.6 (300%)	1.4 (130%)
Activity per particle (Bq)	40-70	1250-2500	330-450
Microspheres per 3 GBq vial (millions)	40-80	1.2	40-80
Material	Resin with bound yttrium	Glass with yttrium in matrix	PLLA with holmium
Radionuclide (half-life)	^{90}Y (64.1 hours)	^{90}Y (64.1 hours)	^{166}Ho (26.8 hours)
Beta-radiation (MeV) (E_{max})	2.28	2.28	1.77 (48.7%) 1.85 (50.0%)
Gamma-radiation (keV)	-	-	81 (6.7%)

== Regulatory approval ==
=== United States ===
Theraspheres (glass ^{90}Y microspheres) are FDA approved under a humanitarian device exemption for hepatocellular carcinoma (HCC). SIR-spheres (resin ^{90}Y microspheres) are FDA approved under premarket approval for colorectal metastases in combination with chemotherapy.

=== Europe ===
SIR-Spheres were CE-marked as a medical device in 2002, for treating advanced inoperable liver tumors, and Theraspheres in 2014, for treating hepatic neoplasia. QuiremSpheres (PLLA ^{166}Ho microspheres) received their CE mark in April 2015 for treating unresectable liver tumors and were only available for the European market.

== Procedure ==
^{90}Y microsphere treatment requires patient-individualized planning with cross-sectional imaging and arteriograms. Contrast computed tomography and/or contrast-enhanced magnetic resonance imaging of the liver is required to assess tumor and normal liver volumes, portal vein status, and extrahepatic tumor burden. Liver and kidney function tests should be performed; patients with irreversibly elevated serum bilirubin, AST and ALT are excluded, as these are markers of poor liver function. Use of iodinated contrast should be avoided or minimized in patients with chronic kidney disease. Tumor marker levels are also evaluated. Hepatic artery technetium (99mTc) macro aggregated albumin (MAA) scan is performed to evaluate hepatopulmonary shunting (resulting from hepatopulmonary syndrome). Therapeutic radioactive particles travelling through such a shunt can result in a high absorbed radiation dose to the lungs, possibly resulting in radiation pneumonitis. Lung dose >30 gray means increased risk of such pneumonitis.

Initial angiographic evaluation can include an abdominal aortogram, Superior mesenteric and Celiac arteriograms, and selective right and left liver arteriograms. These tests can show gastrointestinal vascular anatomy and flow characteristics. Extrahepatic vessels found on angiographic evaluation can be embolized, to prevent nontarget deposition of microspheres, that can lead to gastrointestinal ulcers. Or the catheter tip can be moved more distally, past the extrahepatic vessels. Once the branch of the hepatic artery supplying the tumor is identified and the tip of the catheter is selectively placed within the artery, the ^{90}Y or ^{166}Ho microspheres are infused. If preferred, particle infusion can be alternated with contrast infusion, to check for stasis or backflow. Radiation dose absorbed, depends on microsphere distribution within the tumor vascularization. Equal distribution is necessary to ensure tumor cells are not spared due to ≈2.5mm mean tissue penetration, with maximum penetration up to 11mm for ^{90}Y or 8.7mm for ^{166}Ho.

After treatment, for ^{90}Y microspheres, bremsstrahlung SPECT or PET scanning may be done within 24 hours after radioembolization to evaluate the distribution. For ^{166}Ho microspheres, quantitative SPECT or MRI can be done. Weeks after treatment, computed tomography or MRI can be done to evaluate anatomic changes. ^{166}Ho microspheres are still visible on MRI after radioactivity has decayed, because holmium is paramagnetic. FDG positron emission tomography may also be done to evaluate changes in metabolic activity.

== Adverse effects ==
Complications include postradioembolization syndrome (PRS), hepatic complications, biliary complications, portal hypertension and lymphopenia. Complications due to extrahepatic deposition include radiation pneumonitis, gastrointestinal ulcers and vascular injury.

Postradioembolization syndrome (PRS) includes fatigue, nausea, vomiting, abdominal discomfort or pain, and cachexia, occurring in 20-70% of patients. Steroids and antiemetic agents may decrease the incidence of PRS.

Liver complications include cirrhosis leading to portal hypertension, radioembolization-induced liver disease (REILD), transient elevations in liver enzymes, and fulminant liver failure. REILD is characterized by jaundice, ascites, hyperbilirubinemia and hypoalbuminemia developing at least 2 weeks-4 months after SIRT, absent tumor progression or biliary obstruction. It can range from minor to fatal and is related to (over)exposure of healthy liver tissue to radiation.

Biliary complications include cholecystitis and biliary strictures.

== History ==
Investigation of yttrium-90 and other radioisotopes for cancer treatment began in the 1960s. Many key concepts, such as preferential blood supply and tumor vascularity, were discovered during this time. Reports of initial use of resin particles of ^{90}Y in humans were published in the late 1970s. In the 1980s, the safety and feasibility of resin and glass yttrium-90 microsphere therapy for liver cancer were validated in a canine model. Clinical trials of yttrium-90 applied to the liver continued throughout the late 1980s to the 1990s, establishing the safety of the therapy. More recently, larger trials and RCTs have shown safety and efficacy of ^{90}Y therapy for the treatment of both primary and metastatic liver malignancies.

Development of holmium-166 microspheres started in the 1990s. The intention was to develop a microsphere with therapeutic radiation dose similar to ^{90}Y, but with better imaging properties, so that distribution of microspheres in the liver could be assessed more precisely. In the 2000s, development progressed to animal studies. ^{166}Ho microspheres for SIRT were first used in humans in 2009, which was first published in 2012. Since then, several trials have been performed showing safety and efficacy of ^{166}Ho SIRT, and more studies are ongoing.

== See also ==
- Targeted alpha-particle therapy
- Transcatheter arterial chemoembolization
