= DNAJB1 =

Protein-coding gene in the species Homo sapiens

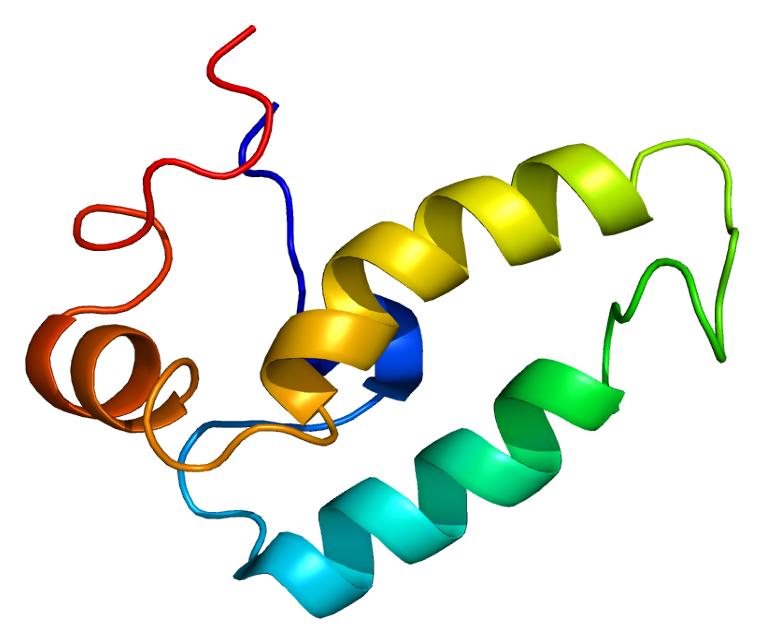

Identifiers
- Aliases: DNAJB1, HSPF1, Hdj1, Hsp40, RSPH16B, Sis1, DnaJ heat shock protein family (Hsp40) member B1
- External IDs: OMIM: 604572; MGI: 1931874; GeneCards: DNAJB1
Available structures
PDB	Ortholog search: PDBe RCSB
PDB	List of PDB id codes 1HDJ, 2QLD, 3AGX, 3AGY, 3AGZ, 4WB7

Gene location (Human)
Chr.	Chromosome 19 (human)
Band	19p13.12	Start	14,514,769 bp
Band	19p13.12	End	14,560,391 bp

Gene location (Mouse)
Chr.	Chromosome 8 (mouse)
Band	8|8 C2	Start	84,334,822 bp
Band	8|8 C2	End	84,339,282 bp
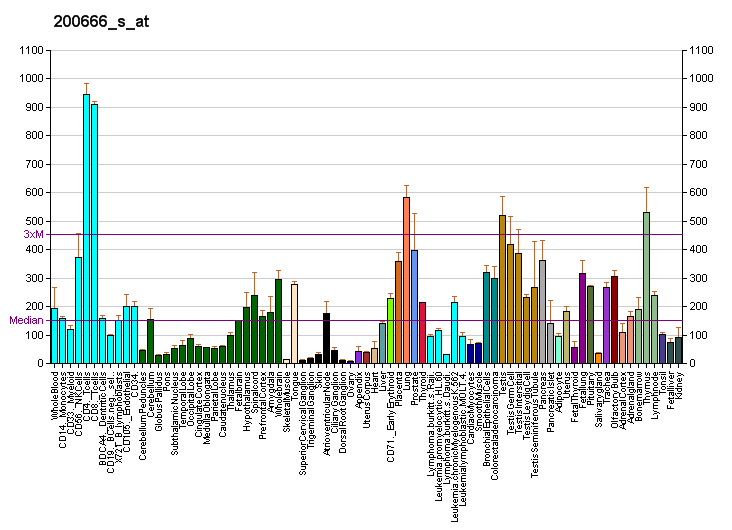

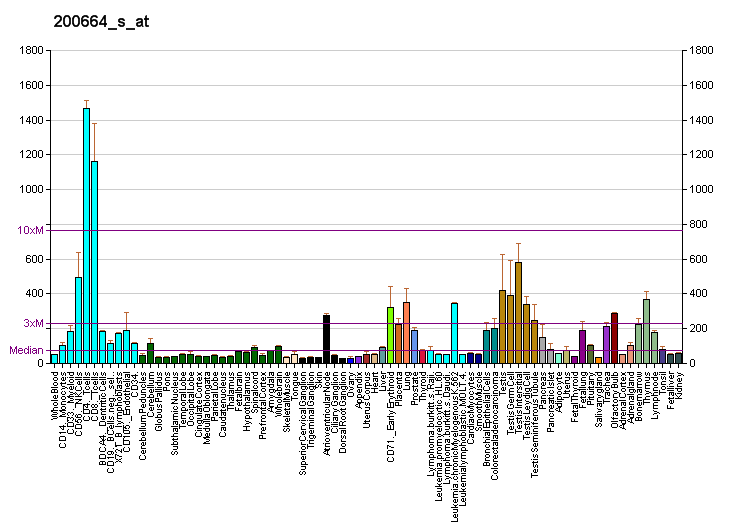
RNA expression pattern
Bgee	Human / Mouse (ortholog); Top expressed in: gallbladder; mucosa of pharynx; left testis; ventricular zone; right testis; trachea; buccal mucosa cell; epithelium of esophagus; vagina; cardia / Top expressed in: seminiferous tubule; motor neuron; utricle; primitive streak; ascending aorta; aortic valve; fossa; Epithelium of choroid plexus; conjunctival fornix; spermatid; More reference expression data
BioGPS	More reference expression data
Gene ontology
Molecular function	unfolded protein binding; ATPase binding; Hsp70 protein binding; chaperone binding; protein binding; ATPase activator activity; transcription corepressor activity; cadherin binding
Cellular component	cytosol; nucleolus; extracellular exosome; nucleus; nucleoplasm; cytoplasm; postsynaptic density; soma; dendritic spine; sperm head; postsynapse; glutamatergic synapse
Biological process	regulation of cellular response to heat; response to unfolded protein; positive regulation of ATP-dependent activity; protein folding; chaperone cofactor-dependent protein refolding; negative regulation of inclusion body assembly; negative regulation of transcription from RNA polymerase II promoter in response to stress; negative regulation of transcription by RNA polymerase II; forebrain development
Sources:Amigo / QuickGO
Orthologs
Databases	NCBI: entry; OMA: entry
Species	Human	Mouse
Entrez	3337	81489
Ensembl	ENSG00000132002	ENSMUSG00000005483
UniProt	P25685	Q9QYJ3
RefSeq (mRNA)	NM_001313964; NM_001300914; NM_006145	NM_018808; NM_001308227
RefSeq (protein)	NP_001287843; NP_001300893; NP_006136	NP_001295156; NP_061278
Location (UCSC)	Chr 19: 14.51 – 14.56 Mb	Chr 8: 84.33 – 84.34 Mb
PubMed search
- Wikidata
View/Edit Human	View/Edit Mouse

DnaJ homolog subfamily B member 1 is a protein that in humans is encoded by the DNAJB1 gene.

A fusion protein of DNAJB1 and PRKACA drives fibrolamellar hepatocellular carcinoma, a type of rare liver cancer.

== Interactions ==
DNAJB1 has been shown to interact with:

- HSPA4, and
- STUB1
