= TheraSphere =

Radiotherapy cancer treatment

- Specialty: Interventional radiology

TheraSphere is a radiotherapy treatment for hepatocellular carcinoma (HCC) that consists of millions of microscopic, radioactive glass microspheres (20–30 micrometres in diameter) being infused into the arteries that feed liver tumors. These microspheres then embolize, lodging themselves in the liver's capillaries and bathing the malignancy in high levels of yttrium-90 radiation. It is currently approved as a Humanitarian Device, meaning effectiveness has not been proven, for patients as a neoadjuvant to surgery or transplantation by the U.S. Food and Drug Administration and is being used at a number of clinical centers in the United States.

== Description ==
TheraSphere consists of insoluble glass microspheres where yttrium-90 is an integral constituent of the glass. Each milligram contains between 22,000 and 73,000 microspheres. Yttrium-90 is a pure beta emitter (physical half-life of 64.2 hours or 2.67 days) and decays to stable zirconium-90. The average energy of the beta emissions from yttrium-90 is 0.9367 MeV.

The Therasphere package insert contains a Black Box warning concerning 5 Pre-treatment high risk factors associated with serious adverse events resulting in 11/12 deaths.

Following embolization of the yttrium-90 glass microspheres in tumorous liver tissue, the beta radiation emitted provides a therapeutic effect. The microspheres are delivered into the liver tumor through a catheter placed into the hepatic artery that supplies blood to the tumor. This is usually performed in a hospital's radiology suite and patients remain conscious throughout the procedure. The microspheres are unable to pass through the vasculature of the liver due to arteriolar capillary blockade and are trapped in the tumor. There they exert a local radiotherapeutic effect with some damage to surrounding normal liver tissue.

Therasphere was issued a Class 2 Device Recall from the FDA in October 2016.

== Efficacy ==
Low-risk patients with unresectable liver cancer appear to gain control over their malignancies for at least 2 years when treated with TheraSphere. They survived a median of 800 days compared with a median of 258 days for high risk patients (P <.0001) in a study of 140 patients (106 male). The patients underwent 238 administrations of the particles. Approximately 34% of patients responded to the treatment according to evaluation by Response Evaluation Criteria in Solid Tumors (RECIST), meaning their overall tumor burden decreased by 50% or more.

In a separate study based on follow-up data from 43 treated patients, 20 patients (47%) had an objective tumor response based on percent reduction in tumor size and 34 patients (79%) had a tumor response when percent reduction and/or tumor necrosis were used as a composite measure of tumor response.

== See also ==
- SIR-Spheres
- Sirtex
