= HSPA4 =

Protein-coding gene in the species Homo sapiens

Identifiers
- Aliases: HSPA4, APG-2, HEL-S-5a, HS24/P52, HSPH2, RY, hsp70, hsp70RY, heat shock protein family A (Hsp70) member 4
- External IDs: OMIM: 601113; MGI: 1342292; GeneCards: HSPA4

Gene location (Human)
Chr.	Chromosome 5 (human)
Band	5q31.1	Start	133,052,013 bp
Band	5q31.1	End	133,106,449 bp

Gene location (Mouse)
Chr.	Chromosome 11 (mouse)
Band	11 B1.3|11 31.91 cM	Start	53,150,641 bp
Band	11 B1.3|11 31.91 cM	End	53,191,284 bp
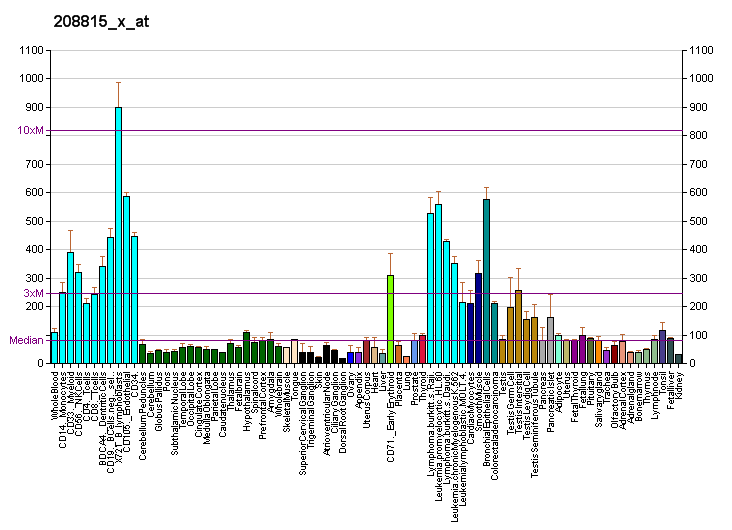

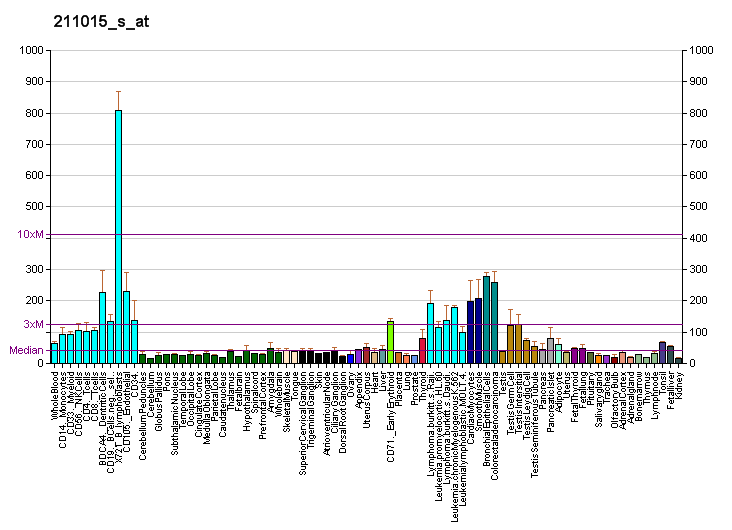

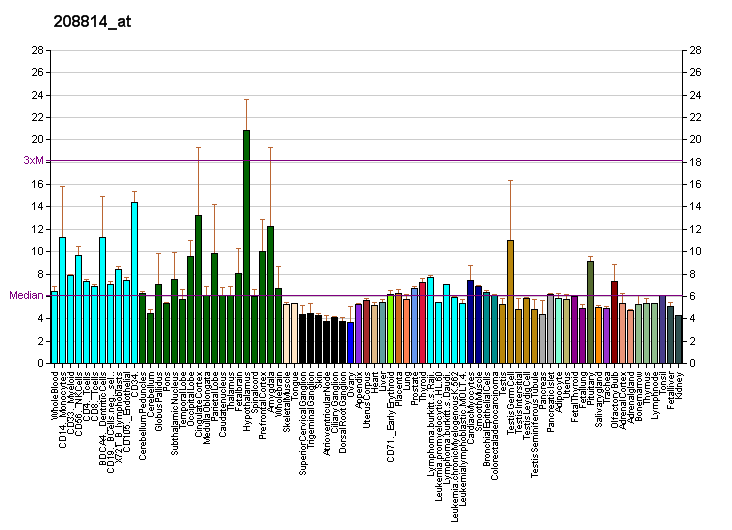
RNA expression pattern
Bgee	Human / Mouse (ortholog); Top expressed in: gonad; gingival epithelium; islet of Langerhans; right testis; left testis; mucosa of pharynx; stromal cell of endometrium; amniotic fluid; tendon of biceps brachii; tonsil / Top expressed in: otic placode; saccule; tail of embryo; genital tubercle; otic vesicle; primitive streak; epiblast; Ileal epithelium; trigeminal ganglion; endothelial cell of lymphatic vessel; More reference expression data
BioGPS	More reference expression data
Gene ontology
Molecular function	nucleotide binding; protein binding; ATP binding
Cellular component	cytoplasm; cytosol; extracellular exosome; nucleus
Biological process	response to unfolded protein; protein insertion into mitochondrial outer membrane; chaperone-mediated protein complex assembly
Sources:Amigo / QuickGO
Orthologs
Databases	NCBI: entry; OMA: entry
Species	Human	Mouse
Entrez	3308	15525
Ensembl	ENSG00000170606	ENSMUSG00000020361
UniProt	P34932	Q61316; Q3U2G2
RefSeq (mRNA)	NM_198431; NM_002154	NM_008300
RefSeq (protein)	NP_002145	NP_032326
Location (UCSC)	Chr 5: 133.05 – 133.11 Mb	Chr 11: 53.15 – 53.19 Mb
PubMed search
- Wikidata
View/Edit Human	View/Edit Mouse

Heat shock 70 kDa protein 4 is a protein that in humans is encoded by the HSPA4 gene.

The protein encoded by this gene was originally suggested to be a member of the heat shock protein 70 family. However it is now known that human HSPA4 is an equivalent to mouse the Apg-2 protein and is a member of the Hsp110 family.

== Interactions ==
HSPA4 has been shown to interact with:

- APAF1
- DNAJB1,
- HDAC1,
- HSF1,
- HSPBP1,
- Histone deacetylase 2,
- NAD(P)H dehydrogenase (quinone 1),
- STUB1, and
- TTC1.
