= LI-RADS =

LI Rads for the Classification of HCC

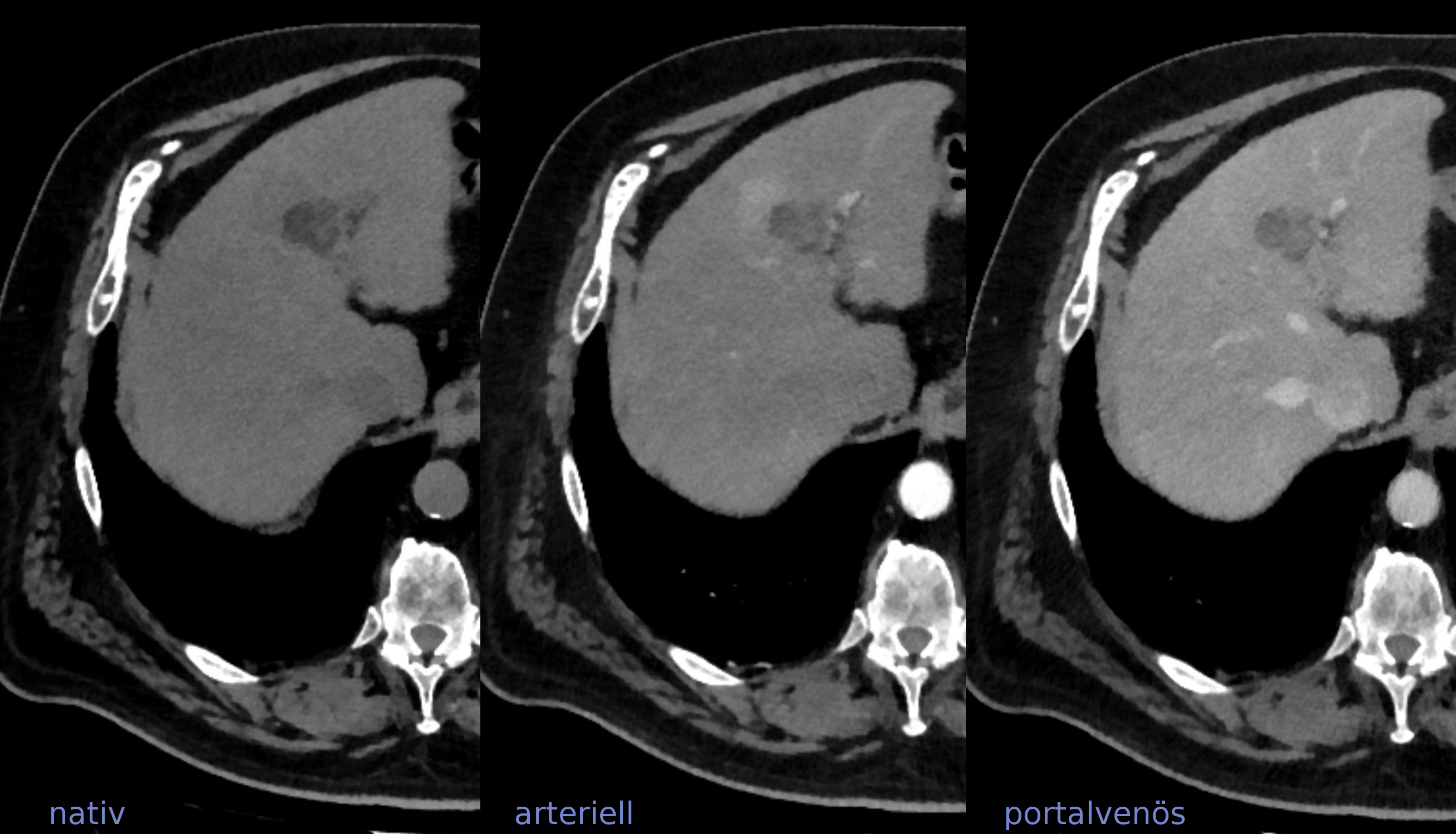
- LIRADS classification is applied to multi-phase contrast-enhanced CT or MRI scans in people with certain chronic liver diseases.
- Synonyms: Liver Reporting & Data System

The Liver Imaging Reporting and Data System (a.k.a. LI-RADS) is a quality assurance tool created and trademarked by the American College of Radiology in 2011 to standardize the reporting and data collection of CT and MR imaging patients at risk for hepatocellular carcinoma (HCC), or primary cancer of the liver cells. It provides a standardized framework for classification of liver lesions by a radiologist, and only applies in patients with chronic liver disease, the main risk factor for liver cancer. The hierarchical classification, from LR1 to LR5, is based on specific imaging features of the lesion in question, and corresponds to the degree of suspicion for malignancy. For example, a lesion with features corresponding to the highest category, LR5, is "definitely" HCC. Importantly, the increasing acceptance of the LI-RADS system of reporting by referring clinicians (chiefly oncologists, hepatobiliary and liver transplant surgeons) has reduced the need for tissue biopsy confirmation of cancer in patients with chronic liver disease.

The LI-RADS system has undergone two revisions, first in 2014, and again in July 2018.

In 2016, the ACR published a version of LI-RADS which applies to contrast-enhanced ultrasound imaging, termed CEUS LI-RADS.

== LI-RADS 2018 Version ==
LI-RADS v2018 makes some slight changes on the classification, improving the sensitivity of detecting small HCC (1~2cm)

== Role of LI-RADS in liver transplantation ==
The only potential curative treatment for hepatocellular carcinoma, assuming that the disease has not spread beyond the liver, is surgically removing the tumor from the body. In some cases, if the tumor is limited and the patient is healthy enough to tolerate surgery, the tumor may be successfully treated by resecting the affected part of the liver (partial hepatectomy). If the person is not a good candidate for surgical resection due advanced liver disease (commonly by Child-Pugh score), liver transplantation may still be a curative treatment option. Provided that the disease has not spread beyond the liver, then liver transplant effectively removes all cancer cells from the body, while also replacing the disease native liver with a better functioning transplant organ.

Liver transplantation has significant risks, including the risk of recurrent cancer. The outcomes and survival benefits of transplantation as treatment of HCC are highest when transplant is reserved for the "best" candidates which meet strict criteria. In addition to undergoing a complete medical and psychological evaluation, imaging assessment for extent of the cancer is an important component of eligibility for transplant. A landmark study in 1996 showed that both overall and recurrence-free survival following liver transplantation for cirrhosis and unresectable HCC was improved by limiting this treatment to disease that met certain strict criteria, now known as the Milan criteria. The criteria include assessment of size and number of active liver tumors, as well as the absence of invasion of large blood vessels. In the U.S., these Milan criteria are currently used by the Organ Procurement and Transplantation Network (OPTN) committee to evaluate transplant candidacy. Only persons with limited disease, as defined by the criteria, are considered for transplantation.

Potential candidates for liver transplantation for treatment of HCC are evaluated and re-evaluated periodically by repeated imaging tests as they wait for donor organ availability. So long as the cancer does not exceed Milan criteria, the person may remain a candidate for transplantation. Thus, accurate and consistent evaluation of the disease burden is critical. For example, if someone with three small HCC lesions develops a new fourth liver nodule, an unequivocal diagnosis of this lesion as cancerous would disqualify this person from transplant candidacy.

The 5 tiers of the LI-RADS reporting system are designed to correspond to the 5 tier classification recommended by the United Network for Organ Sharing (UNOS) which administers OPTN. For all intents and purposes, OPTN/UNOS classes 1-5 correspond to LI-RADS 1-5 classification, although there are some small differences:

- OPTN class 0 (incomplete or technically inadequate imaging study) has no corresponding LI-RADS category.
- OPTN system divides OPTN class 5 into sub-classes corresponding to tumor size and treatment status (OPTN 5A, 5B, 5X, and 5T)
- LI-RADS system includes several subtleties and ancillary "tie breaking" rules which may alter lesion classification

Although there are 5 levels of classification, the most significant and only actionable classification is LI-RADS or OPTN/UNOS 5, which indicates that a nodule is "definitely" cancer. The UNOS-OPTN recommendations to not provide guidance on liver nodules which do not meet these strict criteria for malignancy.

== LI-RADS Calculators and Report Generators ==
While the American College of Radiology (ACR) does not officially endorse specific calculators, some tools have been developed to streamline the application of LI-RADS criteria. These calculators assist radiologists in categorizing liver lesions more efficiently and consistently. Free calculators are available for LI-RADS to the public, which are gaining popularity for their ability to simplify complex diagnostic processes. Additionally, report generators for LI-RADS CT/MRI and LI-RADS CEUS treatment response assessments facilitate structured and standardized reporting.

== Automatic extraction using Machine Learning ==
Natural language processing tool available for computation of LI-RADS assessment category from the findings recorded in the textual radiology reports (documented without LI-RADS template) which may enable standardizing screening recommendations and treatment planning of patients at risk for hepatocellular carcinoma by using same scoring criteria. In addition, such system may facilitate AI-based healthcare research with images by offering large scale text mining and data gathering opportunities from standard hospital clinical data repositories.
