= Sirtex =

Medical cancer treatment company

Sirtex Medical Limited
- Company type: Private
- Founded: 1997
- Headquarters: Woburn, MA
- Products: SIR-Spheres yttrium-90 resin microspheres
- Owner: China Grand Pharmaceutical and Healthcare Holdings Ltd./CDH Genetech, Ltd.
- Number of employees: 1000
- Website: www.sirtex.com

Sirtex Medical Limited is a medical device firm that offers radioactive treatment for inoperable liver cancer called SIR-Spheres microspheres. Sirtex was founded in 1997 in Australia. It has offices and production facilities in the U.S., Australia, Germany, and Singapore. Following its acquisition by China Grand Pharmaceutical and CDH Genetech, Sirtex delisted from the Australian Securities Exchange (ASX:SRX) on Monday, September 24, 2018.

The company is currently headed by Kevin R. Smith, who was appointed as CEO on October 16, 2019.

== SIR-Spheres & microspheres mechanisms ==
When SIR-Sphere microspheres are used to treat liver cancer, the treatment is called selective internal radiation therapy (called SIRT). This is a relatively new treatment option for people suffering from inoperable liver cancer. SIR-Spheres are very small radioactive beads about one-third the size of a human hair that are injected into tumours within the liver.

== Medical uses ==
The radioactive microspheres have a half-life of about 64 hours. They are administered by a trained interventional radiologist who specialises in minimally invasive, targeted treatments. The procedure is usually performed under local sedation. A small incision is made in the patient's groin, and a flexible catheter is guided into the liver through the femoral artery in the leg up to the tumour sites. The catheter is moved through the hepatic artery and positioned by the interventional radiologist to allow for targeted infusion of the SIR-Spheres microspheres to the site of the tumors. The microspheres take approximately 15 minutes to be infused, with the whole procedure taking about an hour. Most patients are discharged within 24 hours.

== Cancers treated ==
=== Primary liver cancer ===
Primary liver cancer, also known as hepatocellular carcinoma (HCC), is the most frequent type of liver cancer, accounting for approximately 90% of the primary malignant liver tumours in adults. Liver cancer is the sixth most prevalent malignancy and the third greatest cause of cancer-related deaths worldwide. Every year, around 600,000 instances of liver cancer are diagnosed around the world. This includes around 19,000 in the US, 54,000 in Europe, and 390,000 in China, Korea, and Japan. The incidence of HCC is rising in Asia as chronic infection with Hepatitis B and C becomes more common. Additional risk factors include iron overload, alcoholic cirrhosis and some congenital disorders. Patients with liver cancer had a lower fiver-year survival rate than those with other cancer types.

=== Metastatic colorectal cancer ===
Colorectal cancer (CRC), often known as colon cancer or large bowel cancer, is the third highest cause of cancer-related deaths in the western world. Each year, an estimated 1.6 million people are diagnosed with the condition around the world. An estimated 50% of CRC patients will develop liver metastases. Sirtex targets metastatic colorectal cancer (mCRC) via SIR-Sphere microspheres. It has been thought that in 30-40% of individuals with severe illness, the liver is the only site of dissemination.

At presentation, 20-25% of patients will have clinically identifiable liver metastases, and up to 50% of all patients develop liver metastases develop liver metastases within three years of primary tumor removal. On average, 25% of patients with metastatic liver disease are eligible for liver resection surgery, which is the only possible cure available to them. The remaining patients are eligible for alternative treatments such as chemotherapy and SIR-Sphere microspheres.

== Research and development ==
Sirtex is currently looking at new ways to treat other forms of cancer using the SIR-Spheres technology. This research is taking place at the Australian National University (ANU) and several institutions in the US and Europe. Sirtex is also working to develop a new technology that will help improve the treatment and survival of cancer patients. At present, this is focused on the three areas listed below.

1. Targeted Hyperthermia – Preparation for pre-clinical studies started in 2009 with the Australian National University in Canberra, the University of Sydney, and other institutions. The aim is to establish if heating tumours will increase the effectiveness of SIR-Spheres.
2. Hollow Microspheres – Sirtex has exclusive worldwide rights to hollow, biodegradable microsphere technology developed by the University of New South Wales (UNSW). The company is investigating if hollow microspheres can be used to deliver a range of therapeutic agents, including chemotherapy drugs.
3. Radioprotector Technology – Sirtex and the Peter MacCallum Cancer Centre in Melbourne have developed a compound that protects the skin from the effects of exposure to radiation. This has potential benefit for a wide range of cancer patients. It could also expand the number of patients able to be treated with SIR-Sphere microspheres. It may also be used to help protect patients with head, breast, or neck cancer from external beam radiation during treatment.

Results from the largest, most comprehensive study to date evaluating SIRT in liver metastases from colorectal cancer were presented at ASCO in 2012, ASCO-GI 2013, and ASCO in 2014. The various subsets of the MORE study, led by Andrew S. Kennedy, M.D., Physician in Chief, Radiation Oncology, Sarah Cannon Research Institute, Nashville, Tenn., have demonstrated safety and efficacy as well as the same in treating the elderly. The most recent set of data presented at ASCO in 2014 documented the ability to predict the success of SIRT using standard laboratory tests prior to treatment.

In addition, the global SIRFLOX study, which completed patient recruitment in 2013, will evaluate SIR-Sphere microspheres as a first-line treatment for colorectal liver metastases.

== Reimbursement ==
SIR-Sphere microspheres are regulated as a medical device. The product was approved for sale in the US in March 2002. The US Centers for Medicare and Medicaid Services (CMS) currently reimburse SIR-Spheres microspheres under Medicare Code C2616.

SIR-Spheres are covered in Australia by private insurers and reimbursed under Medicare.

In Europe, SIR-Sphere microspheres are regulated under the Active Implantable Medical Device Directive. The product received CE Mark approval in October 2002.

In the UK, patients treated with SIR-Spheres were either self-funded, had private medical insurance, or had the microspheres donated by Sirtex. A small number have been approved by the National Health Service (NHS). This is partly due to formal guidance documentation provided by the National Institute for Clinical Excellence (NICE), which questioned the clinical benefits of SIR-Sphere microspheres requiring patient consent. Since 2013, it has been mandatory for NHS organisations in the UK to provide funding for medicines and treatment as recommended by NICE. A favourable review will see the National Health Service pay for treatment across the UK and help reimbursement in other EU countries.

== Financial performance ==
On 3 September 2013, Sirtex announced that dose sales of SIR-Spheres microspheres grew a solid 21 percent, with more than 4,750 doses being supplied in the Americas for the year ending June 30, 2013. Globally, revenue was $100 million Australian dollars, up 16 percent from 2012, with a net profit after tax of AU$18 million. Dose sales of SIR-Spheres microspheres grew 19 percent in fiscal year 2013, with Asia Pacific reporting growth of 29 percent and Europe, the Middle East, and Africa increasing nine percent. Sirtex plans to triple manufacturing capacity in 2014 with new facilities in Germany and the U.S.

== See also ==
- SIR-Spheres
- Microsphere
- Selective Internal Radiation Therapy
- Radiation therapy
