= TTC1 =

Protein-coding gene in humans

Identifiers
- Aliases: TTC1, TPR1, tetratricopeptide repeat domain 1
- External IDs: OMIM: 601963; MGI: 1914077; GeneCards: TTC1

Gene location (Human)
Chr.	Chromosome 5 (human)
Band	5q33.3	Start	160,009,113 bp
Band	5q33.3	End	160,065,543 bp

Gene location (Mouse)
Chr.	Chromosome 11 (mouse)
Band	11|11 B1.1	Start	43,620,339 bp
Band	11|11 B1.1	End	43,638,835 bp
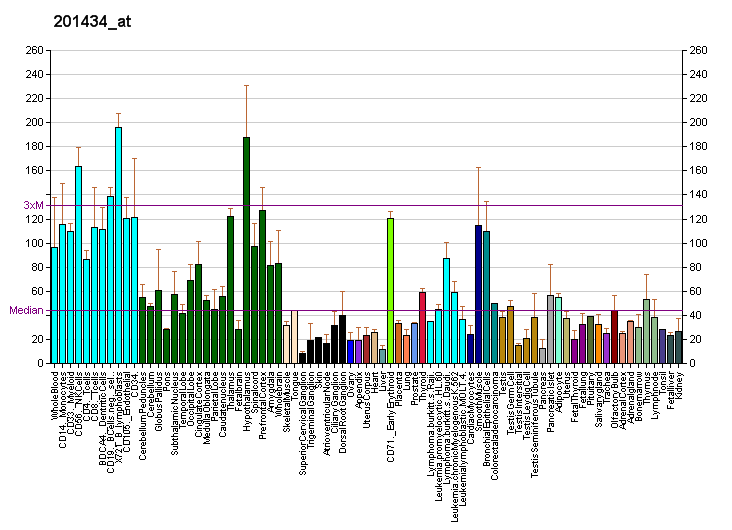
RNA expression pattern
Bgee	Human / Mouse (ortholog); Top expressed in: apex of heart; Achilles tendon; cingulate gyrus; left ventricle; anterior cingulate cortex; right frontal lobe; C1 segment; Brodmann area 9; prefrontal cortex; islet of Langerhans / Top expressed in: blastocyst; genital tubercle; tail of embryo; morula; spermatocyte; spermatid; secondary oocyte; muscle of thigh; zygote; yolk sac; More reference expression data
BioGPS	More reference expression data
Gene ontology
Molecular function	unfolded protein binding; protein binding
Cellular component	peroxisomal membrane; cytosol
Biological process	protein folding
Sources:Amigo / QuickGO
Orthologs
Databases	NCBI: entry; OMA: entry
Species	Human	Mouse
Entrez	7265	66827
Ensembl	ENSG00000113312	ENSMUSG00000041278
UniProt	Q99614	Q91Z38
RefSeq (mRNA)	NM_003314; NM_001282500	NM_133795
RefSeq (protein)	NP_001269429; NP_003305	NP_598556
Location (UCSC)	Chr 5: 160.01 – 160.07 Mb	Chr 11: 43.62 – 43.64 Mb
PubMed search
- Wikidata
View/Edit Human	View/Edit Mouse

Tetratricopeptide repeat protein 1 is a protein that in humans is encoded by the TTC1 gene.

== Interactions ==
TTC1 has been shown to interact with HSPA4.
