= Fibrolamellar hepatocellular carcinoma =

- Other names: FHCC
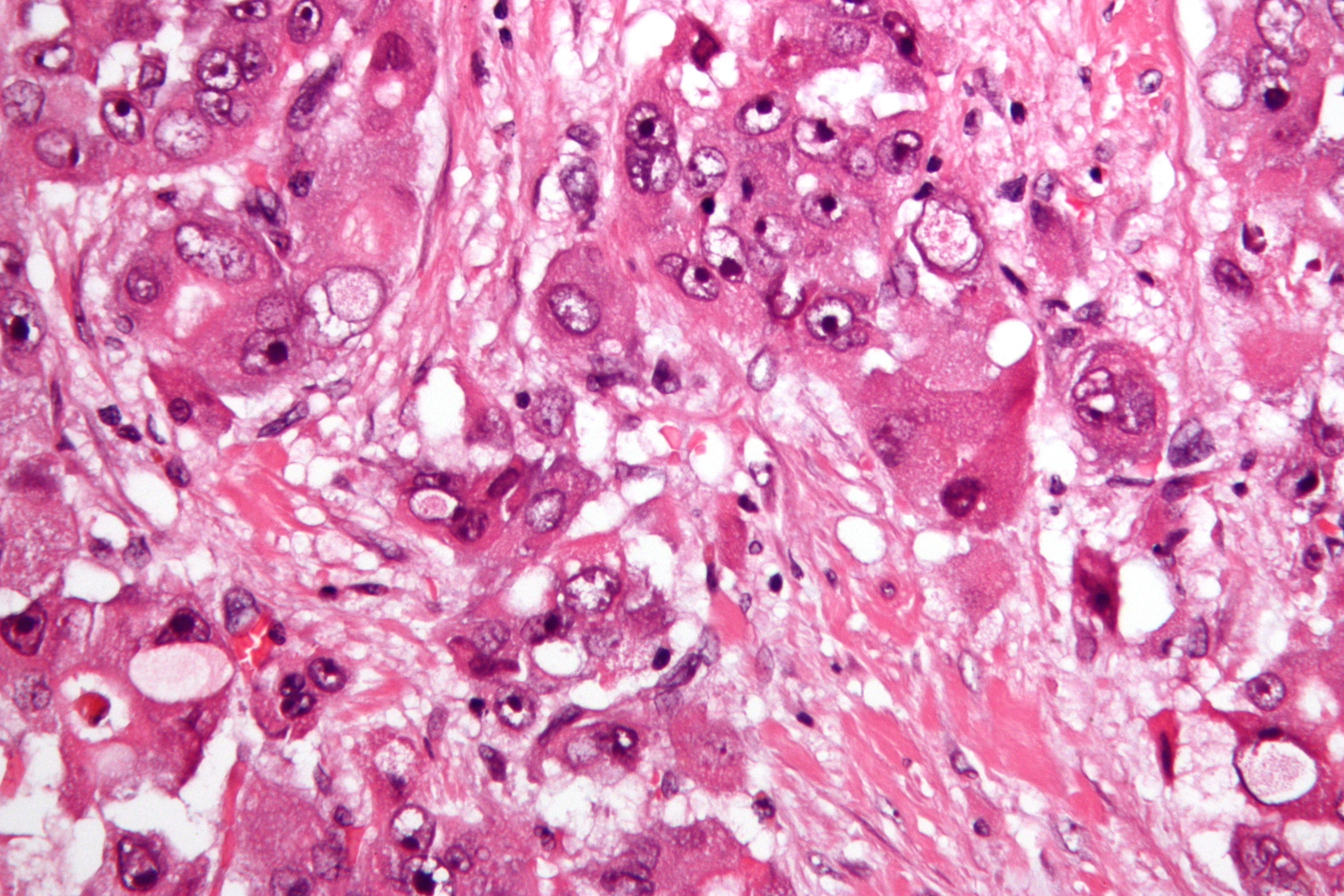
- Micrograph of fibrolamellar hepatocarcinoma showing the characteristic laminated fibrosis between the tumor cells with a low NC ratio. H&E stain.
- Specialty: Oncology
- Frequency: 0.0001%

Fibrolamellar carcinoma (FLC) is a rare form of carcinoma that typically affects young adults and is characterized, under the microscope, by laminated fibrous layers interspersed between the tumor cells. It has been estimated that 200 new cases are diagnosed worldwide each year. However, in light of recent advances in our molecular understanding, this has recently been revised to suggest it may be at least ten times more common. FLC, also known as fibrolamellar hepatocellular carcinoma, is different from the more common hepatocellular carcinoma (HCC) in that it afflicts young people with normal liver function and no known risk factors.

== Cause ==
A 2014 study showed the presence of the DNAJB1-PRKACA chimeric transcript (resulting from a 400kb somatic deletion on chromosome 19) in 100% of the FLCs examined (15/15). This gene fusion has been confirmed in many other studies. That this genomic deletion is sufficient to produce FLC was shown by creating this deletion, and formation of the DNAJB1::PRKACA chimeric gene, using CRISPR/Cas9 in the livers of mice. That the actual formation of the DNAJB1::PRKACA was responsible, and not the deletion, was shown by expression of the DNAJB1::PRKACA from a transposon. To determine if the DNAJB1::PRKACA was only involved in triggering the tumor, or if it continued to drive the tumor, a small hairpin RNA was used to eliminate the DNAJB1::PRKACA. The tumors died, which demonstrated not only that DNAJB1::PRKACA is continuing to drive FLC, but that the tumor has become oncogenically addicted.

== Pathology ==
The histopathology of FLC is characterized by laminated fibrous layers, interspersed between the tumor cells. Cytologically, the tumor cells have a low nuclear to cytoplasmic ratio with abundant eosinophilic cytoplasm. Tumors are non-encapsulated, but well circumscribed, when compared to conventional HCC (which typically has an invasive border).

== Diagnosis ==
Due to lack of symptoms, until the tumor is sizable, this form of cancer is often advanced when diagnosed. Symptoms include vague abdominal pain, nausea, abdominal fullness, malaise and weight loss. They may also include a palpable liver mass. Other presentations include jaundice, ascites, fulminant liver failure, encephalopathy, gynecomastia (males only), thrombophlebitis of the lower limbs, recurrent deep vein thrombosis, anemia and hypoglycemia.

The usual markers for liver disease – aspartate aminotransferase, alanine aminotransferase and alkaline phosphatase – are often normal or only slightly elevated. FLC often does not produce alpha fetoprotein (AFP), a widely used marker for conventional hepatocellular carcinoma. In a subset of FLC patients elevated plasma neurotensin levels may be present. Likewise, in a subset of FLC patients, elevated serum vitamin B12 binding globulin levels may be present.

Diagnosis is normally made by imaging (ultrasound, CT or MRI) and biopsy. However, even with a biopsy, there is often disagreement over the diagnosis. Since the characterization of the DNAJB1::PRKACA fusion, the most reliable diagnosis is through molecular characterization such as PCR to detect the fusion, or genomic sequencing, or using a fluorescent in-situ hybridization.

== Treatment ==
FLC can often be surgically removed. Liver resection is the optimal treatment and may need to be performed more than once, since this disease has a very high recurrence rate. Due to such recurrence, periodic follow-up medical imaging (CT or MRI) is necessary.

When the tumor cannot be removed surgically or when there is distant spread, many different systemic therapies are currently being used to treat the disease. However, no standard of care currently exists for FLC. Consequently, there remains a pressing need to identify proven, effective systemic therapies for the cancer. Radiotherapy has been used but data is limited concerning its use.

The Fibrolamellar Registry, a patient and family run medical registry has collected data from over 250 patients. This work has been used in multiple publications which include extended information on patient outcomes, efficacy of immune checkpoint inhibitors, efficacy of specific drugs and understanding the basis of high ammonia in FLC.

The survival rate for FLC largely depends on whether (and to what degree) the cancer has metastasized, i.e. spread to the lymph nodes or other organs. Distant spread (metastases), significantly reduces the median survival rate. Five-year survival rates vary between 40 and 90%.

== Epidemiology ==
FLC accounts for 1–10% of primary liver cancers. It typically has a young age at presentation when compared to conventional HCC. Previously it was estimated to be 20–40 years, mean ages 27 years, but when analysis is restricted to those patients who are confirmed with a molecular test to have FLC, the age range is 10-40 and mean age of 21 years. Unlike the more common HCC, patients most often do not have coexistent liver disease such as cirrhosis.

== History ==
This disease was first described by Hugh Edmondson in a 14-year-old female with no underlying liver disease. The name fibrolamellar hepatocellular carcinoma was coined by Craig et al. in 1980. It was not recognized as a distinct form of cancer by the WHO until 2010.

Starting in 2010, some patients and their family members started to examine the molecular basis of FLC. They gathered samples through social media, sequenced the genome, and analyzed the immunological response. Since there are few patients at any one institution, they formed their own medical registry called the Fibrolamellar Registry, which allowed them to follow patients as they changed institutions. This work led to the identification of the chimeric fusion driver and the first characterization of the transcriptome and proteome. The work was heralded by Francis Collins when he presented to the Senate Appropriations committee and was used by President Obama at the launch of The Precision Medicine Initiative at the White House.

== Additional images ==
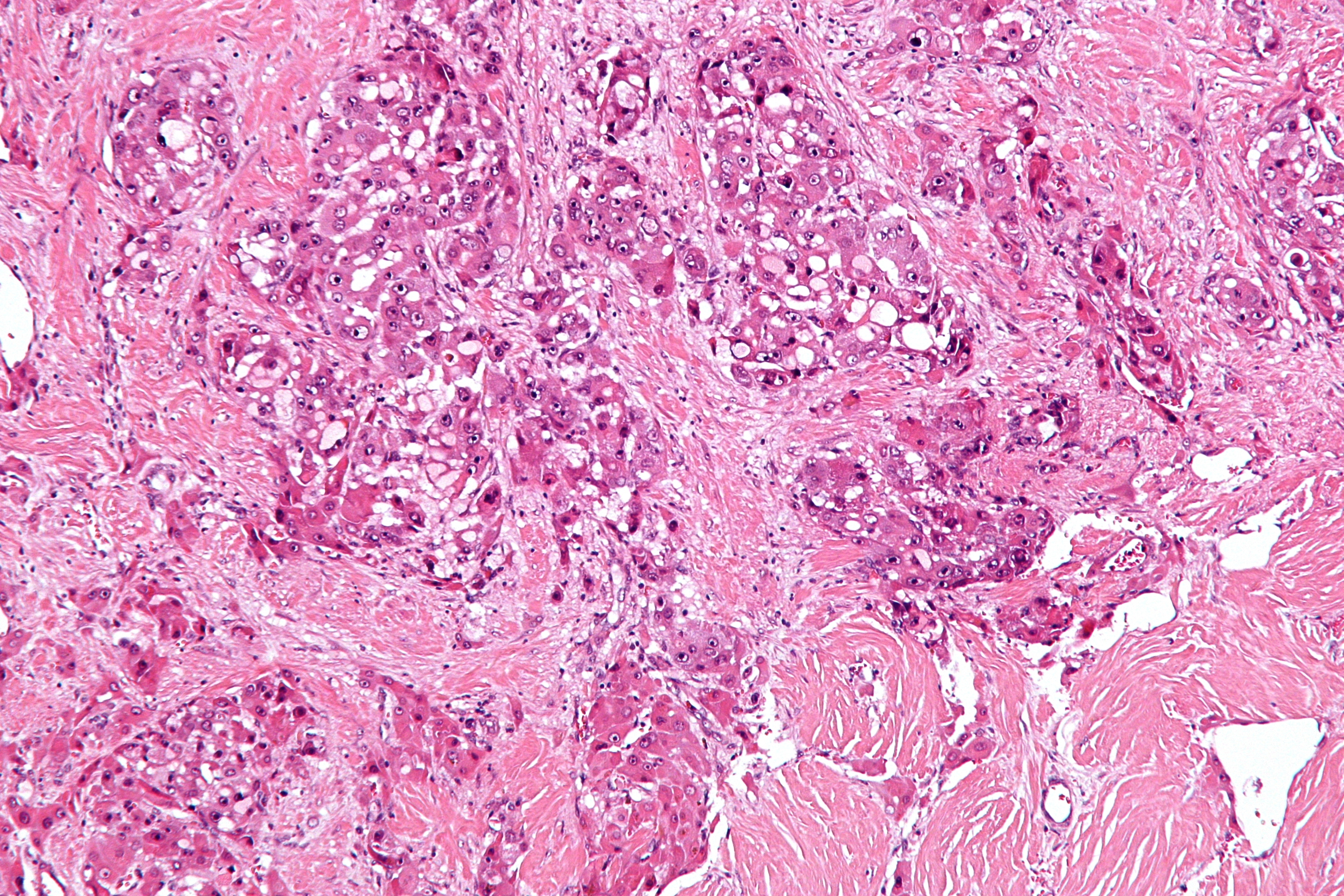
Intermed. mag.

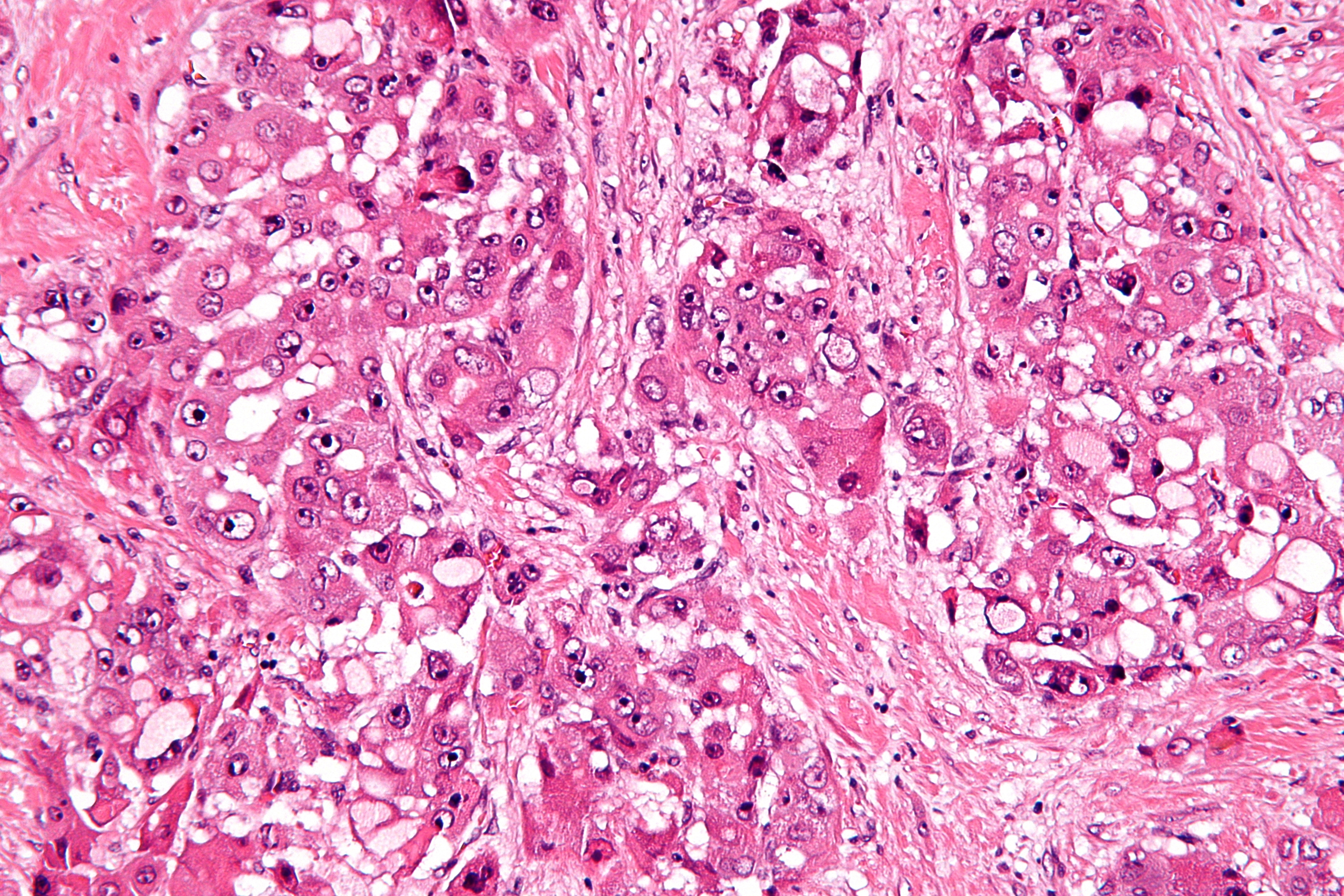
High mag.
