= Fibrolamellar Registry =

American non-profit organisation

- Formation: June 1, 2014; 12 years ago
- Founder: Barbara Lyons, Rachael Migler, Elana Simon, Sanford Simon, Gail Trecosta
- Legal status: 501(c)(3) nonprofit organization
- Purpose: Fibrolamellar hepatocellular carcinoma
- Chairman,President: Dr. Sandy Simon
- Website: fibroregistry.org//

The Fibrolamellar Registry is a 501(c)(3) non-profit organization in the United States established to bring together patients with Fibrolamellar carcinoma (FLC) and their families along with scientists and clinicians to achieve the goal of developing a diagnostic test and cure. Since FLC is a rare pediatric liver cancer, the Fibrolamellar Registry helps connect data across institutions and hospitals. The Fibrolamellar Registry does not fundraise for research.

== History ==
The Registry was established in 2014 by Elana Simon along with other FLC survivors as an open-sourced data repository. The Registry is governed by patients and their families. Researchers and clinicians are allowed to use the collected data for free to advance understanding of FLC.

The Registry uses a questionnaire with 600 questions, which go beyond the standard medical record to supply a rich data set for researchers and clinicians to use. The data from the Registry was used to support three research articles published in 2022 and another published in 2023.

In addition to providing data to support new research, the Registry helps patients with FLC understand their disease through plain language summaries of new research papers and tutorials on how to properly search the online biomedical database PubMed.

As of 2024, the Registry has 250 participants from 21 countries which represents over 100,000 data points.

== Significance ==
The Fibrolamellar Registry is one of the first registries run by patients and their families rather than hospitals or universities. As such, the Registry has served as a model for patient-run registries for other rare cancers such as uveal melanoma. The Registry has also connected patients directly with researchers, which has allowed some patients to research their own cancers in the lab.
