= Percutaneous ethanol injection =

Medical procedure

Percutaneous ethanol injection is a possible treatment for hepatocellular carcinoma.

Also used for thyroid and parathyroid disease.

Instead of removing unwanted tissue surgically it is killed with alcohol.It is similar in mechanism to Alcohol septal ablation for heart problems.

== See also ==
- Transcatheter arterial chemoembolization
