= SIR-Spheres =

Cancer treatment

SIR-Spheres microspheres are used to treat patients with unresectable liver cancer. These are mostly patients with hepatocellular carcinoma (HCC), metastatic colorectal cancer (mCRC), or metastatic neuroendocrine tumours (mNET).

Therapy goals are local disease control, downstaging to resection, bridging to transplantation, and extended survival.

== Description ==
SIR-Spheres microspheres contain resin based microspheres with an average diameter between 20 and 60 micrometre. The microspheres are impregnated with ^{90}Y, a beta radiating isotope of yttrium with a half-life of 64.1 hours.

== Mode of action ==
Once injected into the hepatic artery via a catheter by an interventional radiologist the microspheres will preferably lodge in the vasculature of the tumour. The radiation will lead to damage of tumour tissue and, in the best case to a complete elimination of the tumour. Due to the half-life almost all of the radiation is delivered within two weeks. After one month almost no radioactivity will remain.

The procedure is also known as selective internal radiation therapy (SIRT) or radioembolization.

== See also ==
- TheraSphere
- Sirtex
