= Hepatocellular carcinoma =

Common type of liver cancer

- Other names: Hepatoma
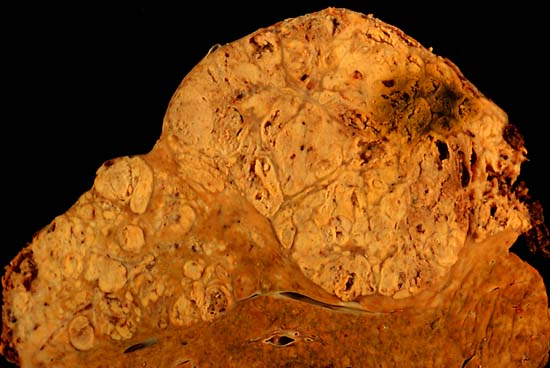
- Hepatocellular carcinoma in an individual who was hepatitis C positive; autopsy specimen
- Specialty: Oncology
- Symptoms: Loss of appetite, jaundice, nausea and vomiting, itching
- Risk factors: Hepatitis B, hepatitis C, alcohol use disorder, cirrhosis, smoking

Hepatocellular carcinoma (HCC) is the most common type of primary liver cancer in adults and is currently the most common cause of death in people with cirrhosis. HCC is the third leading cause of cancer-related deaths worldwide.

HCC most commonly occurs in those with chronic liver disease especially those with cirrhosis or fibrosis, which occur in the setting of chronic liver injury and inflammation. HCC is rare in those without chronic liver disease. Chronic liver diseases which greatly increase the risk of HCC include hepatitis infection such as (hepatitis B, C or D), non-alcoholic steatohepatitis (NASH), alcoholic liver disease, or exposure to toxins such as aflatoxin, or pyrrolizidine alkaloids.Certain diseases, such as hemochromatosis and alpha 1-antitrypsin deficiency, markedly increase the risk of developing HCC. The five-year survival in those with HCC is 18%.

As with any cancer, the treatment and prognosis of HCC varies depending on tumor histology, size, how far the cancer has spread, and overall health of the person.

The vast majority of HCC cases and the lowest survival rates after treatment occur in Asia and sub-Saharan Africa, in countries where hepatitis B infection is endemic and many are infected from birth. The incidence of HCC in the United States and other higher income countries is increasing due to an increase in hepatitis C virus infections. The incidence of HCC due to NASH has also risen sharply in the past 20 years, with NASH being the fastest growing cause of HCC. This is thought to be due to an increased prevalence of NASH, as well as its risk factors of diabetes and obesity, in higher income countries. It is more than three times as common in males as in females, for unknown reasons.

== Signs and symptoms ==
Most cases of HCC occur in people who already have signs and symptoms of chronic liver disease. They may present with worsening symptoms or without symptoms at the time of cancer detection. HCC may present with non-specific symptoms such as abdominal pain, nausea, vomiting, or feeling tired. Some symptoms that are more closely associated with liver disease include jaundice, abdominal swelling due to fluid in the abdominal cavity, easy bruising from blood clotting abnormalities, loss of appetite, unintentional weight loss, abdominal pain, nausea, vomiting, or feeling tired.

== Risk factors ==
Since HCC mostly occurs in people with cirrhosis of the liver, risk factors generally include factors which cause chronic liver disease that may lead to cirrhosis. Certain risk factors are more highly associated with HCC than others. For example, while heavy alcohol consumption is estimated to cause 60–70% of cirrhosis, the vast majority of HCC occurs in cirrhosis attributed to viral hepatitis (although there may be overlap). Recognized risk factors include:

- Chronic viral hepatitis (estimated cause of 80% cases globally)
  - Chronic hepatitis B (about 50% cases)
  - Chronic hepatitis C (about 25% cases)
- Toxins:
  - Alcohol use disorder: the most common cause of cirrhosis
  - Aflatoxin
  - Iron overload state (hemochromatosis)
  - Pyrrolizidine alkaloids
- Metabolic:
  - Nonalcoholic steatohepatitis: up to 20% progress to cirrhosis
  - Metabolic dysfunction–associated steatotic liver disease (MASLD)
  - Type 2 diabetes (probably aided by obesity)
- Congenital disorders:
  - Alpha 1-antitrypsin deficiency
  - Wilson's disease (controversial; while some theorise the risk increases, case studies are rare and suggest the opposite where Wilson's disease actually may confer protection)
  - Hemophilia, although statistically associated with higher risk of HCC, this is due to coincident chronic viral hepatitis infection related to repeated blood transfusions over lifetime.

The significance of these risk factors varies globally. In regions where hepatitis B infection is endemic, such as southeast China, hepatitis B is the predominant cause. In populations largely protected by hepatitis B vaccination, such as the United States, HCC is most often linked to causes of cirrhosis such as chronic hepatitis C, obesity, and excessive alcohol use.

Certain benign liver tumors, such as hepatocellular adenoma, may sometimes be associated with coexisting malignant HCC. Evidence is limited for the true incidence of malignancy associated with benign adenomas; however, the size of hepatic adenoma is considered to correspond to risk of malignancy and so larger tumors may be surgically removed. Certain subtypes of adenoma, particularly those with β-catenin activation mutation, are particularly associated with increased risk of HCC.

Chronic liver disease is rare in children and adolescents; however, congenital liver disorders are associated with an increased the chance of developing HCC. Specifically, children with biliary atresia, infantile cholestasis, glycogen-storage diseases, and other cirrhotic diseases of the liver are predisposed to developing HCC in childhood.

Young adults afflicted by the rare fibrolamellar variant of hepatocellular carcinoma may have none of the typical risk factors, such as cirrhosis and hepatitis.

=== Diabetes mellitus ===
The risk of hepatocellular carcinoma in type 2 diabetics is greater (from 2.5 to 7.1 times the nondiabetic risk) depending on the duration of diabetes and treatment protocol. A suspected contributor to this increased risk is circulating insulin concentration such that diabetics with poor insulin control or on treatments that elevate their insulin output (both states that contribute to a higher circulating insulin concentration) show far greater risk of hepatocellular carcinoma than diabetics on treatments that reduce circulating insulin concentration. On this note, some diabetics who engage in tight insulin control (by keeping it from being elevated) show risk levels low enough to be indistinguishable from the general population. This phenomenon is thus not isolated to diabetes mellitus type 2, since poor insulin regulation is also found in other conditions such as metabolic syndrome (specifically, when evidence of metabolic dysfunction–associated steatotic liver disease (MASLD) is present) and again evidence of greater risk exists here, too. While there are claims that anabolic steroid abusers are at greater risk (theorized to be due to insulin and IGF exacerbation), the only evidence that has been confirmed is that anabolic steroid users are more likely to have the benign hepatocellular adenomas transform into the more dangerous hepatocellular carcinoma.

== Pathogenesis ==
Hepatocellular carcinoma, like any other cancer, develops when epigenetic alterations and mutations affecting the cellular machinery cause the cell to replicate at a higher rate and/or result in the cell avoiding apoptosis. In particular, chronic infections of hepatitis B and/or C can aid the development of hepatocellular carcinoma by repeatedly causing the body's own immune system to attack the liver cells, some of which are infected by the virus, others merely bystanders. Activated immune-system inflammatory cells release free radicals, such as reactive oxygen species and nitric oxide reactive species, which in turn can cause DNA damage and lead to carcinogenic gene mutations. Reactive oxygen species also cause epigenetic alterations at the sites of DNA repair.

Many genes responsible for cell proliferation, apoptosis or cell senescence and differentiation are commonly mutated in HCC and are implicated in tumor formation. Mutations in the telomerase reverse transcriptase (TERT) promoter are seen in 47–60% of HCC cases. The HBV genome commonly inserts into hepatocytes' TERT promoter site contributing to oncogenesis. These mutations in the promoter of TERT lead to a constitutively active telomerase which maintains telomere length and contributes to cell immortality. Mutations in the tumor suppressor gene TP53 are seen in about 30% of cases of HCC. And mutations in Wnt signalling (which is responsible for embryogenesis and cell homeostasis) are also seen in HCC, specifically CTNNB1 mutations seen in 30% of cases and AXIN1 mutations seen in 10% of cases. Mutations of genes involved in chromatin remodeling such as ARID1A and ARID2 are also seen in 10% and 5% of HCC cases respectively.

While this constant cycle of damage followed by repair can lead to mistakes during repair, which in turn lead to carcinogenesis, this hypothesis is more applicable, at present, to hepatitis C. Chronic hepatitis C causes HCC through the stage of cirrhosis. In chronic hepatitis B, however, the integration of the viral genome into infected cells can directly induce a noncirrhotic liver to develop HCC. Alternatively, repeated consumption of large amounts of ethanol can have a similar effect. The toxin aflatoxin from certain Aspergillus species of fungi is a carcinogen and aids carcinogenesis of hepatocellular cancer by building up in the liver. The combined high prevalence of rates of aflatoxin and hepatitis B in settings such as China and West Africa has led to relatively high rates of hepatocellular carcinoma in these regions. Other viral hepatitides such as hepatitis A have no potential to become a chronic infection, thus are not related to HCC.

Bile salts from the hepatocyte cytoplasm are transferred by the bile salt export pump into the bile canaliculi. A deficiency in bile salt export resulting from a mutation in the gene ABCB11 (ATP-binding cassette, subfamily B member 11) that encodes the bile salt export pump can result in intrahepatic toxic accumulation of bile salts. Individuals with such mutations have an increased incidence of hepatocellular carcinoma or cholangiocarcinoma (bile duct cancer).

== Diagnosis ==
Methods of diagnosis in HCC have evolved with the improvement in medical imaging. The evaluation of both asymptomatic patients and those with symptoms of liver disease involves blood testing and imaging evaluation. Historically, a biopsy of a tumor was required to prove an HCC diagnosis. However, imaging (especially MRI) findings may be conclusive enough without histopathologic confirmation.

=== Screening ===
HCC remains associated with a high mortality rate, in part because initial diagnosis commonly occurs at an advanced stage of disease. As with other cancers, outcomes are significantly improved if treatment is initiated earlier in the disease process. Since the vast majority of HCC cases occur in people with certain chronic liver diseases, especially those with cirrhosis, liver cancer screening is recommended in this population. In the United States, the American Association for the Study of Liver Diseases (AASLD) recommends ultrasound screenings every six months for people with cirrhosis, with or without measurement of blood levels of the tumor marker alpha-fetoprotein (AFP). Elevated levels of AFP are associated with active HCC disease, though their reliability can be inconsistent. At levels >20, sensitivity is 41–65% and specificity is 80–94%. However, at levels >200, sensitivity is 31% and specificity is 99%.

On ultrasound, HCC often appears as a small hypoechoic lesion with poorly defined margins and coarse, irregular internal echoes. When the tumor grows, it can sometimes appear heterogeneous with fibrosis, fatty change, and calcifications. This heterogeneity can look similar to cirrhosis and the surrounding liver parenchyma. A systematic review found that the sensitivity was 60% and specificity was 97% as compared with pathologic examination of an explanted or resected liver as the reference standard. The sensitivity increases to 79% with AFP correlation. Hepatic nodules that are less than 1 centimeter in size on surveillance ultrasound require serial imaging to ensure stability and to monitor for potential transformation to HCC.

Controversy remains as to the most effective screening protocols. For example, while some data support decreased mortality related to screening people with hepatitis B infection, the AASLD notes, "There are no randomized trials [for screening] in Western populations with cirrhosis secondary to chronic hepatitis C or fatty liver disease, and thus there is some controversy surrounding whether surveillance truly leads to a reduction in mortality in this population of patients with cirrhosis."

=== Higher risk people ===
In a person where a higher suspicion of HCC exists, such as a person with symptoms or abnormal blood tests (i.e. alpha-fetoprotein and des-gamma carboxyprothrombin levels), evaluation requires imaging of the liver by CT or MRI scans. Optimally, these scans are performed with intravenous contrast in multiple phases of hepatic perfusion to improve detection and accurate classification of any liver lesions. Due to the characteristic blood flow pattern of HCC tumors, a specific perfusion pattern of any detected liver lesion may conclusively detect an HCC tumor. Alternatively, the scan may detect an indeterminate lesion and further evaluation may be performed by obtaining a biopsy of the lesion.

=== Imaging ===
Triphasic contrast CT of hepatocellular carcinoma

Ultrasound, CT scan, and MRI may be used to evaluate the liver for HCC. On CT and MRI, HCC can have three distinct patterns of growth:

- A single large tumor
- Multiple tumors
- Poorly defined tumor with an infiltrative growth pattern

A systematic review of CT diagnosis found that the sensitivity was 68% (95% CI 55–80%) and specificity was 93% (95% CI 89–96%) compared with pathologic examination of an explanted or resected liver as the reference standard. With triple-phase helical CT, the sensitivity was 90% or higher, but these data have not been confirmed with autopsy studies. Online open-access datasets of HCC CT examinations are available.

However, MRI has the advantage of delivering high-resolution images of the liver without ionizing radiation. HCC appears as a high-intensity pattern on T2-weighted images and a low-intensity pattern on T1-weighted images. The advantage of MRI is that it has improved sensitivity and specificity when compared to ultrasound and CT in cirrhotic patients with whom it can be difficult to differentiate HCC from regenerative nodules. A systematic review found that the sensitivity was 81% (95% CI 70–91%) and specificity was 85% (95% CI 77–93%) compared with pathologic examination of an explanted or resected liver as the reference standard. The sensitivity is further increased if gadolinium contrast-enhanced and diffusion-weighted imaging are combined.

MRI is more sensitive and specific than CT.

Liver image reporting and data system (LI-RADS) is a classification system for the reporting of liver lesions detected on CT and MRI. Radiologists use this standardized system to report on suspicious lesions and to provide an estimated likelihood of malignancy. Categories range from LI-RADS (LR) 1 to 5, in increasing order of concern for cancer. A biopsy is not needed to confirm the diagnosis of HCC if certain imaging criteria are met.

=== Pathology ===
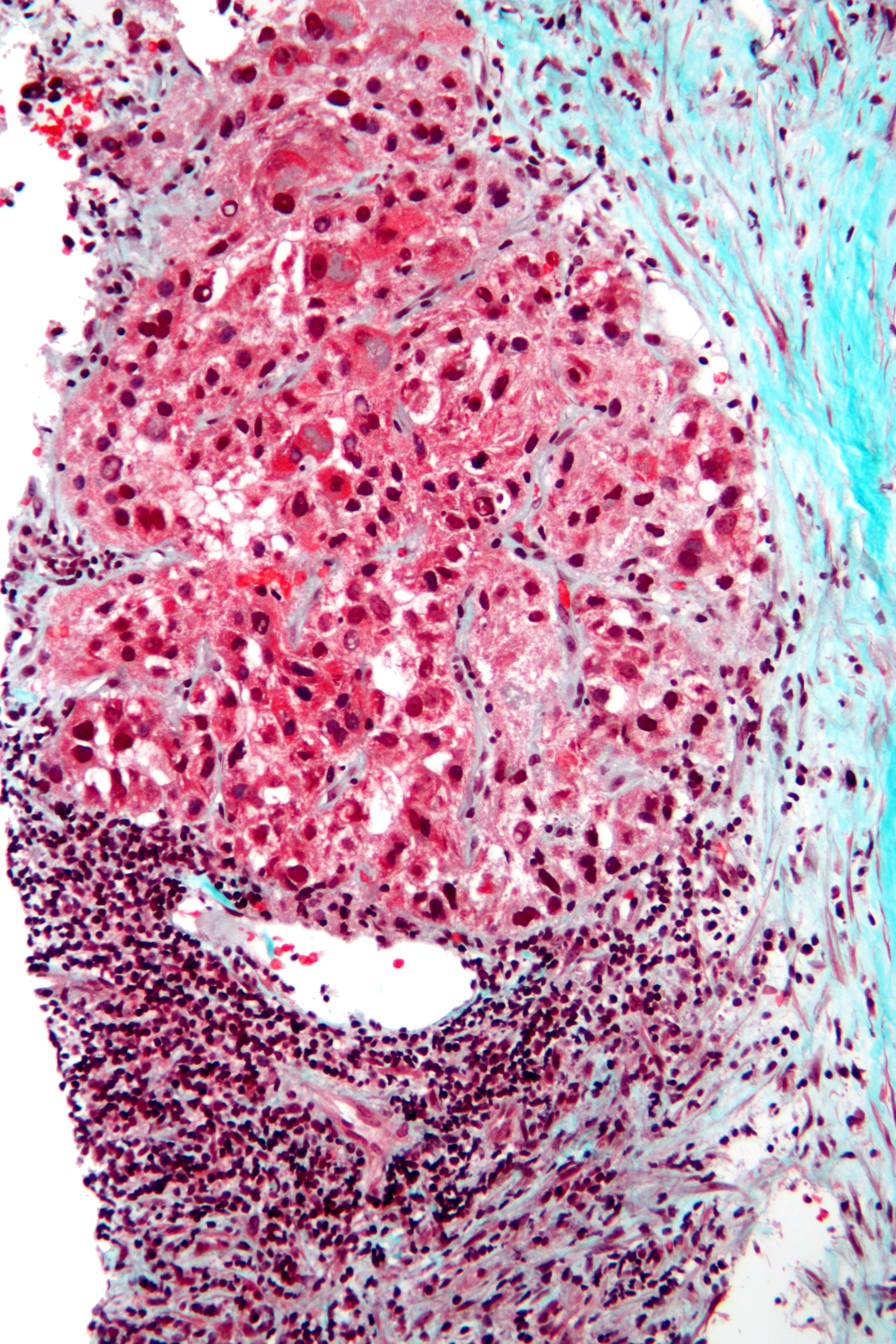
Micrograph of hepatocellular carcinoma. Liver biopsy. Trichrome stain

Macroscopically, liver cancer appears as a nodular or infiltrative tumor. The nodular type may be solitary (large mass) or multiple (when developed as a complication of cirrhosis). Tumor nodules are round to oval, gray or green (if the tumor produces bile), well circumscribed but not encapsulated. The diffuse type is poorly circumscribed and infiltrates the portal veins, or the hepatic veins (rarely).

Microscopically, the four architectural and cytological types (patterns) of hepatocellular carcinoma are: fibrolamellar, pseudoglandular (adenoid), pleomorphic (giant cell), and clear cell. In well-differentiated forms, tumor cells resemble hepatocytes, form trabeculae, cords, and nests, and may contain bile pigment in the cytoplasm. In poorly differentiated forms, malignant epithelial cells are discohesive, pleomorphic, anaplastic, and giant. The tumor has a scant stroma and central necrosis because of the poor vascularization. A fifth form – lymphoepithelioma like hepatocellular carcinoma – has also been described.

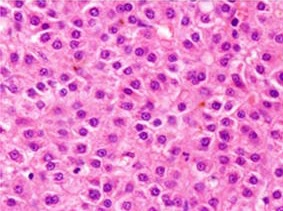
Well-differentiated HCC

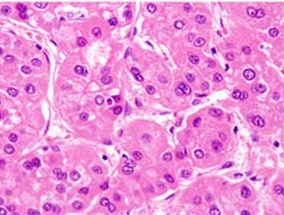
Moderately differentiated HCC

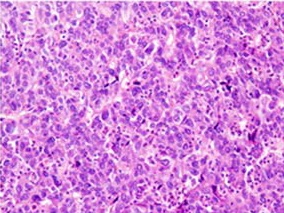
Poorly differentiated HCC

=== Staging ===
Barcelona Clinic Liver Cancer (BCLC) Staging System

The prognosis of HCC is affected by the staging of the tumor, the liver's function due to the effects of chronic liver disease and cirrhosis as well as the person's physical performance status.

A number of staging classifications for HCC are available. However, due to the unique nature of the carcinoma to fully encompass all the features that affect the categorization of the HCC, a classification system should incorporate tumor size and number, presence of vascular invasion and extrahepatic spread, liver function (levels of serum bilirubin and albumin, presence of ascites, and portal hypertension) and general health status of the patient (defined by the ECOG classification) and the presence of symptoms.

Of all the staging classification systems available, the Barcelona Clinic Liver Cancer staging classification encompasses all of the above characteristics. This staging classification can be used to guide treatment decisions.

Barcelona Clinic Liver Cancer classification
Stage	Description	Child-Pugh class	ECOG performance status
0 (very early stage)	Single nodule, < 3 cm	A	0
A (early stage)	1–3 nodule, all < 3 cm	A or B	0
B (intermediate stage)	Multi-nodular tumor	A or B	0
C (advanced stage)	Portal invasion and extra-hepatic spread	A or B	1 or 2
D (terminal stage)	Severe liver damage	C	3 or 4

Important features that guide treatment include:

- size
- spread (stage)
- involvement of liver vessels
- presence of a tumor capsule
- presence of extrahepatic metastases
- presence of daughter nodules
- vascularity of the tumor

The most common sites of metastasis are the lung, abdominal lymph nodes, and bone.

== Prevention ==
Since hepatitis B and C are some of the main causes of hepatocellular carcinoma, prevention of infection is key to then prevent HCC. Thus, childhood vaccination against hepatitis B may reduce the risk of liver cancer in the future. In those with chronic hepatitis C infection, treatment of the hepatitis C using medications reduces the risk of developing HCC.

In the case of patients with cirrhosis, alcohol consumption is to be avoided. Also, screening for hemochromatosis may be beneficial for some patients. HCC surveillance in those with chronic liver disease with cirrhosis is indicated and generally consists of a twice-yearly ultrasound with or without Alpha-fetoprotein lab testing. The utility of HCC surveillance or screening in those with chronic liver disease without cirrhosis is less well established.

== Treatment ==
Treatment of hepatocellular carcinoma varies by the stage of disease, a person's likelihood to tolerate surgery, and availability of liver transplantation:

1. Curative intention: for limited disease, when the cancer is limited to one or more areas of within the liver, surgically removing the malignant cells may be curative. This may be accomplished by resection the affected portion of the liver (partial hepatectomy) or in some cases by orthotopic liver transplantation of the entire organ.
2. "Bridging" intention: for limited disease which qualifies for potential liver transplantation, the person may undergo targeted treatment of some or all of the known tumor while waiting for a donor organ to become available.
3. "Downstaging" intention: for moderately advanced disease which has not spread beyond the liver, but is too advanced to qualify for curative treatment. The person may be treated by targeted therapies in order to reduce the size or number of active tumors, with the goal of once again qualifying for liver transplant after this treatment.
4. Palliative intention: for more advanced disease, including spread of cancer beyond the liver or in persons who may not tolerate surgery, treatment intended to decrease symptoms of disease and maximize duration of survival.

Loco-regional therapy (also referred to as liver-directed therapy) refers to any one of several minimally-invasive treatment techniques to focally target HCC within the liver. These procedures are alternatives to surgery, and may be considered in combination with other strategies, such as a later liver transplantation. Generally, these treatment procedures are performed by interventional radiologists or surgeons, in coordination with a medical oncologist. Loco-regional therapy may refer to either percutaneous therapies (e.g. cryoablation), or arterial catheter-based therapies (chemoembolization or radioembolization).

=== Surgical resection ===
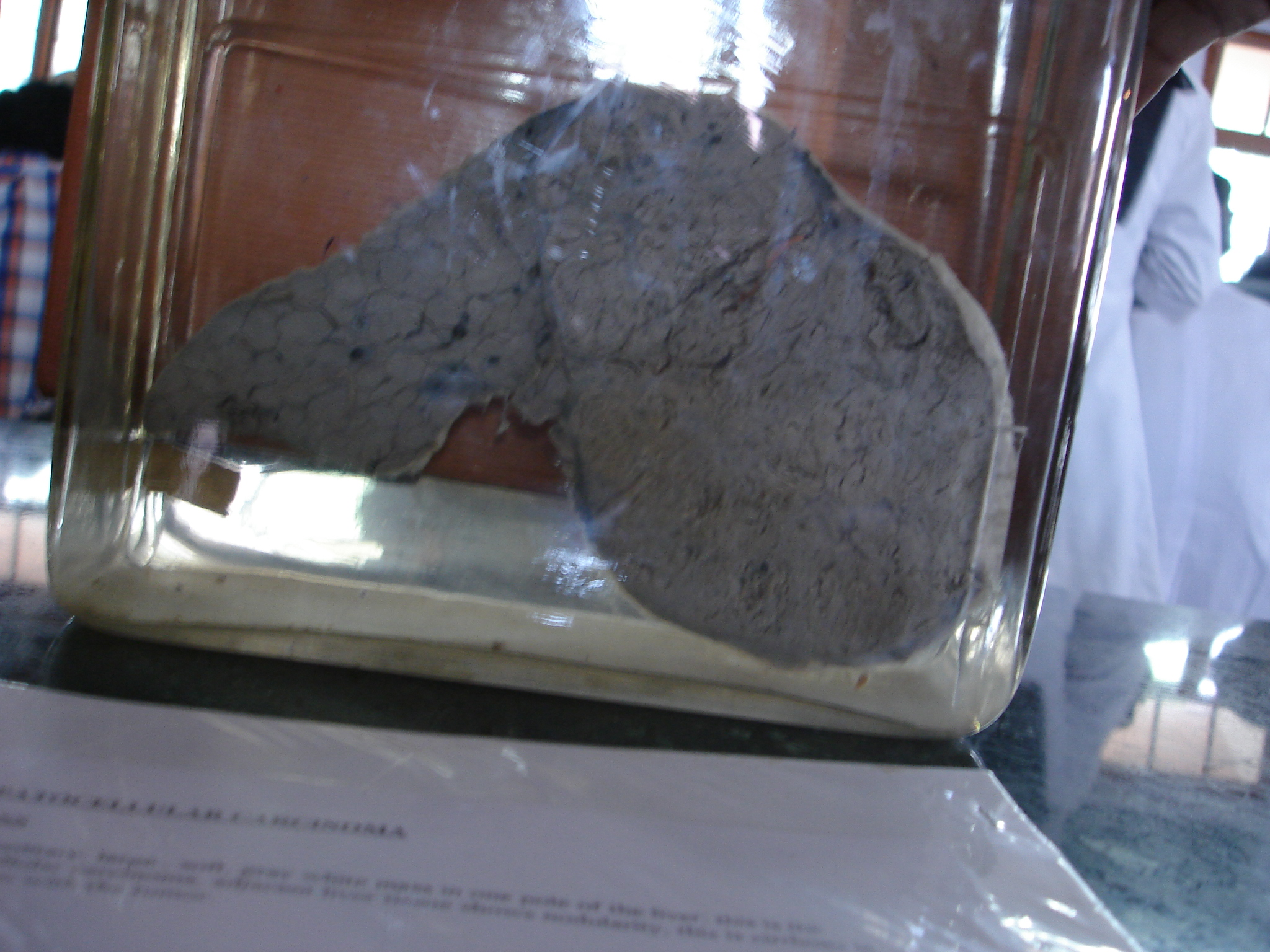
Gross anatomy of hepatocellular carcinoma

Surgical resection of HCC tumors is usually the preferred treatment for BCLC stage 0 or A disease. Surgical resection is associated with a greater than 60% survival rate at 5 years and a recurrence rate greater than 70%. Surgical removal of the tumor is associated with better cancer prognosis, but only 5–15% of patients are suitable for surgical resection due to the extent of disease or poor liver function. Surgery is only considered if the entire tumor can be safely removed while preserving sufficient functional liver to maintain normal physiology. Thus, preoperative imaging assessment is critical to determine both the extent of HCC and to estimate the amount of residual liver remaining after surgery. To maintain liver function, residual liver volume should exceed 25% of total liver volume in a noncirrhotic liver, greater than 40% in a cirrhotic liver. Surgery on diseased or cirrhotic livers is generally associated with higher morbidity and mortality. The Singapore Liver Cancer Recurrence score can be used to estimate risk of recurrence after surgery.

=== Liver transplantation ===
Liver transplantation, replacing the diseased liver with a cadaveric or a living donor liver, plays an increasing role in treatment of HCC. Although outcomes following liver transplant were initially poor (20%–36% survival rate), outcomes have significantly improved with improvement in surgical techniques and adoption of the Milan criteria at transplantation centers. Expanded Shanghai criteria in China have resulted in overall survival and disease-free survival rates similar to those achieved using the Milan criteria. Studies from the late 2000s obtained higher survival rates ranging from 67% to 91%. Other estimates of 5 year survival after liver transplantation range from 60 to 60% with a 50% survival rate at 10 years. The risk of HCC recurrence after liver transplantation is less than 15%. Macrovascular or extrahepatic spread (spread of the cancer to blood vessels or outside the liver, respectively) are contraindications to liver transplantation.

The risks of liver transplantation extend beyond risk of the procedure itself. The immunosuppressive medication required after surgery to prevent rejection of the donor liver also impairs the body's natural ability to combat dysfunctional cells. If the tumor has spread undetected outside the liver before the transplant, the medication effectively increases the rate of disease progression and decreases survival. Liver transplantation can be a curative approach for patients with advanced HCC without extrahepatic metastasis. Among patients with compensated cirrhosis, transplantation is not associated with improved survival compared to hepatectomy, but instead is significantly more expensive.

=== Ablation ===
- Radiofrequency ablation (RFA) uses high-frequency radio waves to destroy tumors by local heating. The electrodes are inserted into the liver tumor under ultrasound guidance using percutaneous, laparoscopic or open surgical approach. It is suitable for small tumors 2 centimeters or less. RFA may be used in those with stage 0 or A disease, especially in those who are not candidates for resection. RFA has the best outcomes in patients with a solitary tumor less than 4 cm. Since it is a local treatment and has minimal effect on normal healthy tissue, it can be repeated multiple times. Survival is better for those with smaller tumors. In one series of 302 patients, the three-year survival rates for lesions >5 cm, 2.1 to 5 cm, and ≤2 cm were 59, 74, and 91%, respectively. A large randomized trial comparing surgical resection and RFA for small HCC showed similar four-year survival and less morbidities for patients treated with RFA. Ablation methods (usually RF ablation) or arterial based treatments may be used on those awaiting liver transplantation to lower tumor burden (Milan score) and improve treatment response. It may also be used to reduce tumor burden making one eligible for liver transplantation.
- Cryoablation is a technique used to destroy the tumor using cold temperatures. The tumor is not removed and the destroyed cancer is left to be reabsorbed by the body. Initial results in properly selected patients with unresectable liver tumors are equivalent to those of resection. Cryosurgery involves the placement of a stainless steel probe into the center of the tumor and freezing the tumor using liquid nitrogen. Frequently, cryosurgery is used in conjunction with liver resection, as some of the tumors are removed while others are treated with cryosurgery.
- Percutaneous ethanol injection is well tolerated in small (<3 cm) solitary tumors. Local therapy can achieve a 5-year survival rate around 60% for patients with small HCC.

=== Arterial catheter-based treatment ===
- Transcatheter arterial chemoembolization (TACE) may be used in BCLC stage B disease and for un-resectable tumors or as a temporary treatment while waiting for liver transplant ("bridge to transplant"). TACE is done by injecting an antineoplastic drug (e.g. cisplatin) mixed with a radio-opaque contrast (e.g. Lipiodol) and an embolic agent (e.g. Gelfoam) into the right or left hepatic artery via the groin artery. The goal of the procedure is to restrict the tumor's vascular supply while supplying a targeted chemotherapeutic agent. TACE has been shown to increase survival and to downstage HCC in patients who exceed the Milan criteria for liver transplant. Patients who undergo the procedure are followed with CT scans and may need additional TACE procedures if the tumor persists. The median survival after TACE is 26–40 months with a tumor response rate of approximately 52%. Combining TACE with systemic therapy (sorafenib or brivanib) does not improve survival. The risk of death after transarterial treatments, including TACE, is about 1%, usually due to liver failure. TACE can be administered in two primary categories, including conventional (cTACE) or by using drug-eluting beads (DEB-TACE) for higher specificity in drug delivery directly to hepatic tumor tissue.
- Selective internal radiation therapy (SIRT) can be used to destroy the tumor using selective injection of the artery or arteries supplying the tumor with a radioisotope agent. The agent is typically Yttrium-90 (Y-90) incorporated into embolic microspheres that lodge in the tumor vasculature, causing ischemia and delivering their radiation dose directly to the lesion with the intention of sparing the surrounding liver. Based on limited evidence, SIRT has similar efficacy to TACE. Two products are available, SIR-Spheres and TheraSphere. The latter is an FDA-approved treatment for primary liver cancer which has been shown in clinical trials to increase the survival rate of low-risk patients. SIR-Spheres are FDA-approved for the treatment of metastatic colorectal cancer, but outside the US, SIR-Spheres are approved for the treatment of any nonresectable liver cancer including primary liver cancer.

=== External beam therapy ===
- The role of radiotherapy in the treatment of hepatocellular carcinoma has evolved as technological advancements in treatment delivery and imaging have provided a means for safe and effective radiotherapy delivery in a wide spectrum of HCC patients. In metastatic cases, radiotherapy can be used for palliative care.
- Proton therapy for unresectable hepatocellular carcinoma was associated with improved survival relative to photon-based radiation therapy which may be driven by decreased incidence of post-treatment liver decompensation.

=== Systemic ===
Systemic therapy for HCC is indicated in BCLC stage C disease, in which cancer has spread beyond the liver. It is also indicated in BCLC stage B disease with tumor progression after local treatments. In 2007, sorafenib, an oral multikinase inhibitor, was the first systemic agent approved for first-line treatment of advanced HCC. Trials have found modest improvement in overall survival: 10.7 months vs 7.9 months and 6.5 months vs 4.2 months.

The most common side effects of Sorafenib include a hand-foot skin reaction and diarrhea. Sorafenib is thought to work by blocking growth of both tumor cells and new blood vessels. Numerous other molecular targeted drugs are being tested as alternative first- and second-line treatments for advanced HCC, such as lenvatinib and regorafenib. Regorafenib increased survival from 7.8 to 10.6 months in those who had tumor progression while on sorafenib compared to placebo.

Cabozantinib, which is an inhibitor of multiple tyrosine kinases including VEGFR, hepatocyte growth factor receptor (MET) and AXL and ramucirumab, an antibody directed against VEGF receptor 2, are second line therapies which have been shown to reduce the risk of death compared to placebo.

A host of additional targeted therapies and immune checkpoint inhibitors have been found to be effective. For instance, in the recent phase III trial IMBrave 150, the combination of atezolizumab and bevacizumab was found to improve both overall and progression-free survival compared to sorafenib alone.

Tremelimumab (Imjudo) was approved for medical use in the United States in October 2022. It is indicated, in combination with durvalumab, for the treatment of adults with unresectable hepatocellular carcinoma.

=== Other ===
- Portal vein embolization (PVE): This technique is sometimes used to increase the volume of healthy liver, in order to improve chances of survival following surgical removal of diseased liver. For example, embolization of the right main portal vein would result in compensatory hypertrophy of the left lobe, which may qualify the patient for a partial hepatectomy. Embolization is performed by an interventional radiologist using a percutaneous transhepatic approach. This procedure can also serve as a bridge to transplant.
- High intensity focused ultrasound (HIFU) (as opposed to diagnostic ultrasound) is an experimental technique which uses high-powered ultrasound waves to destroy tumor tissue.
- A systematic review assessed 12 articles involving a total of 318 patients with hepatocellular carcinoma treated with Yttrium-90 radioembolization. Excluding a study of only one patient, post-treatment CT evaluation of the tumor showed a response ranging from 29 to 100% of patients evaluated, with all but two studies showing a response of 71% or greater.

== Prognosis ==
The prognosis of hepatocellular carcinoma (HCC) varies dramatically depending on disease stage at diagnosis and treatment approach. According to the Barcelona Clinic Liver Cancer (BCLC) strategy, untreated patients have a dismal outcome, with median survival of approximately 3 months for end-stage disease. With appropriate treatment, prognosis improves significantly: patients with very early (BCLC-0) or early-stage disease (BCLC-A) who receive curative treatments like ablation, resection, or liver transplantation can achieve median survival exceeding 5 years. For intermediate-stage disease (BCLC-B), treatment with transarterial chemoembolization (TACE) yields median survival of more than 2.5 years. Advanced-stage patients (BCLC-C) treated with first-line systemic therapies such as atezolizumab-bevacizumab or sorafenib can expect median survival exceeding 2 years, with second-line options like regorafenib, cabozantinib, or ramucirumab (for patients with AFP >400 ng/ml) further extending survival after disease progression. Prognosis is also influenced by liver function status, with the albumin-bilirubin score and AFP levels serving as important prognostic indicators beyond traditional Child-Pugh classification. HCC associated with hepatitis B and/or hepatitis C has significantly higher mortality than other types of HCC.

HCC occurrence results in the loss of a considerable number of years-of-life, especially for younger patients. An HCC diagnosis when a single tumour <2 cm results in 3.7 years-of-life lost while the diagnosis when a single tumour ≥ 2 cm or 2/3 nodules still within the Milan criteria, results in 5.0 years-of-life lost. Since the possibility of effectively treating small HCC tumors has improved in recent years, the patients are living longer, which means fewer years of potential life are being lost.

== Epidemiology ==
Age-standardized death from liver cancer per 100,000 inhabitants in 2004 no data less than 7.5 7.5–15 15–22.5 22.5–30 30–37.5 37.5–45 45–52.5 52.5–60 60–67.5 67.5–75 75–110 more than 110

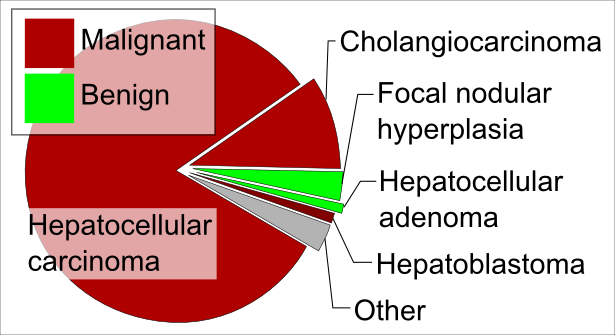
Liver tumor types by relative incidence in adults in the United States, with hepatocellular carcinoma at left.

HCC is one of the most common tumors worldwide. The epidemiology of HCC exhibits two main patterns, one in North America and Western Europe and another in non-Western countries, such as those in sub-Saharan Africa, Central and Southeast Asia, and the Amazon basin. Males are affected more than females usually, and it is most common between the ages of 30 and 50, Hepatocellular carcinoma causes 662,000 deaths worldwide per year about half of them in China.

=== Africa and Asia ===
In some parts of the world, such as sub-Saharan Africa and Southeast Asia, HCC is the most common cancer, generally affecting men more than women, and with an age of onset between the late teens and 30s. This variability is in part due to the different patterns of hepatitis B and hepatitis C transmission in different populations – infection at or around birth predispose to earlier cancers than if people are infected later. The time between hepatitis B infection and development into HCC can be years, even decades, but from diagnosis of HCC to death, the average survival period is only 5.9 months according to one Chinese study during the 1970–80s, or 3 months (median survival time) in sub-Saharan Africa according to Manson's textbook of tropical diseases. HCC is one of the deadliest cancers in China, where chronic hepatitis B is found in 90% of cases. In Japan, chronic hepatitis C is associated with 90% of HCC cases. Foods infected with Aspergillus flavus (especially peanuts and corns stored during prolonged wet seasons) which produces aflatoxins pose another risk factor for HCC.

=== North America and Western Europe ===
The most common malignant tumors in the liver represent metastases (spread) from tumors which originate elsewhere in the body. Among cancers that originate from liver tissue, HCC is the most common primary liver cancer. In the United States, the US surveillance, epidemiology, and end results database program, shows that HCC accounts for 65% of all cases of liver cancers. As screening programs are in place for high-risk persons with chronic liver disease, HCC is often discovered much earlier in Western countries than in developing regions such as sub-Saharan Africa.

Acute and chronic hepatic porphyrias (acute intermittent porphyria, porphyria cutanea tarda, hereditary coproporphyria, variegate porphyria) and tyrosinemia type I are risk factors for hepatocellular carcinoma. The diagnosis of an acute hepatic porphyria (AIP, HCP, VP) should be sought in patients with HCC without typical risk factors of hepatitis B or C, alcoholic liver cirrhosis, or hemochromatosis. Both active and latent genetic carriers of acute hepatic porphyrias are at risk for this cancer, although latent genetic carriers have developed the cancer at a later age than those with classic symptoms. Patients with acute hepatic porphyrias should be monitored for HCC.

The incidence of HCC is relatively lower in the Western Hemisphere than in Eastern Asia. However, despite the statistics being low, the diagnosis of HCC has increased since the 1980s and it is continuing to increase, making it one of the rising causes of death due to cancer. The common risk factor for HCC is hepatitis C, along with other health issues.

== Research ==
=== Preclinical ===
Mipsagargin (G-202), has orphan drug designation as a treatment during chemotherapy for HCC. It is a thapsigargin-based prodrug with cytotoxic activity used to reduce blood flow to the tumor during treatment. Results from Phase 2 trial recommended G-202 as a first-in-class PSMA-targeted prodrug and that it move to clinical trials.

Current research includes the search for the genes that are dysregulated in HCC, antiheparanase antibodies, protein markers, non-coding RNAs (such as TUC338) and other predictive biomarkers. As similar research is yielding results in various other malignant diseases, it is hoped that identifying the aberrant genes and the resultant proteins could lead to the identification of pharmacological interventions for HCC.

The development of three-dimensional culture methods provides a new approach for preclinical studies of cancer therapy using patient-derived organoids. These miniaturized organoid 'avatars' of a patient's tumor recapitulate several features of the original tumor, rendering them an attractive model for drug-sensitivity testing and precision medicine for HCC and other types of primary liver cancer.

Furthermore, HCC occurs in patients with liver disease. A biomarker named six-miRNA signature allows effective treatment of patients with HCC and is able to predict its recurrence in the liver.

A prospective study found that increased hepatocellular cancer risk is associated with higher levels of major circulating bile acids that were measured in people several years prior to tumor diagnosis. In another study using a mouse model, it was found that dysregulated hepatic bile acids collaboratively promote liver carcinogenesis. Evidence was reviewed that alterations in bile acids by the human gut microbiome can contribute to hepatocarcinogenesis. The gut microbiota that contribute to hepatocellular carcinoma appear to be distinct from those causing colorectal cancer.

=== Clinical ===
JX-594, an oncolytic virus, has orphan drug designation for this condition and is undergoing clinical trials. Hepcortespenlisimut-L (Hepko-V5), an oral cancer vaccine, also has US FDA orphan drug designation for HCC. Immunitor Inc. completed a Phase II trial, published in 2017. A randomized trial of people with advanced HCC showed no benefit for the combination of everolimus and pasireotide.

== See also ==
- Hemihypertrophy
- Oncovirus
- Portal hypertension
