= Bland embolization =

Medical procedure involving liver

- Other names: Hepatic arterial embolization
- Specialty: Interventional radiology

Transarterial bland embolization (TAE, also known as HAE) is a catheter-based tumor treatment of the liver. In this procedure, embolizing agents (e.g., polyvinyl alcohol, gelfoam, acrylic copolymer gelatin particles, embospheres) can be delivered through the tumor's feeding artery in order to completely occlude the tumor's blood supply. The anti-tumor effects are solely based on tumor ischemia and infarction of tumor tissue, as no chemotherapeutic agents are administered. The rationale for the use of bland embolization for hepatocellular carcinoma (HCC) and/or other hyper-vascular tumors is based on the fact that a normal liver receives a dual blood supply from the hepatic artery (25%) and the portal vein (75%). As the tumor grows, it becomes increasingly dependent on the hepatic artery for blood supply. Once a tumor nodule reaches a diameter of 2 cm or more, most of the blood supply is derived from the hepatic artery. Therefore, bland embolization and transarterial chemoembolization (TACE) consist of the selective angiographic occlusion of the tumor arterial blood supply with a variety of embolizing agents, with or without the precedence of local chemotherapy infusion. The occlusion by embolic particles results in tumor hypoxia and necrosis, without affecting the normal hepatic parenchyma.

== History ==
Although TACE is considered the gold standard and TAE has largely been abandoned as a primary hepatic intra-arterial therapy for primary liver cancer, there are a few studies that suggest sufficient anti-tumor effects of TAE. In a series of 322 patients undergoing bland embolization for HCC with a median follow-up of 20 months, 1-, 2-, and 3- year overall survival rates were 66%, 46% and 33% respectively. When patients with extra-hepatic disease or portal vein involvement were excluded, overall 1-, 2- and 3-year survival rates rose to 84%, 66% and 51%, and median survival 40 months, respectively. A meta-analysis was performed of randomized controlled trials comparing the survival rates after TACE or TAE, which failed to demonstrate any significant difference between bland or chemoembolization. A later prospective randomized trial compared the response between patients who underwent DEB-TACE and patients who underwent TAE; this study demonstrated a better local tumor response with DEB-TACE versus TAE. A single blinded control trial compared the outcomes of TAE and DEB-TACE in a total of 101 patients with unresectable Okuda stage I or II HCC. Tumor response rate was the primary endpoint using Response Evaluation Criteria In Solid Tumors (RECIST) criteria, while time to progression (TTP), progression free survival (PFS) and overall survival (OS) were defined as the secondary endpoints. In this study, no significant difference between the groups was noted and both groups showed comparable tumor response, PFS and TTP.

According to American Association for the Study of Liver Diseases guidelines, there is no differences between TAE and TACE. However, European Association for the Study of the Liver guidelines discouraged the use of TAE.

== Medical uses ==
The most common indication of this therapy is for treatment of unresectable primary hepatocellular carcinoma, based on anatomic distribution of disease, vascular invasion, underlying hepatic function or a combination of these factors.

The majority of patients with HCC have underlying liver disease with resultant cirrhosis. Patients with normal liver function and, presumably, normal hepatic parenchyma may undergo resection of 75% to 80% of their liver without developing postoperative hepatic failure. Patients with underlying liver disease require a greater volume of liver remnant to maintain hepatic function, thus, tumors that might normally be resectable in patients with normal liver parenchyma may not be resectable in the presence of cirrhosis. The Child-Pugh nominal liver staging system is the most accurate in predicting survival of patients with unresectable HCC treated with TACE and TAE. Patients with Child-Pugh class C cirrhosis may be more likely to die of their underlying liver disease than of their HCC and are unlikely to tolerate arterial embolization well and therefore, embolization therapy is only indicated in patients with Child A or B cirrhosis.

When evaluating a patient for embolization, both the severity of the underlying liver disease and the extent of the tumor being treated may be considered. In 1999, Llovet et al. proposed the Barcelona Clinic Liver Cancer (BCLC) staging classification as a means of both classifying patients and linking their stage to a specific treatment. Although selective embolization of a solitary well circumscribed HCC in a patient with Child Class B cirrhosis might be well tolerated, embolization of a hemi-liver in a Child A patient with multifocal hepatoma involving more than 75% of the liver and with portal vein tumor thrombus may result in hepatic failure and death.

Patients with hepatic metastatic disease from neuroendocrine tumors, gastrointestinal stromal tumors and other sarcomas, ocular melanoma, and some "hypervascular" metastases (such as those from breast cancer or renal cell cancer) may also be candidates for bland embolization, assuming the liver is the only site of disease, or when the procedure is being performed for palliation of symptoms. Since the purpose of hepatic embolization in these cases is to either treat symptoms or extend survival, patient who are asymptomatic from their secondary hepatic disease and who have disease elsewhere are not recommended to be considered as candidates. Intra-arterial therapy based on ischemia induced by terminal vessel blockage should not be expected to be efficacious in patients with hypovascular tumors and has no proven role in the treatment of typical metastatic adenocarcinoma from most gastrointestinal malignancies.

== Procedure ==
As part of the pre-procedure work-up, every patient has a triple-phase CT scan within a month of the scheduled embolization. Triple-phase CT is essential for documenting the extent of disease, demonstrating arterial anatomy, evaluating the portal venous system, and looking for non-hepatic blood supply to the tumor. This study serves as the basis for a treatment plan. The extent and distribution of the tumors are laid out, arterial blood supply to the tumor is evident and any contribution from the extra hepatic vasculature such as the phrenic or internal mammary arteries, should be seen.

Celiac and mesenteric angiography is performed to document arterial anatomy, demonstrate the hypervascular tumor and evaluate the direction of blood flow, which cannot be determined by conventional triple-phase CT. At the same time, selective angiography should be undertaken by injecting vessels known to supply the tumor by previous triple-phase CT.

If multifocal bilobar disease is present, one side of the liver is selected for treatment at the first sitting, usually the side with the largest tumor burden. The catheter is placed selectively into the right or left hepatic artery and arteriography is performed. The target vessel is subsequently embolized with embospheres suspended in contrast material until stasis is evident. Stasis is defined as lack of antegrade flow, with evidence of reflux on injection of even small amounts of contrast material. When stasis occurs, the procedure is terminated and a final arteriogram is performed to document occlusion of the target vessel and preservation of the blood flow to non-target vessels.

For solitary tumors, an attempt is made to embolize the tumor as selectively as possible. The initial arteriogram is reviewed to determine which vessel or vessels are feeding the tumor. Each vessel is then selected, typically with a coaxial 2F or 3F catheter, and that vessel is embolized with up to 10 mL of the smallest-size particles. if antegrade flow persists after 10 mL of the smallest particle have been used, treatment is continued with the next size particle, and so on until stasis occurs and persists. If additional vessels are identified supplying the tumor, these vessels are sequentially catheterized and treated beginning with the smallest particle and continuing until stasis is evident.

When embolization of the target vessel or vessels is complete, a final angiogram is performed to document the result. When appropriate, angiography of non-hepatic vessels potentially supplying the tumor (e.g. phrenic, internal mammary or intercostal arteries) is performed. If the patient is doing well, use of contrast material has not been excessive and embolization of additional vessels is thought to be safe, the procedure continues. Once the entire tumor or hemiliver has been treated, the procedure is terminated and an immediate CT scan is then performed. This scan will demonstrate uptake of contrast in the treated tumor with circumferential coverage, assuming appropriate vessels have been targeted. The treatment plan for the next embolization is outlined.

== Platforms ==
Until the late 1990s, 50-μm polyvinyl alcohol (PVA) particles (Cook Medical, Bloomington, Ind.) were the smallest particles available Embospheres (Biosphere Medical, Rockland Mass.), a hydrophilic trisacryl gelatin microsphere, later became available in 100- to 300- μm sizes. Despite the larger sphere size, the fact that the microspheres were spherical and hydrophilic meant they did not "clump" like PVA and were capable of penetrating more distally into the terminal vasculature. Eventually 40- to 120- μm Embospheres became available and gradually started to be used exclusively.

== Complications ==
Similar to transarterial chemoembolization (TACE), postembolization syndrome is one of the most common side effects of bland embolization. It consists of pain, fever, nausea, and vomiting. PES should be considered a side effect and not a complication of embolotherapy. It can be thought of as a type of tumor lysis syndrome. After abrupt ischemic tumor cell death, the tumor cells lyse and release their intracellular material into the bloodstream. PES is treated with analgesics, antipyretics, and antiemetics and typically subsides after 24–72 hours.

Liver abscess is a rare complication of hepatic embolization, so the typical post-embolization appearance of a low density lesson with scattered gas bubbles should not be confused with liver abscess. It is seen most commonly in patient who have undergone bilioenteric bypass or who for any reason do not have an intact sphincter of Oddi. In a review of almost 1000 patients undergoing over 2000 embolization procedures, the risk of liver abscess in patients with a contaminated biliary tree was found to be 300 times higher than the baseline risk.

Non-target embolization is one of the most dreaded complications of hepatic embolotherapy but occurs infrequently when strict attention is paid to arterial anatomy. The gallbladder is commonly the most commonly involved non-target organ. Inadvertent gallbladder embolization results in prolonged PES with fever, pain, and nausea and vomiting.

After embolization, patients are observed in the post-anesthesia care unit for several hours. Patients are discharged from the hospital when taking adequate nutrition by mouth, when pain is adequately controlled with oral narcotics and when the temperature is lower than 38.5 for 24 hours.

== Post-procedure evaluation ==
Follow-up triple phase CT is performed 2 to 4 weeks after treatment is complete and reviewed for any evidence of persistent untreated disease. If there is no evidence of enhancement of the treated tumor, patients are monitored with triple phase CT every 3 months for the first year and every 6 months thereafter. When there is evidence of untreated disease, recurrent disease, or new disease elsewhere within the liver, the patient is scheduled for additional embolization.

== See also ==
- Transcatheter arterial chemoembolization
