= Transcatheter arterial chemoembolization =

- Other names: Transarterial chemoembolization; TACE
- Specialty: Interventional radiology
- Uses: Treatment of tumors (especially non-resectable hepatocellular carcinoma)
- Types: Conventional TACE (cTACE) and drug-eluting beads TACE (DEB-TACE)

Transcatheter arterial chemoembolization (TACE) is a minimally invasive procedure performed in interventional radiology to restrict a tumor's blood supply. Small embolic particles coated with chemotherapeutic drugs are injected selectively through a catheter into an artery directly supplying the tumor. These particles both block the blood supply and induce cytotoxicity, attacking the tumor in several ways.

The radiotherapeutic analogue (combining radiotherapy with embolization) is called radioembolization or selective internal radiation therapy (SIRT).

Clinical trials determine what type of therapy is generally most successful for treating any particular type of tumor. Panels of physicians, such as the National Comprehensive Cancer Network, determine what therapies to recommend for a given tumor type based on the outcomes of these trials. Although in theory TACE can be applied to any tumor, currently TACE is used primarily for tumors of the liver.

== Principles ==
TACE of liver tumors derives its beneficial effect by two primary mechanisms. Most tumors within the liver are supplied by the proper hepatic artery, so arterial embolization preferentially interrupts the tumor's blood supply and stalls growth until neovascularization. Secondly, focused administration of chemotherapy allows for delivery of a higher dose to the tissue while simultaneously reducing systemic exposure, which is typically the dose-limiting factor. This effect is potentiated by the fact that the chemotherapeutic drug is not washed out from the tumor vascular bed by blood flow after embolization. Effectively, this results in a higher concentration of drug to be in contact with the tumor for a longer period of time.

Park et al. conceptualized carcinogenesis of hepatocellular carcinoma (HCC) as a multistep process involving parenchymal arterialization, sinusoidal capillarization, and development of unpaired arteries (a vital component of tumor angiogenesis). All these events lead to a gradual shift in tumor blood supply from portal to arterial circulation. This concept has been validated using dynamic imaging modalities by various investigators. Sigurdson et al. demonstrated that, when an agent was infused via the hepatic artery, intratumoral concentrations were ten times greater compared to when agents were administered through the portal vein. Hence, arterial treatment targets the tumor while normal liver is relatively spared. Embolization induces ischemic necrosis of tumor causing a failure of the transmembrane pump, resulting in a greater absorption of cytotoxic agents by the tumor cells. Tissue concentration of agents within the tumor is greater than 40 times that of the surrounding normal liver.

== Therapeutic applications ==
Transcatheter arterial chemoembolization has most widely been applied to hepatocellular carcinoma for patients who are not eligible for surgery. TACE has been shown to increase survival in patients with intermediate HCC by BCLC criteria. It has also been used as an alternative to surgery for resectable early stage HCC and in patients with regional recurrence of the tumor after previous resection. TACE may also be used to downstage HCC in patients who exceed the Milan criteria for liver transplantation.

Other treated malignancies include neuroendocrine tumors, ocular melanoma, cholangiocarcinoma, and sarcoma. Transcatheter arterial chemoembolization plays a palliative role in patients with metastatic colon carcinoma. There is a possible benefit for liver-dominant metastases from other primary malignancies.

== Procedure ==
TACE is an interventional radiology procedure performed in the angiography suite. The procedure involves gaining percutaneous transarterial access by the Seldinger technique to the hepatic artery with an arterial sheath, usually by puncturing the common femoral artery in the right groin and passing a catheter guided by a wire through the abdominal aorta, through the celiac trunk and common hepatic artery, and finally into the branch of the proper hepatic artery supplying the tumor.

The interventional radiologist then performs a selective angiogram of the celiac trunk and possibly the superior mesenteric artery to identify the branches of the hepatic artery supplying the tumor(s) and threads smaller, more selective catheters into these branches. This is done to maximize the amount of the chemotherapeutic dose that is directed to the tumor and minimize the amount of the chemotherapeutic agent that could damage the normal liver tissue.

When a blood vessel supplying the tumor has been selected, alternating doses of the chemotherapy dose and of embolic particles, or an infusion of embolic particles containing the chemotherapy agent, are injected through the catheter .

The physician removes the catheter and access sheath, applying pressure to the entry site to prevent bleeding. The patient must lie stationary for several hours after the procedure to allow the punctured artery to heal. The clinician can apply pressure using a Femostop or close the artery using a vascular sealing device. The patient will often be kept overnight for observation and will likely be discharged the following day. The procedure is normally followed up with a CT scan several weeks later to check the response of the tumor to the procedure.

== Agents ==
TACE may be either conventional TACE (cTACE) or TACE with drug-eluting beads (DEBs) (DEB-TACE).

cTACE involves intra-arterial injection of cytotoxic chemotherapy drugs emulsified in Lipiodol, an oily radio-opaque agent. Following this, an embolic agent, for instance gelatin sponge, polyvinyl alcohol particles, or microspheres, is intra-arterially injected.

DEB-TACE involves intra-arterial injection of DEBs, which are non-resorbable embolic microspheres that are loaded with chemotherapy drugs. DEBs allow for more sustained local chemotherapy drug release (e.g., 1 month) along with concomitant embolization. They are alternatively known as drug-eluting embolic (DEE) microspheres.

Examples of specific types of DEBs include the following:

- Polyvinyl alcohol microspheres – loaded with doxorubicin
- Superabsorbent polymer microspheres – loaded with doxorubicin
- Gelatin microspheres – loaded with cisplatin

EmboCept S is an embolic agent made up of degradable starch microspheres (DSM). It can be mixed with low-volume chemotherapeutic agents such as doxorubicin and mitomycin and high-volume chemotherapeutic agents such as cisplatin and irinotecan to be administered into a subject. It is a short-acting, thus will be degraded 2 hours after procedure, limiting the risk of ischemia to other healthy liver cells.

The most commonly used chemotherapy agents in TACE for HCC are (in decreasing order of frequency): doxorubicin, cisplatin, epirubicin, mitoxantrone, and mitomycin C. Less frequently used drugs include anthracyclines, like pirarubicin, nemorubicin, and idarubicin, and platinum-based agents, like miriplatin, carboplatin, and lobaplatin. No evidence-based guidelines exist to guide choice of chemotherapy agents or their dosages and none of the preceding drugs are explicitly approved by regulatory authorities for loco-regional treatment of HCC. The choices of agents, doses, and procedures vary widely between centers and surgeons. There are few studies defining dose-limiting toxicity of these agents, which may explain the widely varying practices. Single-agent therapy (e.g., doxorubicin alone) is appropriate in most cases, but some centers use two- or three-drug combinations (e.g., doxorubicin plus mitomycin C, or doxurubicin plus mitomycin C plus gemcitabine).

TACE may be used in conjunction with systemic chemotherapy agents.

== Other types of cancer besides liver cancer ==
TACE has also been used to treat people with:

- Lung primary cancer or metastases.
- Head and neck cancer.

== Adverse effects ==
As with any interventional procedure, there is a small risk of hemorrhage and/or damage to blood vessels. Pseudoaneurysm can develop at the site of puncture in the femoral artery. During this procedure contrast media is utilized, to which patients may develop an allergic reaction. Symptomatic hypothyroidism may result from the high retained iodine load of the contrast.

Off-target delivery of embolic agents, such as reflux into adjacent healthy tissue, is a recognized complication that may lead to adverse events including gastrointestinal ulceration or cholecystitis. These effects may present with symptoms such as diarrhea, nausea, and abdominal pain, which have been reported as common gastrointestinal adverse events following TACE in meta-analyses. The incidence of these events varies according to the chemotherapeutic agent and TACE technique used. The use of specialized delivery techniques and devices may reduce the overall risk.

TACE induces tumor necrosis in more than 50% of patients; the resulting necrosis releases cytokines and other inflammatory mediators into the bloodstream. A self-limiting postembolization syndrome of pain, fever, and malaise may occur due to hepatocyte and tumor necrosis. Transaminases may elevate 100-fold, and a leukemoid reaction is not uncommon.

Intrahepatic abscess (treated by percutaneous drainage) and gallbladder ischemia are extremely rare. Rising bilirubin is a warning sign of irreversible hepatic necrosis, generally occurring in the setting of cirrhosis. In an effort to reduce the likelihood of significant hepatic toxicity, chemoembolization should be restricted to a single lobe or major branch of the hepatic artery at one time. The patient may be brought back after 1 month, once toxicities and abnormal chemistries have resolved, to complete the procedure in the opposite lobe. Retreatment of new lesions may be necessary, if patients fulfill the original eligibility criteria.

== History ==
In 1972, surgical ligation of the hepatic artery was first used to treat recurrent hepatic tumors followed by infusion of 5-fluorouracil into the portal vein. Due to the liver's dual blood supply from the hepatic artery and portal vein, interruption of the flow through the hepatic artery was demonstrated to be safe in patients. Tumor embolization eventually developed, blocking the vascular supply to a tumor by primarily endovascular approaches. The application of angiography with embolization followed, and the administration of chemotherapeutic agents with embolic particles evolved into transcatheter arterial chemoembolization.

== See also ==
- Bland embolization
