= Fat over lean =

Style of oil painting

Fat over lean refers to the principle in oil painting of applying paint with a higher oil to pigment ratio ('fat') over paint with a lower oil to pigment ratio ('lean') to ensure a stable paint film, since it is believed that the paint with the higher oil content remains more flexible.

Oil paint dries at different rates due to the differing drying properties of the constituent pigment. However, everything else being equal, the higher the oil to pigment ratio, the longer the oil binder will take to oxidize, and the more flexible the paint film will be. Conversely, the lower the oil content, the faster the paint dries, and the more brittle it will be. Ignoring this practice, even in some alla prima painting, may result in a cracked and less durable paint film.

It has been claimed by some paint manufacturers that the 'fat-over-lean' principle can be circumvented by using synthetic, alkyd-based painting media such as Galkyd and Liquin. These media do provide consistent drying times, increase the paint film flexibility, and promote adhesion between paint layers. However, because classical painting media, turpentine, natural resins, and certain plant oils (linseed, walnut and poppy) have lasted for centuries when applied properly, some artists choose to avoid synthetic media since their long-term stability is unknown.
