= Iodized oil =

Medication derived from poppyseed oil and iodine often used as a contrast agent

Clinical data
- Trade names: Lipiodol, Ethiodol, Vividol
- Other names: ethiodized oil, ethyl esters of iodised fatty acids
- AHFS/Drugs.com: International Drug Names
- License data: US DailyMed: Ethiodized_oil
- Routes of administration: by mouth, injection (IM, intralymphatic, intrauterine, selective hepatic intra-arterial)
- ATC code: V08AD01 (WHO): radiocontrast H03CA (WHO): goiter treatment

Identifiers
- CAS Number: 8008-53-5
- ChemSpider: none
- UNII: KZW0R0686Q
- ChEMBL: ChEMBL1201458
- ECHA InfoCard: 100.122.502

Iodized oil, also known as ethiodized oil, brand name Lipiodol, is a medication derived from poppyseed oil and iodine. When given by injection, it is a radio-opaque contrast agent that is used to outline structures in radiological investigations. When given orally or by intramuscular injection once or twice a year, it prevents endemic goitre in remote communities. It has an additional use in gastric variceal obliteration as a dilutant that does not affect polymerization of cyanoacrylate.

When used as tissue contrast, iodized oil has a risk of entering the vein and causing embolism in the brain and lungs. There is a boxed warning referring to the risk of embolism. Use as iodine supplementation is recommended in regions where deficiency is common, otherwise it is not recommended. It should not be used for hysterosalpingography in pregnancy.

Iodized oil was first made in 1901 by Marcel Guerbet and Laurent Lafay. Originally used to treat iodine deficiency, it was identified as an effective radiocontrast in 1921 by Sicard and Forestier, before returning as a tool to treat iodine deficiency in goiter eradication campaigns of the 1980s. Under the name "iodine", iodized oil is on the World Health Organization's List of Essential Medicines, in liquid and capsule form.

== Medical uses ==
=== Imaging ===
Iodized oil is a radio-opaque contrast agent. It is used in chemoembolization applications as a contrast agent in follow-up imaging. Lipiodol is also used in lymphangiography, the imaging of the lymphatic system.

Historically Lipiodol was often used as a contrast medium at hysterosalpingography (HSG: a procedure to determine tubal patency [i.e. whether the fallopian tubes are open], used in the investigation of subfertility). It became less commonly utilized in the 1960s to 1980s because the more modern water-soluble media give images that are easier to interpret. There is also an important safety issue with Lipiodol in that intravasation (leakage) of the fluid into the venous system has caused complications in the past.

=== Chemoembolization ===
Lipiodol is used in conventional transcatheter arterial chemoembolization (TACE), a procedure for treating liver tumors. An anticancer drug is first emulsified into lipiodol to form a suspension. Guided by an imaging system, a catheter is moved into an artery that feeds the tumor and injects the suspension. Lipiodol helps retain the drug around the cancer cells. An embolic material is then injected to restrict blood supply to the tumor.

"Transarterial radioembolization" (TARE) is a similar procedure where the anticancer drug is radioactive. An experimental version of TARE uses iodine-131-labeled lipiodol. The radioactive lipiodol is attracted to the tumor, much like regular lipiodol. Its radioactivity destroys tumor tissue. However, I^{131}-lipiodol has been withdrawn from the market by its European manufacturer due to risk of embolism, especially in patients with hepatic arterio-venous shunting. I^{131}-lipidol is also less tumor-targeted than the microbeads used in conventional TARE procedures, requiring much higher radiation doses. It remains available in India, where its cost-effectiveness over conventional Y^{90} TARE is valued.

=== Gastric variceal obliteration ===
It has an additional use in gastric variceal obliteration as a dilutant that does not affect polymerization of cyanoacrylate.

=== Fallopian tube flushing ===
Since the 2000s, a small number of studies have suggested that flushing lipiodol through the fallopian tubes (similar to what is done in HSG, but without imaging) might provide a short-term rise in fecundity in patients with unexplained infertility. This procedure is called Lipiodol flushing or more broadly tubal flushing. A 2005 systematic review has suggested a significant increase in fertility, especially in those women who have endometriosis when using Lipiodol flushing. A 2020 Cochrane review suggests that flushing with oil-soluble contrast media such as lipiodol may increase the chance of live birth and clinical pregnancy.

=== Iodine deficiency ===
Lipiodol is given once or twice yearly to remote communities at risk of endemic goitre. The oil can be taken orally or injected intermuscularly. There is also an oral capsule that contains the oil, equivalent to 190 mg iodine.

Iodized poppyseed oil (Lipiodol) given orally or intermuscularly produces a long-lasting store of iodine in the body, allowing very infrequent dosing. Iodized oil is a cost-effective way of combating iodine deficiency. There seems to be a lower risk of initial hyperthyroidism compared to iodized salt. Beyond poppyseed oil, locally available rapeseed (Brassiodol), peanut, walnut, and soybean oils have also been used for producing iodized oil for oral use. These iodized oils have different pharmacological profiles, but have also proven successful in eradicating goiter at a lower cost. In fact, iodized rapeseed and peanut oils provide longer-lasting protection from goiter compared to Lipiodol.

== Chemistry ==
Ethiodized oil is composed of iodine reacted with ethyl esters of fatty acids of poppyseed oil, primarily as ethyl monoiodostearate and ethyl diiodostearate. One method to produce the oil involves turning iodine into anhydrous hydroiodic acid using silylated reagents, then reacting the acid with fatty acid ethyl esters. Sufficient amounts of the acid is used to ensure that all double bonds are iodinated. The product is washed and purified to remove any free elemental iodine and other organic compounds, leaving only the iodinated esters.

== History ==
Lipiodol was first synthesized by Marcel Guerbet in the Paris School of Pharmacy in 1901. It was originally used to treat iodine deficiency.

Historically, Lipiodol was the first iodinated contrast agent (used for myelography by two French physicians, Jacques Forestier and Jean Sicard in 1921). It was first used for lymphography in 1960 as a replacement for the earlier water-soluble contrasts, which quickly diffused outside the lymphatic network and prevented visualization beyond the first few nodes. A transesterified version, Lipiodol Ultra Fluide, was proposed by Wallace specifically for this purpose in 1960. In 1981, Japanese professor Konno found that when Lipidol is injected into the hepatic artery of patients with hepatocarcinoma, the oily substance is selectively retained by the tumor for several months. He mixed Lipidol with a new drug SMANCS to selectively target cancer cells; thus, chemoembolization was born.

The use of Lipiodol against iodine deficiency was revived in 1957 by Mac Cullagh, who used it in Papua New Guinea to fight endemic goitre via intramuscular injection. The technique received increasing approval and refinement as a supplement to salt iodization from the Pan American Health Organisation, UNICEF, and WHO. In 1989, it was added to the WHO Model List of Essential Medications.

=== Supply status ===
Savage Laboratories supplied thiodized oil for interventional procedure under the brand name "Ethiodol" to the US market until 2011, when the product was discontinued. The Ethiodol product is equivalent to Lipiodol Ultra Fluide.

Ethiodized oil for interventional procedure was solely produced and marketed by Guerbet, until Vivere Imaging launched its oil under the brand name "Vividol" in 2022.
