= Miriplatin =

Chemical compound

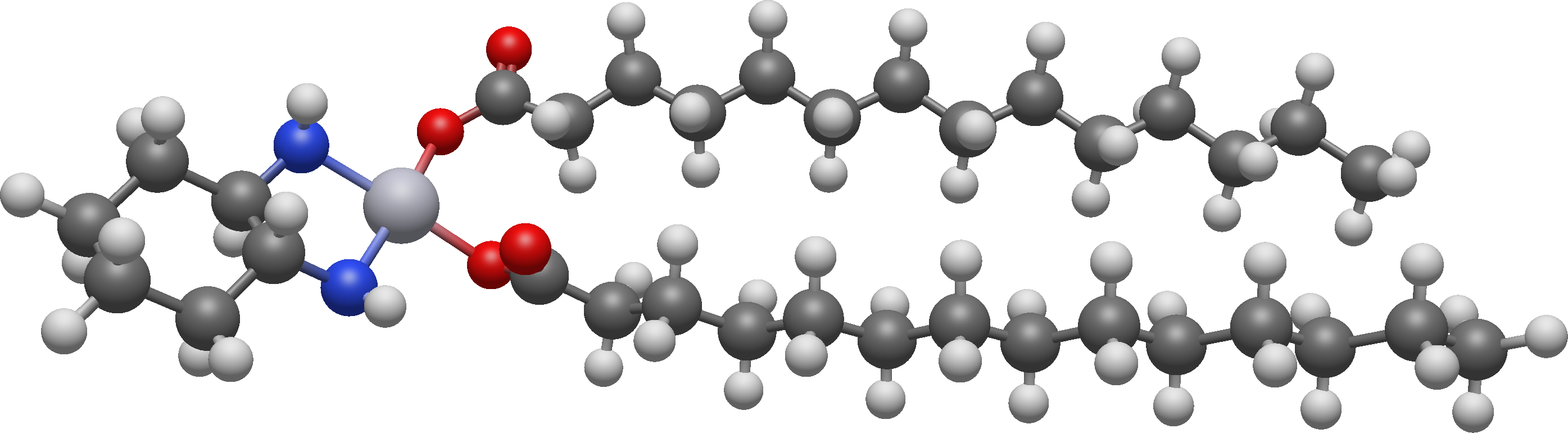

Clinical data
- Trade names: Miripla

Legal status
- Legal status: Rx in Japan

Identifiers
- IUPAC name: Cyclohexane-(1R,2R)-diamineplatinum(II) dimyristate
- CAS Number: 141977-79-9
- PubChem CID: 9832045
- ChemSpider: 8007775
- UNII: 780F0P8N4I
- KEGG: D06294
- CompTox Dashboard (EPA): DTXSID101136455

Chemical and physical data
- Formula: C_{34}H_{68}N_{2}O_{4}Pt
- Molar mass: 764.012 g·mol^{−1}
- 3D model (JSmol): Interactive image
- SMILES: CCCCCCCCCCCCCC(=O)[O-].CCCCCCCCCCCCCC(=O)[O-].C1CC[C@]([H])([C@@]([H])(C1)N)N.[Pt+2]
- InChI: InChI=1S/2C14H28O2.C6H14N2.Pt/c2*1-2-3-4-5-6-7-8-9-10-11-12-13-14(15)16;7-5-3-1-2-4-6(5)8;/h2*2-13H2,1H3,(H,15,16);5-6H,1-4,7-8H2;/q;;;+2/p-2/t;;5-,6-;/m..1./s1; Key:BGIHRZPJIYJKAZ-BLUNCNMSSA-L

Miriplatin (INN; trade name Miripla) is a drug used to treat hepatocellular carcinoma (HCC). It is a lipophilic platinum complex that is used in transcatheter arterial chemoembolization (TACE). Miriplatin was approved by Japan's Pharmaceuticals and Medical Devices Agency in 2009.

== See also ==
- Oxaliplatin
