= Poppy seed oil =

Oil of seeds of opium poppy

Nutritional value per 100 g (3.5 oz)
- Energy: 3,699 kJ (884 kcal)
- Carbohydrates: 0 g
- Fat: 100 g
- Saturated: 11.2 g
- Monounsaturated: 14.2 g
- Polyunsaturated: 74.6 g
- Protein: 22–24 g
Vitamins and minerals
Vitamins	Quantity %DV^{†}
Vitamin E	152% 22.8 mg
- Phytosterols 276 mg
- ^{†}Percentages estimated using US recommendations for adults.

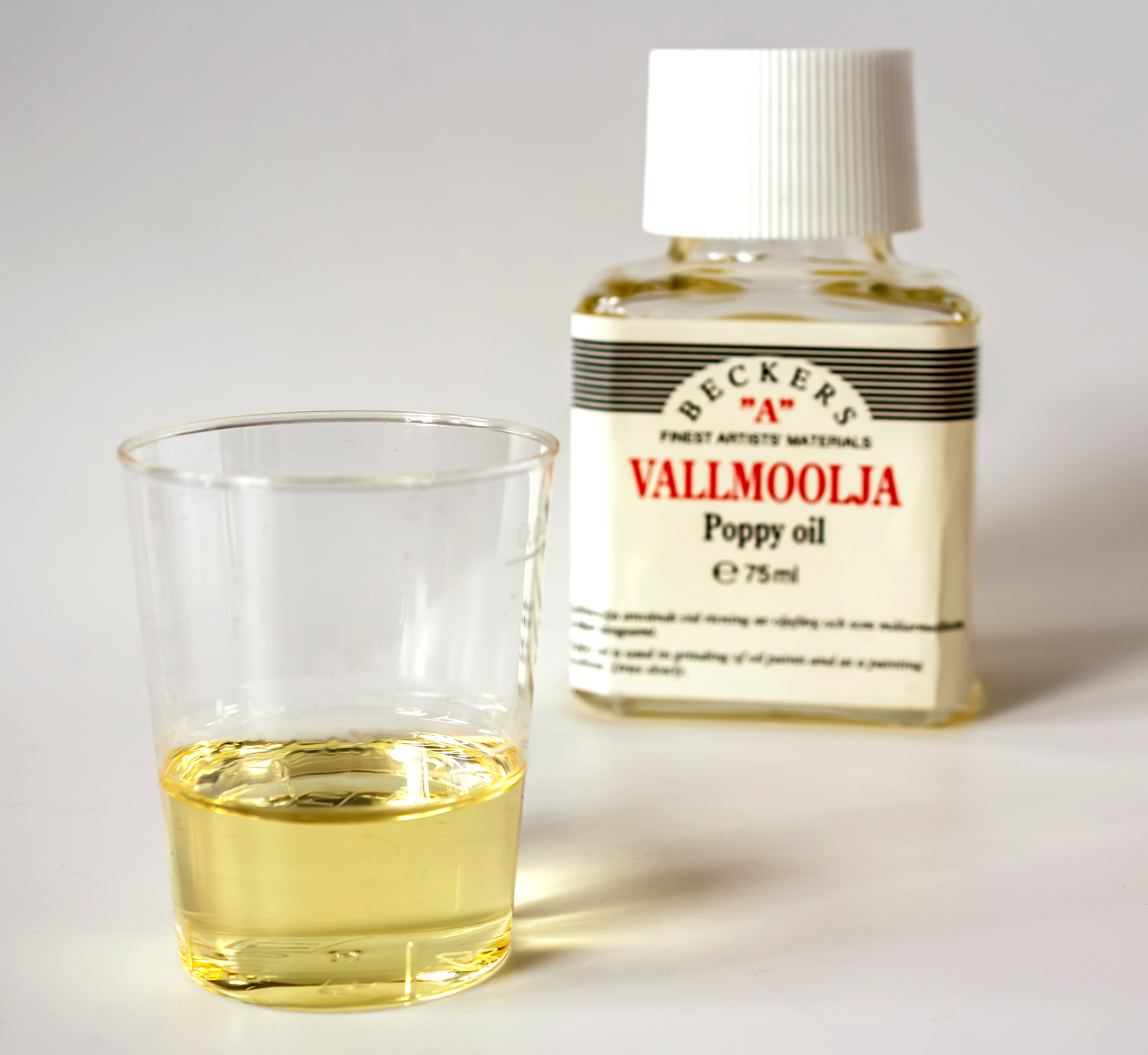
Poppy seed oil for artists' oil paints

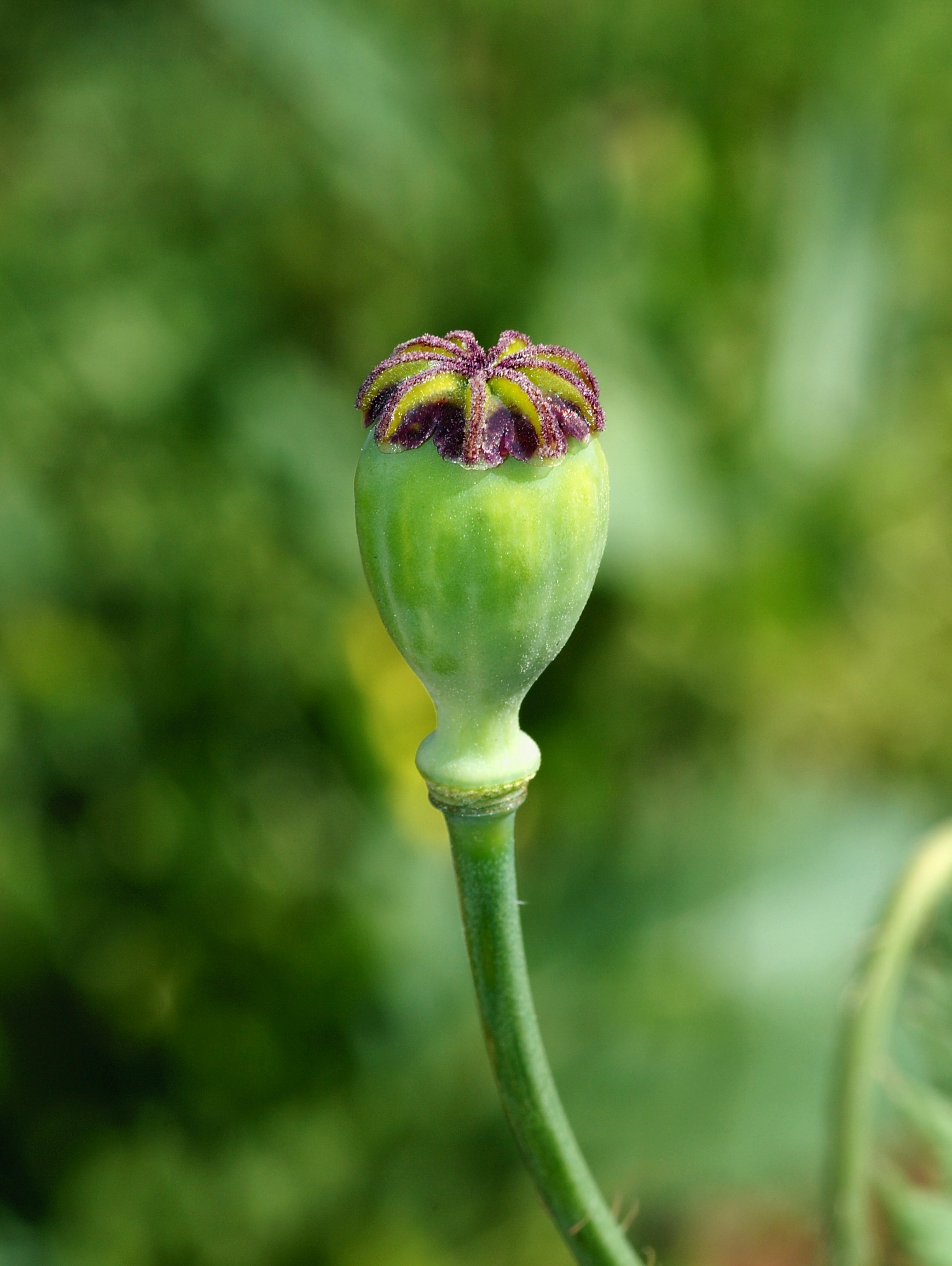
Opium Poppy

Poppy seed oil (also poppyseed oil and poppy oil) is an edible oil obtained from poppy seeds (specifically seeds of Papaver somniferum, the opium poppy).

Poppy seeds yield 45–50% oil. Like poppy seeds, poppy seed oil is highly palatable, high in vitamin E, and has no narcotic properties. Poppy seeds are especially high in tocopherols other than vitamin E (alpha-tocopherol). Compared to other vegetable oils, poppy seed oil has a moderate amount of phytosterols: higher than soybean oil and peanut oil, lower than safflower oil, sesame oil, wheat germ oil, corn oil, and rice bran oil. It has little or no odor and a pleasant taste, and it is less likely than some other oils to become rancid.

== Uses ==
The oil is sometimes used as a cooking oil; it is also used for moisturizing skin. Its primary use, however, is in the manufacture of paints, varnishes, and soaps.

Poppy seed oil is a drying oil. In oil painting, the most popular oil for binding pigment, thinning paint, and varnishing finished paintings is linseed oil. Walnut oil is also favored by oil painters, though each oil is used for a different purpose, with poppy seed oil being used especially in white paints.

While poppy seed oil does not leave the unwanted yellow tint for which linseed oil is known, it is much weaker in the test of time than the contemporary linseed oil. Poppy seed oil dries much more slowly (5–7 days) than linseed oil (3–5 days). For this reason, poppy seed oil should not be used for a ground layer of a painting, and linseed oil should not be painted over a layer of poppy seed oil.

Poppy seed oil is the basis of lipiodol, a radiocontrast agent used in medical radiology and a treatment for iodine deficiency.

== History ==
An early 20th century industry manual states that while the opium poppy was grown extensively in Eurasia, most of the world production of poppy seed oil occurred in France and Germany, from poppy seeds imported from other countries. From 1900 to 1911, France and Germany together produced on the order of 60,000,000 kilograms per year. At that time, poppy seed oil was used primarily to dress salads and frequently was adulterated with sesame oil and hazelnut oil to improve the taste of oil from stored (rancid) seeds. Poppy seed oil was used to adulterate olive oil and peach kernel oil.

== See also ==
- Fat over lean
