= Hypervascularity =

Increased concentration of blood vessels

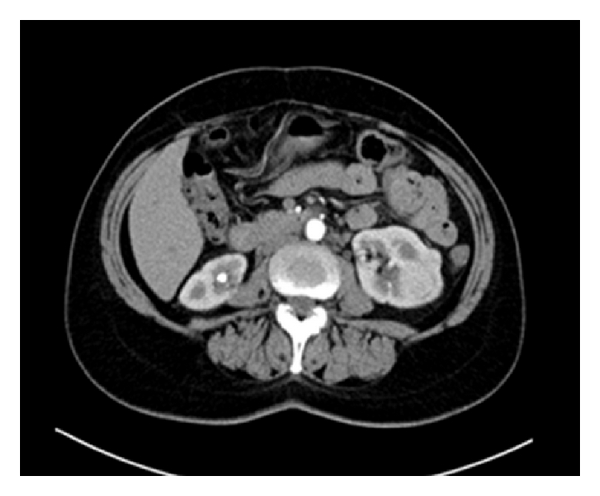
Preoperative contrasted CT scans of the patient, showing multiple bilateral kidney tumors, with diameters ranging between 1 and 5 cm. Radiologically, most of the tumors have malignant characteristics due to their hypervascularity and radiopaque enhancement.

Hypervascularity is an increased number or concentration of blood vessels.

In Graves disease, the thyroid gland is hypervascular, which can help in differentiating the condition from thyroiditis.

90% of thyroid papillary carcinoma cases are hypervascular.

== See also ==
- Angiogenesis
