= List of MeSH codes (D12.125) =

Partial list of the "D" codes for Medical Subject Headings

The following is a partial list of the "D" codes for Medical Subject Headings (MeSH), as defined by the United States National Library of Medicine (NLM).

This list continues the information at List of MeSH codes (D10). Codes following these are found at List of MeSH codes (D12.644). For other MeSH codes, see List of MeSH codes.

The source for this content is the set of 2006 MeSH Trees from the NLM.

== MeSH D12 – amino acids, peptides, and proteins ==
=== MeSH D12.125 – amino acids ===
==== MeSH D12.125.042 – alanine ====
- MeSH D12.125.042.070 – beta-alanine
- MeSH D12.125.042.070.500 – pantothenic acid
- MeSH D12.125.042.475 – lysinoalanine
- MeSH D12.125.042.500 – mimosine

==== MeSH D12.125.065 – amino acid chloromethyl ketones ====
- MeSH D12.125.065.850 – tosyllysine chloromethyl ketone
- MeSH D12.125.065.930 – tosylphenylalanyl chloromethyl ketone

==== MeSH D12.125.067 – amino acids, acidic ====
- MeSH D12.125.067.500 – aspartic acid
- MeSH D12.125.067.500.150 – d-aspartic acid
- MeSH D12.125.067.500.275 – isoaspartic acid
- MeSH D12.125.067.500.400 – n-methylaspartate
- MeSH D12.125.067.500.700 – potassium magnesium aspartate
- MeSH D12.125.067.750 – glutamic acid
- MeSH D12.125.067.750.150 – 1-carboxyglutamic acid
- MeSH D12.125.067.750.400 – glutamates
- MeSH D12.125.067.750.400.700 – polyglutamic acid
- MeSH D12.125.067.750.400.800 – sodium glutamate
- MeSH D12.125.067.750.700 – pyrrolidonecarboxylic acid

==== MeSH D12.125.068 – amino acids, basic ====
- MeSH D12.125.068.050 – arginine
- MeSH D12.125.068.050.075 – argininosuccinic acid
- MeSH D12.125.068.050.095 – benzoylarginine-2-naphthylamide
- MeSH D12.125.068.050.100 – benzoylarginine nitroanilide
- MeSH D12.125.068.050.400 – homoarginine
- MeSH D12.125.068.050.525 – ng-nitroarginine methyl ester
- MeSH D12.125.068.050.587 – nitroarginine
- MeSH D12.125.068.050.650 – omega-n-methylarginine
- MeSH D12.125.068.050.900 – tosylarginine methyl ester
- MeSH D12.125.068.060 – asparagine
- MeSH D12.125.068.330 – glutamine
- MeSH D12.125.068.330.700 – proglumide
- MeSH D12.125.068.555 – lysine
- MeSH D12.125.068.555.478 – hydroxylysine
- MeSH D12.125.068.555.575 – lysinoalanine
- MeSH D12.125.068.555.750 – polylysine
- MeSH D12.125.068.665 – ornithine
- MeSH D12.125.068.665.340 – eflornithine

==== MeSH D12.125.070 – amino acids, branched-chain ====
- MeSH D12.125.070.075 – aminoisobutyric acids
- MeSH D12.125.070.577 – isoleucine
- MeSH D12.125.070.637 – leucine
- MeSH D12.125.070.950 – valine
- MeSH D12.125.070.950.100 – 2-amino-5-phosphonovalerate

==== MeSH D12.125.072 – amino acids, cyclic ====
- MeSH D12.125.072.050 – amino acids, aromatic
- MeSH D12.125.072.050.342 – dextrothyroxine
- MeSH D12.125.072.050.685 – phenylalanine
- MeSH D12.125.072.050.685.400 – dihydroxyphenylalanine
- MeSH D12.125.072.050.685.400.180 – cysteinyldopa
- MeSH D12.125.072.050.685.400.500 – levodopa
- MeSH D12.125.072.050.685.400.600 – methyldopa
- MeSH D12.125.072.050.685.440 – fenclonine
- MeSH D12.125.072.050.685.450 – p-fluorophenylalanine
- MeSH D12.125.072.050.685.500 – melphalan
- MeSH D12.125.072.050.767 – thyroxine
- MeSH D12.125.072.050.767.741 – thyronines
- MeSH D12.125.072.050.767.741.180 – diiodothyronines
- MeSH D12.125.072.050.767.741.894 – triiodothyronine
- MeSH D12.125.072.050.767.741.947 – triiodothyronine, reverse
- MeSH D12.125.072.050.850 – tryptophan
- MeSH D12.125.072.050.850.479 – 5-hydroxytryptophan
- MeSH D12.125.072.050.875 – tyrosine
- MeSH D12.125.072.050.875.064 – betalains
- MeSH D12.125.072.050.875.064.500 – betacyanins
- MeSH D12.125.072.050.875.130 – dihydroxyphenylalanine
- MeSH D12.125.072.050.875.130.180 – cysteinyldopa
- MeSH D12.125.072.050.875.130.500 – levodopa
- MeSH D12.125.072.050.875.130.600 – methyldopa
- MeSH D12.125.072.050.875.262 – diiodotyrosine
- MeSH D12.125.072.050.875.379 – melanins
- MeSH D12.125.072.050.875.496 – monoiodotyrosine
- MeSH D12.125.072.050.875.664 – methyltyrosines
- MeSH D12.125.072.050.875.664.050 – alpha-methyltyrosine
- MeSH D12.125.072.050.875.750 – phosphotyrosine
- MeSH D12.125.072.170 – cycloleucine
- MeSH D12.125.072.200 – desmosine
- MeSH D12.125.072.329 – histidine
- MeSH D12.125.072.329.269 – ergothioneine
- MeSH D12.125.072.329.539 – methylhistidines
- MeSH D12.125.072.401 – imino acids
- MeSH D12.125.072.401.200 – azetidinecarboxylic acid
- MeSH D12.125.072.401.623 – proline
- MeSH D12.125.072.401.623.270 – captopril
- MeSH D12.125.072.401.623.374 – fosinopril
- MeSH D12.125.072.401.623.478 – hydroxyproline
- MeSH D12.125.072.401.761 – pyrrolidonecarboxylic acid
- MeSH D12.125.072.401.830 – technetium tc 99m diethyl-iminodiacetic acid
- MeSH D12.125.072.401.840 – technetium tc 99m disofenin
- MeSH D12.125.072.401.900 – technetium tc 99m lidofenin
- MeSH D12.125.072.415 – isodesmosine

==== MeSH D12.125.095 – amino acids, diamino ====
- MeSH D12.125.095.104 – arginine
- MeSH D12.125.095.104.075 – argininosuccinic acid
- MeSH D12.125.095.104.095 – benzoylarginine-2-naphthylamide
- MeSH D12.125.095.104.100 – benzoylarginine nitroanilide
- MeSH D12.125.095.104.400 – homoarginine
- MeSH D12.125.095.104.525 – ng-nitroarginine methyl ester
- MeSH D12.125.095.104.587 – nitroarginine
- MeSH D12.125.095.104.650 – omega-n-methylarginine
- MeSH D12.125.095.104.900 – tosylarginine methyl ester
- MeSH D12.125.095.165 – asparagine
- MeSH D12.125.095.226 – citrulline
- MeSH D12.125.095.307 – cystathionine
- MeSH D12.125.095.369 – cystine
- MeSH D12.125.095.390 – diaminopimelic acid
- MeSH D12.125.095.461 – glutamine
- MeSH D12.125.095.461.700 – proglumide
- MeSH D12.125.095.533 – homocystine
- MeSH D12.125.095.647 – lysine
- MeSH D12.125.095.647.478 – hydroxylysine
- MeSH D12.125.095.647.575 – lysinoalanine
- MeSH D12.125.095.647.750 – polylysine
- MeSH D12.125.095.765 – ornithine
- MeSH D12.125.095.765.340 – eflornithine

==== MeSH D12.125.119 – amino acids, dicarboxylic ====
- MeSH D12.125.119.075 – 2-aminoadipic acid
- MeSH D12.125.119.170 – aspartic acid
- MeSH D12.125.119.170.150 – d-aspartic acid
- MeSH D12.125.119.170.275 – isoaspartic acid
- MeSH D12.125.119.170.400 – n-methylaspartate
- MeSH D12.125.119.170.700 – potassium magnesium aspartate
- MeSH D12.125.119.270 – carbocysteine
- MeSH D12.125.119.307 – cystathionine
- MeSH D12.125.119.369 – cystine
- MeSH D12.125.119.450 – glutamic acid
- MeSH D12.125.119.450.150 – 1-carboxyglutamic acid
- MeSH D12.125.119.450.400 – glutamates
- MeSH D12.125.119.450.400.700 – polyglutamic acid
- MeSH D12.125.119.450.400.800 – sodium glutamate
- MeSH D12.125.119.658 – homocystine

==== MeSH D12.125.142 – amino acids, essential ====
- MeSH D12.125.142.087 – arginine
- MeSH D12.125.142.087.500 – omega-n-methylarginine
- MeSH D12.125.142.308 – histidine
- MeSH D12.125.142.383 – isoleucine
- MeSH D12.125.142.441 – leucine
- MeSH D12.125.142.497 – lysine
- MeSH D12.125.142.557 – methionine
- MeSH D12.125.142.666 – phenylalanine
- MeSH D12.125.142.815 – threonine
- MeSH D12.125.142.875 – tryptophan
- MeSH D12.125.142.930 – valine

==== MeSH D12.125.154 – amino acids, neutral ====
- MeSH D12.125.154.049 – asparagine
- MeSH D12.125.154.299 – cysteine
- MeSH D12.125.154.424 – glutamine
- MeSH D12.125.154.549 – methionine
- MeSH D12.125.154.800 – serine
- MeSH D12.125.154.900 – threonine

==== MeSH D12.125.166 – amino acids, sulfur ====
- MeSH D12.125.166.175 – cystathionine
- MeSH D12.125.166.215 – cysteic acid
- MeSH D12.125.166.230 – cysteine
- MeSH D12.125.166.230.259 – acetylcysteine
- MeSH D12.125.166.230.310 – carbocysteine
- MeSH D12.125.166.230.330 – cysteinyldopa
- MeSH D12.125.166.230.369 – cystine
- MeSH D12.125.166.230.700 – selenocysteine
- MeSH D12.125.166.388 – ethionine
- MeSH D12.125.166.498 – homocysteine
- MeSH D12.125.166.498.050 – s-adenosylhomocysteine
- MeSH D12.125.166.554 – homocystine
- MeSH D12.125.166.676 – methionine
- MeSH D12.125.166.676.180 – s-adenosylmethionine
- MeSH D12.125.166.676.450 – n-formylmethionine
- MeSH D12.125.166.676.450.440 – n-formylmethionine leucyl-phenylalanine
- MeSH D12.125.166.676.620 – methionine sulfoximine
- MeSH D12.125.166.676.620.125 – buthionine sulfoximine
- MeSH D12.125.166.676.900 – selenomethionine
- MeSH D12.125.166.676.950 – vitamin u
- MeSH D12.125.166.786 – penicillamine
- MeSH D12.125.166.786.500 – s-nitroso-n-acetylpenicillamine
- MeSH D12.125.166.800 – thiopronine
- MeSH D12.125.166.893 – thiorphan

==== MeSH D12.125.190 – aminobutyric acids ====
- MeSH D12.125.190.055 – aminoisobutyric acids
- MeSH D12.125.190.350 – gamma-aminobutyric acid
- MeSH D12.125.190.350.900 – vigabatrin

==== MeSH D12.125.213 – aminocaproic acids ====
- MeSH D12.125.213.075 – 6-aminocaproic acid
- MeSH D12.125.213.568 – norleucine
- MeSH D12.125.213.568.175 – diazooxonorleucine

==== MeSH D12.125.373 – creatine ====
- MeSH D12.125.373.603 – phosphocreatine

==== MeSH D12.125.427 – excitatory amino acids ====
- MeSH D12.125.427.040 – aspartic acid
- MeSH D12.125.427.300 – glutamic acid

==== MeSH D12.125.481 – glycine ====
- MeSH D12.125.481.100 – allylglycine
- MeSH D12.125.481.700 – n-substituted glycines
- MeSH D12.125.481.700.249 – glycocholic acid
- MeSH D12.125.481.700.249.420 – glycodeoxycholic acid
- MeSH D12.125.481.700.249.420.400 – glycochenodeoxycholic acid
- MeSH D12.125.481.700.374 – sarcosine
- MeSH D12.125.481.700.500 – thiopronine
- MeSH D12.125.481.700.750 – thiorphan

==== MeSH D12.125.740 – phosphoamino acids ====
- MeSH D12.125.740.025 – 2-amino-5-phosphonovalerate
- MeSH D12.125.740.675 – phosphocreatine
- MeSH D12.125.740.700 – phosphoserine
- MeSH D12.125.740.725 – phosphothreonine
- MeSH D12.125.740.740 – phosphotyrosine

==== MeSH D12.125.837 – serine ====
- MeSH D12.125.837.075 – azaserine
- MeSH D12.125.837.150 – cycloserine
- MeSH D12.125.837.225 – droxidopa
- MeSH D12.125.837.300 – enterobactin
- MeSH D12.125.837.800 – phosphoserine

==== MeSH D12.125.901 – threonine ====
- MeSH D12.125.901.800 – phosphothreonine

The list continues at List of MeSH codes (D12.644).
