= List of MeSH codes (D10) =

The following is a partial list of the "D" codes for Medical Subject Headings (MeSH), as defined by the United States National Library of Medicine (NLM).

This list continues the information at List of MeSH codes (D09). Codes following these are found at List of MeSH codes (D12). For other MeSH codes, see List of MeSH codes.

The source for this content is the MeSH Browser from the NLM.

== MeSH D10 – lipids ==
=== MeSH D10.212 – fats ===
==== MeSH D10.212.302 – dietary fats ====
- MeSH D10.212.302.199 – butter
- MeSH D10.212.302.199.500 – ghee
- MeSH D10.212.302.347 – cholesterol, dietary
- MeSH D10.212.302.364 – coconut oil
- MeSH D10.212.302.380 – dietary fats, unsaturated
- MeSH D10.212.302.380.360 – cod liver oil
- MeSH D10.212.302.380.370 – corn oil
- MeSH D10.212.302.380.380 – cottonseed oil
- MeSH D10.212.302.380.410 – fatty acids, omega-3
- MeSH D10.212.302.380.410.100 – alpha-linolenic acid
- MeSH D10.212.302.380.410.210 – docosahexaenoic acids
- MeSH D10.212.302.380.410.385 – eicosapentaenoic acid
- MeSH D10.212.302.380.580 – olive oil
- MeSH D10.212.302.380.623 – peanut oil
- MeSH D10.212.302.380.665 – rice bran oil
- MeSH D10.212.302.380.750 – safflower oil
- MeSH D10.212.302.380.775 – sesame oil
- MeSH D10.212.302.380.800 – soybean oil
- MeSH D10.212.302.651 – margarine
- MeSH D10.212.302.825 – palm oil

==== MeSH D10.212.507 – fats, unsaturated ====
- MeSH D10.212.507.300 – castor oil
- MeSH D10.212.507.300.500 – ricinoleic acids
- MeSH D10.212.507.325 – cod liver oil
- MeSH D10.212.507.340 – corn oil
- MeSH D10.212.507.350 – cottonseed oil
- MeSH D10.212.507.375 – croton oil
- MeSH D10.212.507.550 – linseed oil
- MeSH D10.212.507.650 – olive oil
- MeSH D10.212.507.675 – peanut oil
- MeSH D10.212.507.700 – rice bran oil
- MeSH D10.212.507.750 – safflower oil
- MeSH D10.212.507.775 – sesame oil
- MeSH D10.212.507.800 – soybean oil
- MeSH D10.212.507.850 – triolein

=== MeSH D10.251 – fatty acids ===
==== MeSH D10.251.175 – decanoic acids ====
- MeSH D10.251.175.200 – decanoates

==== MeSH D10.251.355 – fatty acids, unsaturated ====
- MeSH D10.251.355.128 – cytochrome p-450 cyp2j2
- MeSH D10.251.355.255 – eicosanoids
- MeSH D10.251.355.255.100 – arachidonic acids
- MeSH D10.251.355.255.100.100 – arachidonic acid
- MeSH D10.251.355.255.100.300 – hydroxyeicosatetraenoic acids
- MeSH D10.251.355.255.100.300.425 – 12-hydroxy-5,8,10,14-eicosatetraenoic acid
- MeSH D10.251.355.255.100.375 – isoprostanes
- MeSH D10.251.355.255.100.375.500 – f2-isoprostanes
- MeSH D10.251.355.255.100.375.750 – neuroprostanes
- MeSH D10.251.355.255.100.450 – leukotrienes
- MeSH D10.251.355.255.100.450.405 – leukotriene a4
- MeSH D10.251.355.255.100.450.411 – leukotriene b4
- MeSH D10.251.355.255.100.450.855 – srs-a
- MeSH D10.251.355.255.100.450.855.455 – leukotriene c4
- MeSH D10.251.355.255.100.450.855.461 – leukotriene d4
- MeSH D10.251.355.255.100.450.855.470 – leukotriene e4
- MeSH D10.251.355.255.100.825 – thromboxanes
- MeSH D10.251.355.255.100.825.800 – thromboxane a2
- MeSH D10.251.355.255.100.825.810 – thromboxane b2
- MeSH D10.251.355.255.200 – eicosapentaenoic acid
- MeSH D10.251.355.255.205 – 5,8,11,14-eicosatetraynoic acid
- MeSH D10.251.355.255.207 – 8,11,14-eicosatrienoic acid
- MeSH D10.251.355.255.375 – lipoxins
- MeSH D10.251.355.255.550 – prostaglandins
- MeSH D10.251.355.255.550.025 – prostaglandin endoperoxides
- MeSH D10.251.355.255.550.025.600 – prostaglandins g
- MeSH D10.251.355.255.550.025.650 – prostaglandins h
- MeSH D10.251.355.255.550.025.650.500 – prostaglandin h2
- MeSH D10.251.355.255.550.025.650.500.500 – 15-hydroxy-11 alpha,9 alpha-(epoxymethano)prosta-5,13-dienoic acid
- MeSH D10.251.355.255.550.100 – prostaglandins a
- MeSH D10.251.355.255.550.150 – prostaglandins b
- MeSH D10.251.355.255.550.200 – prostaglandins d
- MeSH D10.251.355.255.550.200.200 – prostaglandin d2
- MeSH D10.251.355.255.550.250 – prostaglandins e
- MeSH D10.251.355.255.550.250.100 – alprostadil
- MeSH D10.251.355.255.550.250.200 – dinoprostone
- MeSH D10.251.355.255.550.400 – prostaglandins f
- MeSH D10.251.355.255.550.400.200 – dinoprost
- MeSH D10.251.355.255.550.400.350 – 6-ketoprostaglandin f1 alpha
- MeSH D10.251.355.255.550.550 – prostaglandins i
- MeSH D10.251.355.255.550.550.500 – epoprostenol
- MeSH D10.251.355.255.550.775 – prostaglandins, synthetic
- MeSH D10.251.355.255.550.775.125 – iloprost
- MeSH D10.251.355.255.550.775.250 – prostaglandin endoperoxides, synthetic
- MeSH D10.251.355.255.550.775.350 – prostaglandins a, synthetic
- MeSH D10.251.355.255.550.775.450 – prostaglandins e, synthetic
- MeSH D10.251.355.255.550.775.450.050 – arbaprostil
- MeSH D10.251.355.255.550.775.450.300 – 16,16-dimethylprostaglandin e2
- MeSH D10.251.355.255.550.775.450.350 – enprostil
- MeSH D10.251.355.255.550.775.450.500 – misoprostol
- MeSH D10.251.355.255.550.775.450.750 – rioprostil
- MeSH D10.251.355.255.550.775.500 – prostaglandins f, synthetic
- MeSH D10.251.355.255.550.775.500.150 – carboprost
- MeSH D10.251.355.255.550.775.500.175 – cloprostenol
- MeSH D10.251.355.255.550.775.500.175.250 – bimatoprost
- MeSH D10.251.355.255.550.775.500.175.500 – travoprost
- MeSH D10.251.355.255.550.775.500.587 – latanoprost
- MeSH D10.251.355.310 – fatty acids, essential
- MeSH D10.251.355.310.166 – arachidonic acids
- MeSH D10.251.355.310.166.100 – arachidonic acid
- MeSH D10.251.355.310.166.550 – hydroxyeicosatetraenoic acids
- MeSH D10.251.355.310.166.550.425 – 12-hydroxy-5,8,10,14-eicosatetraenoic acid
- MeSH D10.251.355.310.166.775 – isoprostanes
- MeSH D10.251.355.310.166.775.500 – f2-isoprostanes
- MeSH D10.251.355.310.166.775.750 – neuroprostanes
- MeSH D10.251.355.310.166.887 – leukotrienes
- MeSH D10.251.355.310.166.887.405 – leukotriene a4
- MeSH D10.251.355.310.166.887.411 – leukotriene b4
- MeSH D10.251.355.310.166.887.855 – srs-a
- MeSH D10.251.355.310.166.887.855.455 – leukotriene c4
- MeSH D10.251.355.310.166.887.855.461 – leukotriene d4
- MeSH D10.251.355.310.166.887.855.470 – leukotriene e4
- MeSH D10.251.355.310.166.971 – thromboxanes
- MeSH D10.251.355.310.166.971.800 – thromboxane a2
- MeSH D10.251.355.310.166.971.810 – thromboxane b2
- MeSH D10.251.355.310.515 – linoleic acids
- MeSH D10.251.355.310.515.500 – linoleic acid
- MeSH D10.251.355.310.640 – linolenic acids
- MeSH D10.251.355.310.640.400 – alpha-linolenic acid
- MeSH D10.251.355.310.640.425 – gamma-linolenic acid
- MeSH D10.251.355.325 – fatty acids, monounsaturated
- MeSH D10.251.355.325.050 – alprostadil
- MeSH D10.251.355.325.050.500 – lubiprostone
- MeSH D10.251.355.325.190 – capsaicin
- MeSH D10.251.355.325.200 – cilastatin
- MeSH D10.251.355.325.200.500 – cilastatin, imipenem drug combination
- MeSH D10.251.355.325.300 – erucic acids
- MeSH D10.251.355.325.450 – 6-ketoprostaglandin f1 alpha
- MeSH D10.251.355.325.600 – oleic acids
- MeSH D10.251.355.325.600.525 – oleic acid
- MeSH D10.251.355.325.600.780 – ricinoleic acids
- MeSH D10.251.355.325.919 – undecylenic acids
- MeSH D10.251.355.337 – fatty acids, omega-3
- MeSH D10.251.355.337.100 – alpha-linolenic acid
- MeSH D10.251.355.337.250 – docosahexaenoic acids
- MeSH D10.251.355.337.250.500 – neuroprostanes
- MeSH D10.251.355.337.290 – eicosapentaenoic acid
- MeSH D10.251.355.343 – fatty acids, omega-6
- MeSH D10.251.355.343.249 – gamma-linolenic acid
- MeSH D10.251.355.343.500 – linoleic acids
- MeSH D10.251.355.343.500.500 – linoleic acid
- MeSH D10.251.355.343.500.750 – linoleic acids, conjugated
- MeSH D10.251.355.350 – gefarnate
- MeSH D10.251.355.391 – ionomycin
- MeSH D10.251.355.411 – isoprostanes
- MeSH D10.251.355.411.500 – f2-isoprostanes
- MeSH D10.251.355.411.750 – neuroprostanes
- MeSH D10.251.355.645 – oxylipins
- MeSH D10.251.355.840 – sorbic acid
- MeSH D10.251.355.880 – specialized pro-resolving mediators
- MeSH D10.251.355.920 – trans fatty acids

==== MeSH D10.251.400 – fatty acids, volatile ====
- MeSH D10.251.400.045 – acetates
- MeSH D10.251.400.045.500 – acetic acid
- MeSH D10.251.400.143 – butyrates
- MeSH D10.251.400.143.500 – butyric acid
- MeSH D10.251.400.143.687 – crotonates
- MeSH D10.251.400.143.781 – hydroxybutyrates
- MeSH D10.251.400.143.781.500 – 3-hydroxybutyric acid
- MeSH D10.251.400.143.875 – isobutyrates
- MeSH D10.251.400.326 – caproates
- MeSH D10.251.400.706 – propionates
- MeSH D10.251.400.895 – valerates
- MeSH D10.251.400.895.593 – pentanoic acids
- MeSH D10.251.400.895.593.350 – gemfibrozil
- MeSH D10.251.400.895.593.900 – valproic acid

==== MeSH D10.251.450 – heptanoic acids ====
- MeSH D10.251.450.200 – atorvastatin
- MeSH D10.251.450.300 – fluvastatin
- MeSH D10.251.450.400 – heptanoates

==== MeSH D10.251.500 – lauric acids ====
- MeSH D10.251.500.410 – laurates

==== MeSH D10.251.640 – myristic acids ====
- MeSH D10.251.640.610 – myristates
- MeSH D10.251.640.630 – myristic acid

==== MeSH D10.251.694 – palmitic acids ====
- MeSH D10.251.694.600 – palmitates
- MeSH D10.251.694.600.500 – palmitoyl coenzyme a
- MeSH D10.251.694.750 – palmitic acid

==== MeSH D10.251.882 – stearic acids ====
- MeSH D10.251.882.800 – stearates

=== MeSH D10.289 – fatty alcohols ===
==== MeSH D10.289.110 – butanols ====
- MeSH D10.289.110.175 – 1-butanol
- MeSH D10.289.110.220 – chlorobutanol
- MeSH D10.289.110.855 – tert-butyl alcohol

==== MeSH D10.289.220 – dodecanol ====
- MeSH D10.289.220.720 – sodium dodecyl sulfate

==== MeSH D10.289.230 – dolichols ====
- MeSH D10.289.230.250 – dolichol phosphates

==== MeSH D10.289.510 – hexanols ====
- MeSH D10.289.510.500 – cyclohexanols
- MeSH D10.289.510.500.303 – desvenlafaxine succinate
- MeSH D10.289.510.500.454 – eucalyptol
- MeSH D10.289.510.500.605 – menthol
- MeSH D10.289.510.500.802 – tramadol
- MeSH D10.289.510.500.901 – venlafaxine hydrochloride

==== MeSH D10.289.600 – octanols ====
- MeSH D10.289.600.610 – 1-octanol

=== MeSH D10.351 – glycerides ===
==== MeSH D10.351.801 – triglycerides ====
- MeSH D10.351.801.632 – triacetin
- MeSH D10.351.801.801 – triolein

=== MeSH D10.390 – glycolipids ===
==== MeSH D10.390.470 – glycosphingolipids ====
- MeSH D10.390.470.025 – acidic glycosphingolipids
- MeSH D10.390.470.025.475 – gangliosides
- MeSH D10.390.470.025.475.390 – g(m1) ganglioside
- MeSH D10.390.470.025.475.400 – g(m2) ganglioside
- MeSH D10.390.470.025.475.510 – g(m3) ganglioside
- MeSH D10.390.470.025.837 – sulfoglycosphingolipids
- MeSH D10.390.470.675 – neutral glycosphingolipids
- MeSH D10.390.470.675.200 – ceramides
- MeSH D10.390.470.675.200.250 – cerebrosides
- MeSH D10.390.470.675.200.250.450 – galactosylceramides
- MeSH D10.390.470.675.200.250.490 – glucosylceramides
- MeSH D10.390.470.675.200.425 – globosides
- MeSH D10.390.470.675.200.612 – lactosylceramides
- MeSH D10.390.470.675.200.906 – trihexosylceramides
- MeSH D10.390.470.675.870 – sphingomyelins
- MeSH D10.390.470.806 – psychosine

==== MeSH D10.390.700 – polyisoprenyl phosphate sugars ====
- MeSH D10.390.700.700 – polyisoprenyl phosphate monosaccharides
- MeSH D10.390.700.700.250 – dolichol monophosphate mannose
- MeSH D10.390.700.710 – polyisoprenyl phosphate oligosaccharides

=== MeSH D10.477 – lipopeptides ===
==== MeSH D10.477.750 – polymyxins ====
- MeSH D10.477.750.110 – colistin
- MeSH D10.477.750.750 – polymyxin b

=== MeSH D10.532 – lipoproteins ===
==== MeSH D10.532.091 – apolipoproteins ====
- MeSH D10.532.091.100 – apolipoproteins m
- MeSH D10.532.091.200 – apolipoproteins a
- MeSH D10.532.091.200.100 – apolipoprotein a-i
- MeSH D10.532.091.200.150 – apolipoprotein a-ii
- MeSH D10.532.091.200.575 – apolipoprotein a-v
- MeSH D10.532.091.300 – apolipoproteins b
- MeSH D10.532.091.300.240 – apolipoprotein b-48
- MeSH D10.532.091.300.249 – apolipoprotein b-100
- MeSH D10.532.091.400 – apolipoproteins c
- MeSH D10.532.091.400.500 – apolipoprotein c-i
- MeSH D10.532.091.400.750 – apolipoprotein c-ii
- MeSH D10.532.091.400.875 – apolipoprotein c-iii
- MeSH D10.532.091.450 – apolipoproteins d
- MeSH D10.532.091.500 – apolipoproteins e
- MeSH D10.532.091.500.249 – apolipoprotein e2
- MeSH D10.532.091.500.500 – apolipoprotein e3
- MeSH D10.532.091.500.750 – apolipoprotein e4
- MeSH D10.532.091.750 – apolipoproteins l
- MeSH D10.532.091.750.500 – apolipoprotein l1

==== MeSH D10.532.183 – chylomicrons ====
- MeSH D10.532.183.500 – chylomicron remnants

==== MeSH D10.532.350 – lipoprotein(a) ====
- MeSH D10.532.350.500 – apoprotein(a)

==== MeSH D10.532.432 – lipoproteins, hdl ====
- MeSH D10.532.432.400 – cholesterol, hdl
- MeSH D10.532.432.550 – high-density lipoproteins, pre-beta
- MeSH D10.532.432.700 – lipoproteins, hdl2
- MeSH D10.532.432.850 – lipoproteins, hdl3

==== MeSH D10.532.515 – lipoproteins, ldl ====
- MeSH D10.532.515.500 – cholesterol, ldl

==== MeSH D10.532.599 – lipoproteins, vldl ====
- MeSH D10.532.599.700 – cholesterol, vldl

=== MeSH D10.570 – membrane lipids ===
==== MeSH D10.570.755 – phospholipids ====
- MeSH D10.570.755.375 – glycerophosphates
- MeSH D10.570.755.375.760 – phosphatidic acids
- MeSH D10.570.755.375.760.400 – glycerophospholipids
- MeSH D10.570.755.375.760.400.386 – glycerylphosphorylcholine
- MeSH D10.570.755.375.760.400.800 – phosphatidylcholines
- MeSH D10.570.755.375.760.400.800.200 – dimyristoylphosphatidylcholine
- MeSH D10.570.755.375.760.400.800.224 – 1,2-dipalmitoylphosphatidylcholine
- MeSH D10.570.755.375.760.400.800.806 – lecithins
- MeSH D10.570.755.375.760.400.800.806.500 – glycerylphosphorylcholine
- MeSH D10.570.755.375.760.400.840 – phosphatidylethanolamines
- MeSH D10.570.755.375.760.400.885 – phosphatidylglycerols
- MeSH D10.570.755.375.760.400.885.185 – cardiolipins
- MeSH D10.570.755.375.760.400.942 – phosphatidylinositols
- MeSH D10.570.755.375.760.400.942.250 – glycosylphosphatidylinositols
- MeSH D10.570.755.375.760.400.942.625 – phosphatidylinositol phosphates
- MeSH D10.570.755.375.760.400.942.625.900 – phosphatidylinositol 4,5-diphosphate
- MeSH D10.570.755.375.760.400.971 – phosphatidylserines
- MeSH D10.570.755.375.760.400.985 – phospholipid ethers
- MeSH D10.570.755.375.760.400.985.820 – plasmalogens
- MeSH D10.570.755.375.760.400.985.910 – platelet activating factor
- MeSH D10.570.755.375.760.550 – lysophospholipids
- MeSH D10.570.755.375.760.550.550 – lysophosphatidylcholines
- MeSH D10.570.755.893 – sphingomyelins

==== MeSH D10.570.780 – proteolipids ====
- MeSH D10.570.780.249 – myelin and lymphocyte-associated proteolipid proteins
- MeSH D10.570.780.500 – myelin proteolipid protein

==== MeSH D10.570.877 – sphingolipids ====
- MeSH D10.570.877.360 – glycosphingolipids
- MeSH D10.570.877.360.025 – acidic glycosphingolipids
- MeSH D10.570.877.360.025.475 – gangliosides
- MeSH D10.570.877.360.025.475.390 – g(m1) ganglioside
- MeSH D10.570.877.360.025.475.400 – g(m2) ganglioside
- MeSH D10.570.877.360.025.475.510 – g(m3) ganglioside
- MeSH D10.570.877.360.025.837 – sulfoglycosphingolipids
- MeSH D10.570.877.360.612 – neutral glycosphingolipids
- MeSH D10.570.877.360.612.200 – ceramides
- MeSH D10.570.877.360.612.200.250 – cerebrosides
- MeSH D10.570.877.360.612.200.250.450 – galactosylceramides
- MeSH D10.570.877.360.612.200.250.490 – glucosylceramides
- MeSH D10.570.877.360.612.200.425 – globosides
- MeSH D10.570.877.360.612.200.612 – lactosylceramides
- MeSH D10.570.877.360.612.200.906 – trihexosylceramides
- MeSH D10.570.877.360.612.870 – sphingomyelins
- MeSH D10.570.877.360.806 – psychosine

==== MeSH D10.570.938 – sterols ====
- MeSH D10.570.938.073 – adosterol
- MeSH D10.570.938.146 – cholecalciferol
- MeSH D10.570.938.146.478 – hydroxycholecalciferols
- MeSH D10.570.938.146.478.250 – calcifediol
- MeSH D10.570.938.146.478.387 – dihydroxycholecalciferols
- MeSH D10.570.938.146.478.387.300 – calcitriol
- MeSH D10.570.938.146.478.387.400 – 24,25-dihydroxyvitamin d 3
- MeSH D10.570.938.208 – cholesterol
- MeSH D10.570.938.208.070 – azacosterol
- MeSH D10.570.938.208.160 – cholestanol
- MeSH D10.570.938.208.222 – cholesterol, dietary
- MeSH D10.570.938.208.250 – cholesterol esters
- MeSH D10.570.938.208.270 – cholesterol, hdl
- MeSH D10.570.938.208.275 – cholesterol, ldl
- MeSH D10.570.938.208.285 – cholesterol, vldl
- MeSH D10.570.938.208.320 – dehydrocholesterols
- MeSH D10.570.938.208.320.297 – desmosterol
- MeSH D10.570.938.208.627 – 19-iodocholesterol
- MeSH D10.570.938.208.825 – oxysterols
- MeSH D10.570.938.208.825.500 – hydroxycholesterols
- MeSH D10.570.938.208.825.750 – ketocholesterols
- MeSH D10.570.938.439 – ergocalciferols
- MeSH D10.570.938.439.500 – 25-hydroxyvitamin d 2
- MeSH D10.570.938.439.750 – dihydrotachysterol
- MeSH D10.570.938.515 – fusidic acid
- MeSH D10.570.938.590 – lanosterol
- MeSH D10.570.938.795 – phytosterols
- MeSH D10.570.938.795.071 – brassinosteroids
- MeSH D10.570.938.795.143 – ecdysteroids
- MeSH D10.570.938.795.669 – sitosterols
- MeSH D10.570.938.795.808 – stigmasterol
- MeSH D10.570.938.795.904 – withanolides
- MeSH D10.570.938.897 – solanine

=== MeSH D10.627 – oils ===
==== MeSH D10.627.430 – fish oils ====
- MeSH D10.627.430.354 – cod liver oil
- MeSH D10.627.430.450 – fatty acids, omega-3
- MeSH D10.627.430.450.375 – docosahexaenoic acids
- MeSH D10.627.430.450.390 – eicosapentaenoic acid

==== MeSH D10.627.675 – oils, volatile ====
- MeSH D10.627.675.775 – tea tree oil
- MeSH D10.627.675.800 – turpentine

==== MeSH D10.627.700 – plant oils ====
- MeSH D10.627.700.033 – eucalyptus oil
- MeSH D10.627.700.066 – rapeseed oil
- MeSH D10.627.700.132 – castor oil
- MeSH D10.627.700.186 – coconut oil
- MeSH D10.627.700.240 – corn oil
- MeSH D10.627.700.263 – cottonseed oil
- MeSH D10.627.700.315 – croton oil
- MeSH D10.627.700.550 – iodized oil
- MeSH D10.627.700.550.300 – ethiodized oil
- MeSH D10.627.700.615 – linseed oil
- MeSH D10.627.700.728 – olive oil
- MeSH D10.627.700.798 – palm oil
- MeSH D10.627.700.809 – peanut oil
- MeSH D10.627.700.819 – rice bran oil
- MeSH D10.627.700.840 – safflower oil
- MeSH D10.627.700.865 – sesame oil
- MeSH D10.627.700.880 – soybean oil
- MeSH D10.627.700.940 – tea tree oil

=== MeSH D10.945 – waxes ===
==== MeSH D10.945.507 – lanolin ====
The list continues at List of MeSH codes (D12).
