= Dopa =

Dopa or DOPA may refer to:

- Dihydroxyphenylalanine (DOPA)
  - L-DOPA (levodopa), used in the treatment of Parkinson's disease
  - D-DOPA, an enantiomer of L-DOPA
- 3,4-Dihydroxyphenylacetic acid or DOPAC, a metabolite of dopamine
- Dopa, an angel in Enochian
- Deleting Online Predators Act of 2006
- Department of Provincial Administration (DOPA), a department under the Ministry of Interior in Thailand
