= Linolenate 9R-lipoxygenase =

Identifiers
- EC no.: 1.13.11.61

Databases
- IntEnz: IntEnz view
- BRENDA: BRENDA entry
- ExPASy: NiceZyme view
- KEGG: KEGG entry
- MetaCyc: metabolic pathway
- PRIAM: profile
- PDB structures: RCSB PDB PDBe PDBsum
Search
- PMC: articles
- PubMed: articles
- NCBI: proteins

Linolenate 9R-lipoxygenase (EC 1.13.11.61, NspLOX, (9R)-LOX, linoleate 9R-dioxygenase) is an enzyme with systematic name alpha-linolenate:oxygen (9R)-oxidoreductase. This enzyme catalyses the following chemical reaction

alpha-linolenate + O_{2} $\rightleftharpoons$ (9R,10E,12Z,15Z)-9-hydroperoxyoctadeca-10,12,15-trienoate

In cyanobacteria the enzyme is involved in oxylipin biosynthesis.
