= Mir-939 microRNA precursor family =

mir-939

Identifiers
- Symbol: mir-939
- Rfam: RF00981
- miRBase family: MIPF0000490

Other data
- RNA type: microRNA
- Domain: Eukaryota;
- PDB structures: PDBe

In molecular biology mir-939 microRNA is a short RNA molecule. MicroRNAs function to regulate the expression levels of other genes by several mechanisms.

== Human inducible Nitric Oxide Synthase ==
miR-939 directly regulates and translationally blocks the gene expression of human inducible nitric oxide synthase (hiNOS) by binding to its 3'UTR. There is dual regulation of hiNOS gene expression, with cytokines inducing hiNOS transcription whilst also increasing miR-939 levels. Two functional binding sites within the hiNOS 3'UTR are essential for miR-939-mediated translational blockade and miR-939 has been shown to decrease cytokine-induced hiNOS expression, despite hiNOS mRNA levels and stability remaining unaffected. It has further been found that endogenous miR-939 expression in the liver may be induced by cytokines.

== See also ==
- MicroRNA
