= C9H11NO4 =

The molecular formula C_{9}H_{11}NO_{4} (molar mass: 197.19 g/mol) may refer to:

- D-DOPA
- L-DOPA (or levodopa)
