= Linoleate 10R-lipoxygenase =

Identifiers
- EC no.: 1.13.11.62

Databases
- IntEnz: IntEnz view
- BRENDA: BRENDA entry
- ExPASy: NiceZyme view
- KEGG: KEGG entry
- MetaCyc: metabolic pathway
- PRIAM: profile
- PDB structures: RCSB PDB PDBe PDBsum
Search
- PMC: articles
- PubMed: articles
- NCBI: proteins

Linoleate 10R-lipoxygenase (EC 1.13.11.62, 10R-DOX, (10R)-dioxygenase, 10R-dioxygenase) is an enzyme with systematic name linoleate:oxygen (10R)-oxidoreductase. This enzyme catalyses the following chemical reaction

linoleate + O_{2} $\rightleftharpoons$ (8E,10R,12Z)-10-hydroperoxy-8,12-octadecadienoate

Linoleate 10R-lipoxygenase is involved in biosynthesis of oxylipins.
