= ATG9B =

Protein-coding gene in the species Homo sapiens

Identifiers
- Aliases: ATG9B, APG9L2, NOS3AS, SONE, autophagy related 9B
- External IDs: OMIM: 612205; MGI: 2685420; GeneCards: ATG9B

Gene location (Human)
Chr.	Chromosome 7 (human)
Band	7q36.1	Start	151,012,209 bp
Band	7q36.1	End	151,024,499 bp

Gene location (Mouse)
Chr.	Chromosome 5 (mouse)
Band	5 A3|5 11.49 cM	Start	24,589,179 bp
Band	5 A3|5 11.49 cM	End	24,597,141 bp
RNA expression pattern
Bgee	Human / Mouse (ortholog); Top expressed in: skin of leg; skin of abdomen; right testis; skin of arm; left testis; right uterine tube; testicle; anterior pituitary; buccal mucosa cell; amniotic fluid / Top expressed in: lip; esophagus; skin of back; skin of external ear; hair follicle; lumbar subsegment of spinal cord; umbilical cord; morula; supraoptic nucleus; embryo; More reference expression data
BioGPS	n/a
Orthologs
Databases	NCBI: entry; OMA: entry
Species	Human	Mouse
Entrez	285973	213948
Ensembl	ENSG00000181652	ENSMUSG00000038295
UniProt	Q674R7	Q6EBV9
RefSeq (mRNA)	NM_001317056	NM_001002897
RefSeq (protein)	NP_001303985; NP_775952	NP_001002897
Location (UCSC)	Chr 7: 151.01 – 151.02 Mb	Chr 5: 24.59 – 24.6 Mb
PubMed search
- Wikidata
View/Edit Human	View/Edit Mouse

Autophagy related 9B is a protein that in humans is encoded by the ATG9B gene.

== Function ==
This gene functions in the regulation of autophagy, a lysosomal degradation pathway. This gene also functions as an antisense transcript in the post-transcriptional regulation of the endothelial nitric oxide synthase 3 gene, which has 3' overlap with this gene on the opposite strand. Mutations in this gene and disruption of the autophagy process have been associated with multiple cancers. Alternative splicing results in multiple transcript variants.
