= OR5V1 =

Protein-coding gene in the species Homo sapiens

Identifiers
- Aliases: OR5V1, 6M1-21, hs6M1-21, olfactory receptor family 5 subfamily V member 1
- External IDs: MGI: 2177493; GeneCards: OR5V1

Gene location (Human)
Chr.	Chromosome 6 (human)
Band	6p22.1	Start	29,353,749 bp
Band	6p22.1	End	29,431,967 bp

Gene location (Mouse)
Chr.	Chromosome 17 (mouse)
Band	17|17 B1	Start	37,803,359 bp
Band	17|17 B1	End	37,811,098 bp
RNA expression pattern
Bgee	Human / Mouse (ortholog); Top expressed in: testicle; left testis; right testis; caudate nucleus; hypothalamus / Top expressed in: olfactory bulb; More reference expression data
BioGPS	n/a
Gene ontology
Molecular function	G protein-coupled receptor activity; olfactory receptor activity; signal transducer activity
Cellular component	integral component of membrane; plasma membrane; membrane
Biological process	sensory perception of smell; signal transduction; response to stimulus; detection of chemical stimulus involved in sensory perception of smell; G protein-coupled receptor signaling pathway
Sources:Amigo / QuickGO
Orthologs
Databases	NCBI: entry; OMA: entry
Species	Human	Mouse
Entrez	81696	258325
Ensembl	ENSG00000112461; ENSG00000227137; ENSG00000243441; ENSG00000243729; ENSG00000233046 ENSG00000230742; ENSG00000240130; ENSG00000242289	ENSMUSG00000090894
UniProt	Q9UGF6	A2RT31
RefSeq (mRNA)	NM_030876	NM_146328
RefSeq (protein)	NP_110503	NP_666440
Location (UCSC)	Chr 6: 29.35 – 29.43 Mb	Chr 17: 37.8 – 37.81 Mb
PubMed search
- Wikidata
View/Edit Human	View/Edit Mouse

Olfactory receptor 5V1 is a protein that in humans is encoded by the OR5V1 gene.

Olfactory receptors interact with odorant molecules in the nose, to initiate a neuronal response that triggers the perception of a smell. The olfactory receptor proteins are members of a large family of G-protein-coupled receptors (GPCR) arising from single coding-exon genes. Olfactory receptors share a 7-transmembrane domain structure with many neurotransmitter and hormone receptors and are responsible for the recognition and G protein-mediated transduction of odorant signals. The olfactory receptor gene family is the largest in the genome. The nomenclature assigned to the olfactory receptor genes and proteins for this organism is independent of other organisms.

Functional studies of the mouse ortholog (Olfr110) have identified this receptor as a high-affinity sensor for the oxylipin 12(S)-hydroxyeicosapentaenoic acid (12(S)-HEPE), revealing a role beyond classical odorant detection in regulating metabolism. Engagement of this receptor by oxylipins activates G_{s}-dependent signaling pathways that promote fatty acid oxidation and influence glucose homeostasis, indicating a potential role for OR5V1 in metabolic processes and as a therapeutic target for metabolic disorders.

== See also ==
- Olfactory receptor
