= C27H45IO =

The molecular formula C_{27}H_{45}IO (molar mass: 512.55 g/mol, exact mass: 512.2515 u) may refer to:

- Adosterol
- Iodocholesterol, or 19-iodocholesterol
