= Harvey Levy =

Harvey Levy may refer to:

- Harvey Levy (American football) (1902–1986), American football player
- Harvey Levy (academic), American geneticist
