= Harvey Levy (academic) =

American geneticist

Harvey Louis Levy is an American biochemical geneticist, pediatrician, physician scientist and academic. He is Senior Physician in Medicine and Genetics at Boston Children’s Hospital and Professor of Pediatrics at Harvard Medical School.

Levy is an internationally known for his pioneering work in newborn screening for metabolic diseases as well as having established much of current understanding of major biochemical genetic disorders such as homocystinuria, phenylketonuria (PKU), and maternal PKU. Levy has published over 400 papers on biochemical genetic disorders and newborn screening. He developed the basis for biochemical and clinical investigation of the inborn errors of metabolism identified by newborn screening. He and Harvey Mudd of the National Institutes of Health discovered the first human defect in vitamin B12 expanding the concept of sulfur amino acid disorders.

Levy is the recipient of numerous awards including the Robert Guthrie Award for Research in Biochemical Genetics, Asbjørn Følling Award for Research in Phenylketonuria, and the David L. Rimoin Lifetime Achievement Award. He was a founder and Past President of the Society for Inherited Metabolic Disorders and a member of the American Society for Human Genetics, Society for the Study of Inborn Errors of Metabolism, the International Society for Neonatal Screening, the American College of Medical Genetics, and Emeritus member of the American Pediatric Society and the Society for Pediatric Research.

== Education ==
Born in Augusta, Georgia, Levy received his undergraduate education at Emory University and then accepted early admission to the Medical College of Georgia from which he received his MD degree in 1960.

=== Medical training ===
Following completion of medical school, Levy served as a Pediatrics intern at Boston City Hospital and then as a resident in Pediatric Pathology at Columbia-Presbyterian Medical Center in New York. Drafted into the military Levy served as a medical officer in the United States Navy during the very early years of the Vietnam War. He returned to the United States in 1964 serving as a second year resident in Pediatrics at the Johns Hopkins Hospital in Baltimore following which he rejoined the Boston City Hospital as Chief Resident of Pediatrics. In 1966 he moved to the Massachusetts General Hospital in Boston where he was a Research Fellow in Metabolism and Pediatric Neurology Research in the Joseph P. Kennedy, Jr. Laboratories.

== Career and research ==
After completion of his training Levy was appointed to the medical staff of the Massachusetts General Hospital where he served as Assistant Neurologist and Associate Pediatrician as well as Associate Professor of Neurology at the Harvard Medical School. During this period he also served as Director of the Massachusetts Metabolic Disorders Screening Program and, subsequently, Chief of Biochemical Genetics of the New England Newborn Screening Program. In 1978 Levy moved to the Boston Children’s Hospital where he expanded the PKU Clinic into the Metabolic Program.

Levy's work in both newborn screening and genetic disorders has received global recognition. Early in his career Levy began a close collaboration with Robert Guthrie, the founder of newborn screening. Recognizing a gap between public health newborn screening and the medical community, he became the first physician to combine newborn screening with the diagnosis, treatment and research of the disorders identified by screening. Continuing his research at the Massachusetts general Hospital Levy with Harvey Mudd of the National Institutes of Health published the first report of a human vitamin B12 defect that identified the vital role of B12 in metabolism and greatly expanded the concept of homocystinuria and its relationship to B12. Levy is also renowned for clinical research in phenylketonuria (PKU), including bringing international attention to maternal PKU, a major complication of PKU.

== Awards and honors ==
- 1972 - Alfred L. Frechette Award for Public Health, Massachusetts Department of Public Health
- 1997 - Robert Guthrie Award in World-Wide Recognition of Outstanding Contributions to Newborn Screening, International Society for Neonatal Screening
- 2003 - Allen Crocker Award, New England Regional Genetics Group
- 2012 - Asbjørn Følling Award, European Society for Phenylketonuria
- 2015 - Harland Sanders Award for Lifetime Achievement in Genetics, March of Dimes
- 2019 – Naming of the Dr. Harvey Levy Program for Phenylketonuria and Related Conditions, Boston Children’s Hospital
- 2020 - David L. Rimoin Lifetime Achievement Award in Medical Genetics, ACMG Foundation for Genetic and Genomic Medicine

== Selected articles ==
- Levy HL. Genetic Screening. In: Harris H, Hirschhorn K, eds. Advances in Human Genetics. Vol. 4. New York: Plenum Press; 1973:1-104.
- Levy HL, Mudd SH, Schulman JD, Dreyfus P, Abeles H. A Derangement in B12 Metabolism Associated with Homocystinemia, Cystathioninemia, Hypomethioninemia, and Methylmalonic Aciduria. American Journal of Medicine 1970;48:390-397.
- Lenke RR, Levy HL. Maternal Phenylketonuria and Hyperphenylalaninemia. An International Survey of the Outcome of Untreated and Treated Pregnancies. New England Journal of Medicine 1980;303:1202-1208.
- Levy HL, Waisbren SE. Effects of Untreated Maternal Phenylketonuria and Hyperphenylalaninemia on the fetus. New England Journal of Medicine 1983;309:1269-1274.
- Levy HL, Sarkissian CN, Scriver CR. Phenylalanine Ammonia Lyase (PAL): From Discovery to Enzyme Substitution Therapy for Phenylketonuria. Molecular Genetics and Metabolism 2018;124:223-229.
