= Nitric-oxide synthase (flavodoxin) =

Class of enzymes

Identifiers
- EC no.: 1.14.14.47

Databases
- IntEnz: IntEnz view
- BRENDA: BRENDA entry
- ExPASy: NiceZyme view
- KEGG: KEGG entry
- MetaCyc: metabolic pathway
- PRIAM: profile
- PDB structures: RCSB PDB PDBe PDBsum
Search
- PMC: articles
- PubMed: articles
- NCBI: proteins

Nitric-oxide synthase (flavodoxin) (EC 1.14.14.47, nitric oxide synthetase, NO synthase) is an enzyme with systematic name L-arginine,reduced flavodoxin:oxygen oxidoreductase (nitric-oxide-forming). This enzyme catalyses the following chemical reaction

2 L-arginine + 3 reduced flavodoxin + 3 H^{+} + 4 O_{2} $\rightleftharpoons$ 2 L-citrulline + 2 nitric oxide + 3 oxidized flavodoxin + 4 H_{2}O (overall reaction)
(1a) 2 L-arginine + 2 reduced flavodoxin 2 H^{+} + 2 O_{2} $\rightleftharpoons$ 2 N^{ω}-hydroxy-L-arginine + 2 oxidized flavodoxin + 2 H_{2}O
(1b) 2 N^{ω}-hydroxy-L-arginine + reduced flavodoxin + H^{+} + 2 O_{2} $\rightleftharpoons$ 2 L-citrulline + 2 nitric oxide + oxidized flavodoxin + 2 H_{2}O

Binds heme (iron protoporphyrin IX) and tetrahydrobiopterin. The enzyme, found in bacteria and archaea, consist of only an oxygenase domain and functions together with bacterial ferredoxins or flavodoxins. The orthologous enzymes from plants and animals also contain a reductase domain and use only NADPH as the electron donor (cf. EC 1.14.13.39).

Note: the EC number 1.14.14.47 was formerly assigned to nitric-oxide synthase (NAD(P)H-dependent). It was merged with EC 1.14.13.165 nitric-oxide synthase (flavodoxin) in 2017.

== See also ==
- Nitric oxide synthase
