= Homoarginine =

- L-Homoarginine

Names
- IUPAC name (2S)-2-Amino-6-(diaminomethylideneamino)hexanoic acid
- Other names: N6-(Aminoiminomethyl)lysine; N6-Amidinolysine; 2-Amino-6-guanidinohexanoic acid

Identifiers
CAS Number	156-86-5
3D model (JSmol)	Interactive image
ChemSpider	8732
EC Number	216-045-6
PubChem CID	9085
UNII	JF751CK38I
- InChI: InChI=1S/C7H16N4O2/c8-5(6(12)13)3-1-2-4-11-7(9)10/h5H,1-4,8H2,(H,12,13)(H4,9,10,11)/t5-/m0/s1 Key: QUOGESRFPZDMMT-YFKPBYRVSA-N
- SMILES: C(CCN=C(N)N)C[C@@H](C(=O)O)N

Properties
Chemical formula	C_{7}H_{16}N_{4}O_{2}
Molar mass	188.231 g·mol^{−1}
Appearance	White crystalline powder
Density	1.39 g/cm^{−3}
Boiling point	414.1 °C (777.4 °F; 687.2 K) 760 mmHg
Solubility in water	soluble
Vapor pressure	1.06×10^{–6} mmHg at 25°C
Refractive index (n_{D})	1.586
- Except where otherwise noted, data are given for materials in their standard state (at 25 °C [77 °F], 100 kPa). Infobox references

Homoarginine is an nonproteinogenic alpha-amino acid. It is structurally equivalent to a one-methylene group-higher homolog of arginine and to the guanidino derivative of lysine. L-Homoarginine is the naturally occurring enantiomer. Physiologically, homoarginine increases nitric oxide (NO) supply and betters endothelial functions in the body, with a particular correlation and effect towards cardiovascular outcome and mortality. At physiological pH, homoarginine is cationic: the guanidino group is protonated.

== Occurrences ==
Homoarginine is a growth inhibitor of Staphylococcus aureus, Escherichia Coli and Candida albicans, indicating it inhibits particular microbial growth and germination pathways. Homoarginine is assumed to be an antimetabolite of arginine. Many studies have shown that it acts as a competitive inhibitor in most cases, but there are also controversial studies showing that it is also an organ specific, non-competitive inhibitor as well. Studies have also shown that it is toxic when targeting Insecta and Rattus norvegicus. In its inhibition, is also often found in occurrences with the lungs, cervix, testis and is an inhibitor of bone and liver-specific alkaline phosphatase enzymes. This amino acid derivative is also found in occurrence with murine osteosarcoma cell proliferation.

Levels of homoarginine have been found to increase during pregnancy, but more studies are underway to confirm this thoroughly.

== Production ==
Homoarginine is formed as a derivative from lysine through reactions similar to those of the urea cycle. Just as in the urea cycle, in its synthesis, ornithine is replaced by lysine. Ornithine transcarbamylase is the main enzyme for homoarginine synthesis. The production of homoarginine is based around the activity of this enzyme. Although ornithine transcarbamylase has a higher affinity to ornithine, it ends up catalyzing the transaminidation reaction of lysine as well, which starts homoarginine production. The reason it also catalyzes this reaction with lysine is because of the low substrate selectivity in the reaction.

Another pathway for the production of Homoarginine includes glycine amidinotransferase (AGAT). This enzyme normally acts through the transfer of an amidino group from arginine to glycine, resulting in formation of guanidinoacetic acid, which is subsequently methylated by guanidinoacetate methyltransferase (GAMT) to form creatine. However, glycine amidinotransferase (AGAT) sometimes acts by using lysine instead of glycine in the reaction, therefore lysine becomes the acceptor of the amidino group, resulting in the production of homoarginine.

== Reactions ==
Homoarginine can increase the availability of nitric oxide, and this is the basis of many of its functions. It can serve as a substrate for NO synthase itself. It can also inhibit arginase, an enzyme that competes with NO synthase for arginine. The resulting increase in the intracellular concentration of arginine leads to increased production of NO from it by NO synthase.

== Uses ==
Homoarginine is used clinical studies, often with rats, to explore its effects on cardiovascular health by acting as an inhibitor for organ-specific reactions as well as a stimulator in some cases.

A recent study was done on the topic of homoarginine related to heart failure and sudden cardiac death in haemodialysis patients. The study was done on 1255 diabetic haemodialysis patients throughout a median of 4 years of follow-up. Results showed a range of different events such as sudden cardiac death, myocardial infarction, stroke, and even death due to heart failure. The study calculations showed that the risk of sudden cardiac death had a threefold increase in the presence of per unit decrease of homoarginine. This explained the strong association of congestive heart failure and left ventricular hypertrophy with low homoarginine levels. Furthermore, this study presented evidence towards increased risk of stroke with low concentrations of homoarginine. Yet, some cases such as myocardial infarction did not show any significance towards low levels of homoarginine correlation.
