= Cysteinyldopa =

Names
- IUPAC name 2-Amino-3-[3-[(2-amino-3-hydroxy-3-oxopropyl)thio]-4,5-dihydroxyphenyl]propanoic acid
- Other names 5-S-Cysteinyldopa

Identifiers
CAS Number	19641-92-0
3D model (JSmol)	Interactive image
ChEMBL	ChEMBL158934
ChemSpider	27618
MeSH	Cysteinyldopa
PubChem CID	29719
UNII	6I8HV27IUT
- InChI: InChI=1S/C12H16N2O6S/c13-6(11(17)18)1-5-2-8(15)10(16)9(3-5)21-4-7(14)12(19)20/h2-3,6-7,15-16H,1,4,13-14H2,(H,17,18)(H,19,20) Key: SXISMOAILJWTID-UHFFFAOYSA-N; InChI=1/C12H16N2O6S/c13-6(11(17)18)1-5-2-8(15)10(16)9(3-5)21-4-7(14)12(19)20/h2-3,6-7,15-16H,1,4,13-14H2,(H,17,18)(H,19,20) Key: SXISMOAILJWTID-UHFFFAOYAI
- SMILES: O=C(O)C(N)Cc1cc(SCC(C(=O)O)N)c(O)c(O)c1

Properties
Chemical formula	C_{12}H_{16}N_{2}O_{6}S
Molar mass	316.33 g·mol^{−1}
- Except where otherwise noted, data are given for materials in their standard state (at 25 °C [77 °F], 100 kPa). verify (what is ?) Infobox references

Cysteinyldopa, or 5-S-cysteinyldopa, is a catecholamine. Excessive cysteinyldopa in plasma and urine has been linked to melanoma. Cysteinyldopa is found in large amounts in the plasma and urine of patients with melanoma. It is therefore used in the diagnosis of melanoma and for the detection of postoperative metastases. Cysteinyldopa is believed to be formed by the rapid enzymatic hydrolysis of 5-S-glutathionedopa found in melanin-producing cells.

== See also ==
- L-DOPA
- D-DOPA
