= Isofuran =

Class of chemical compounds

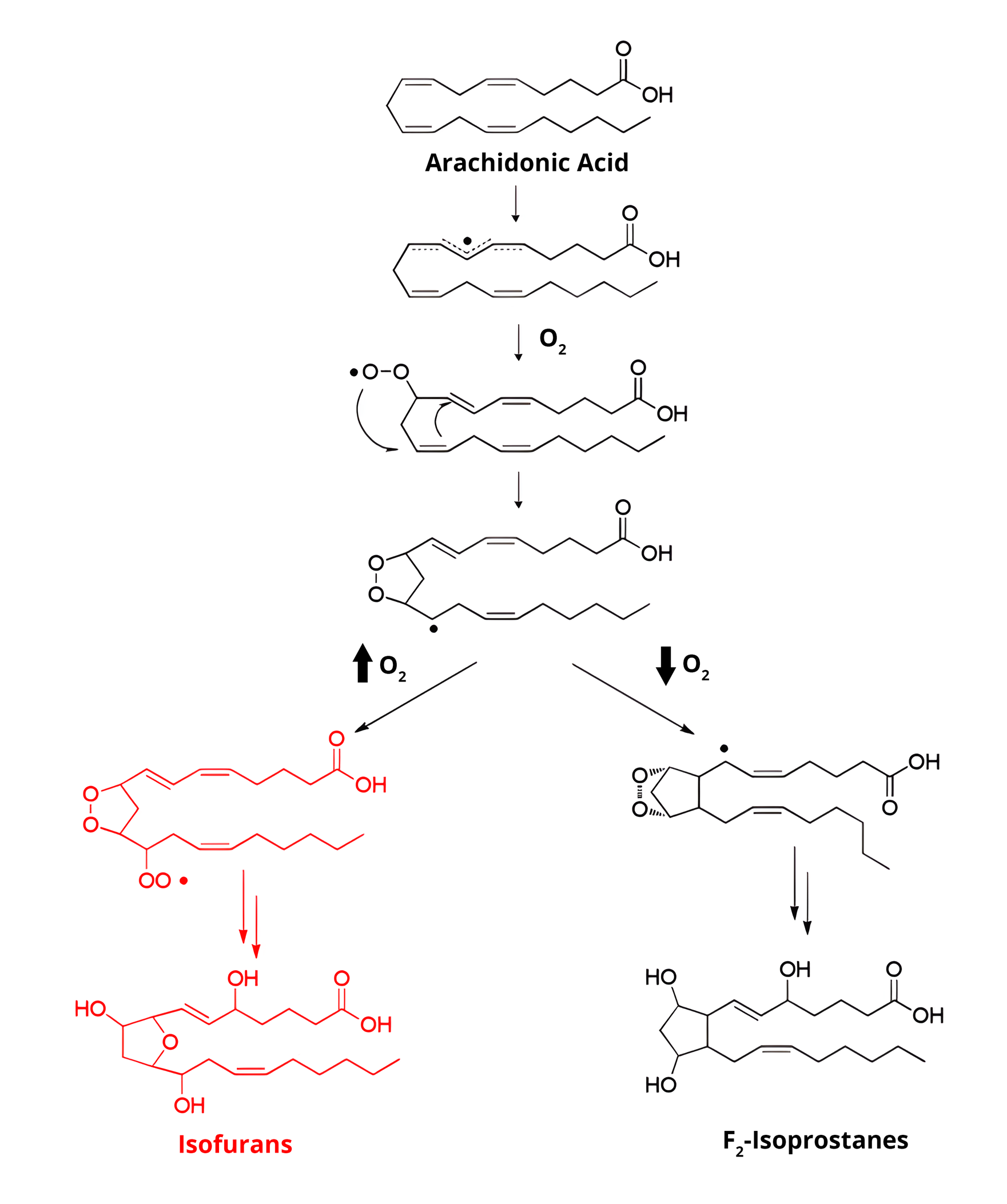
Mechanism for formation of Isofuran and F2-Isoprostane from Arachidonic Acid precursor; as per oxygen concentration available.

Isofurans are a family of organic compounds termed nonclassic eicosanoids. They arise nonenzymatically by free radical peroxidation of arachidonic acid. The isofurans are similar to the isoprostanes and are formed under similar conditions, but contain a substituted tetrahydrofuran ring. The concentration of oxygen affects this process; at elevated oxygen concentrations, the formation of isofurans is favored whereas the formation of isoprostanes is disfavored.

== Angiogenic potential ==
Isofurans have also been found to have pro-angiogenic potential. Studies analyzing the affects of isofurans on rat brain endothelial cells (RBECs) show that they induce the growth of new blood vessels through promotion of endothelial cell proliferation, migration and cellular protection. Additionally, they have been found to play a role in the regulation of other pro-angiogenic signaling factors in RBECs.

== Role in blood storage and transfusion ==
Isofurans, alongside F2-isoprostanes, accumulate in stored red blood cells (RBCs) as products of lipid peroxidation. These bioactive lipids impair platelet (PLT) function in vitro and may contribute to adverse transfusion outcomes. Elevated levels of these compounds, along with cell-free hemoglobin—which inhibits platelet spreading and may interfere with wound healing and angiogenic processes—have been proposed as biomarkers for evaluating the quality of blood components. Post-storage washing of RBCs reduces the concentration of these mediators and may help lower the risk of transfusion-related complications.
