= Sulfur amino acid =

Sulfur amino acid, sulfur-containing amino acid, or SAA is an amino acid containing element sulfur.

Common sulfur amino acids include:

- Proteinogenic amino acids
  - Cysteine (Cys, C)
  - Methionine (Met or M), an essential amino acid in humans
- Metabolic products:
  - Cystine, a cysteine dimer, and an oxidation product of cysteine
  - Homocysteine (Hcy)
  - Homocystine, a homocysteine dimer, and an oxidation product of homocysteine
  - Cystathionine, produced by the transsulfuration pathway
  - S-Adenosyl methionine (SAM, SAMe, SAM-e, AdoMet), a common cofactor in methyltransferases
  - S-Adenosyl homocysteine (SAH), a side product of biomethylation by methyltransferases

== See also ==
- Homologous series, for homo- prefix
- Cysteine metabolism
- Taurine, sulfur-containing acidic compound with amino group, but not classified as amino acid. The compound is a sulfonic acid, and amino acid definition only allows carboxylic acids.
- List of MeSH codes (D02) § MeSH D02.886.030 – amino acids, sulfur
- List of MeSH codes (D12.125) § MeSH D12.125.166 – amino acids, sulfur
