= Neuroprostanes =

The neuroprostanes are prostaglandin-like compounds formed in vivo from the free radical-catalyzed peroxidation of essential fatty acids (primarily docosahexaenoic acid) without the direct action of cyclooxygenase (COX) enzymes. The result is the formation of isoprostane-like compounds F4-, D4-, E4-, A4-, and J4-neuroprostanes which have been shown to be produced in vivo. These oxygenated essential fatty acids possess potent biological activity as anti-inflammatory mediators inhibiting the response of human macrophages that augment the perception of pain.

== See also ==
- Isoprostanes
- Prostaglandin
