= Endothelial NOS =

Protein and coding gene in humans

NOS3
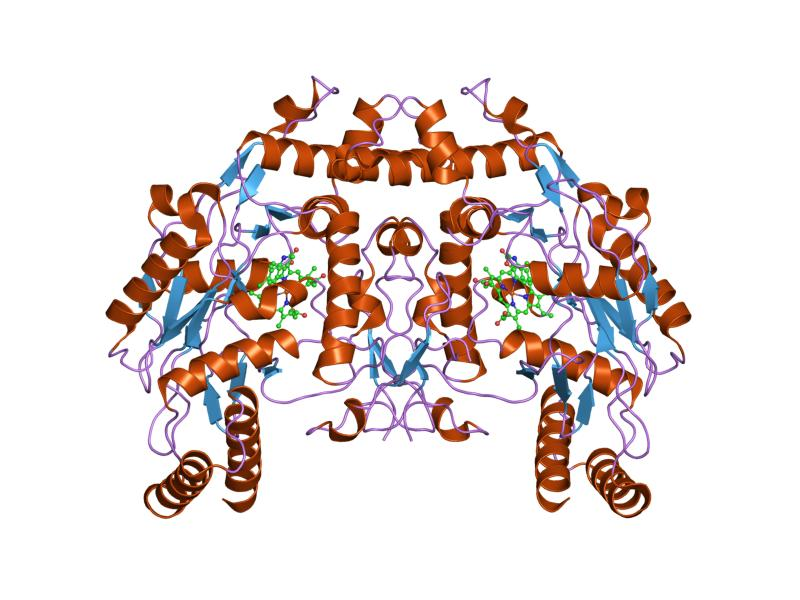

Identifiers
- Aliases: NOS3, ECNOS, eNOS, nitric oxide synthase 3
- External IDs: OMIM: 163729; MGI: 97362; GeneCards: NOS3
Available structures
| PDB | Ortholog search: PDBe RCSB |
| PDB | List of PDB id codes 1M9J, 1M9K, 1M9M, 1M9Q, 1M9R, 1NIW, 2LL7, 3EAH, 3NOS, 2MG5, 4D1O, 4D1P |
Enzyme activity
| EC # | BRENDA | ExPASy | KEGG | MetaCyc |
|---|---|---|---|---|
| 1.14.13.39 | ↗ | ↗ | ↗ | ↗ |

Gene location (Human)
| Chr. | Chromosome 7 (human) |
| Band | 7q36.1 | Start | 150,991,017 bp |
| Band | 7q36.1 | End | 151,014,588 bp |

Gene location (Mouse)
| Chr. | Chromosome 5 (mouse) |
| Band | 5 A3|5 11.32 cM | Start | 24,569,808 bp |
| Band | 5 A3|5 11.32 cM | End | 24,589,472 bp |
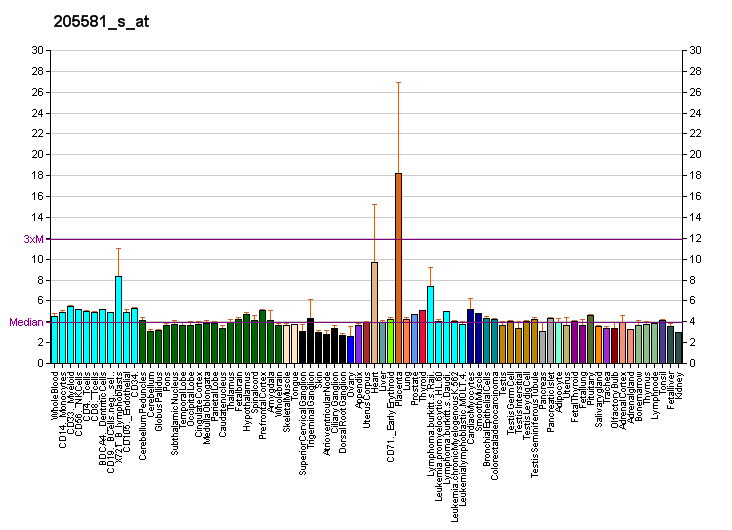
RNA expression pattern
| Bgee | Human / Mouse (ortholog); Top expressed in: spleen; apex of heart; right auricle of heart; upper lobe of left lung; left uterine tube; left ventricle; body of uterus; right lobe of thyroid gland; left coronary artery; right coronary artery / Top expressed in: right ventricle; subcutaneous adipose tissue; tunica adventitia of aorta; tunica media of zone of aorta; white adipose tissue; endocardial cushion; brown adipose tissue; digastric muscle; interventricular septum; gastrula; More reference expression data |
| BioGPS | More reference expression data |
Gene ontology
| Molecular function | FMN binding; actin monomer binding; flavin adenine dinucleotide binding; scaffold protein binding; arginine binding; tetrahydrobiopterin binding; metal ion binding; calmodulin binding; protein binding; heme binding; NADP binding; oxidoreductase activity; cadmium ion binding; nitric-oxide synthase activity; NADPH-hemoprotein reductase activity |
| Cellular component | cytoplasm; endocytic vesicle membrane; cytosol; Golgi apparatus; membrane; Golgi membrane; plasma membrane; caveola; cytoskeleton; nucleus; vesicle membrane |
| Biological process | negative regulation of muscle hyperplasia; ovulation from ovarian follicle; positive regulation of guanylate cyclase activity; nitric oxide biosynthetic process; regulation of systemic arterial blood pressure by endothelin; regulation of sodium ion transport; lung development; negative regulation of blood pressure; removal of superoxide radicals; regulation of nitric-oxide synthase activity; mitochondrion organization; response to heat; in utero embryonic development; negative regulation of hydrolase activity; cell redox homeostasis; arginine catabolic process; response to fluid shear stress; regulation of blood pressure; negative regulation of platelet activation; blood vessel remodeling; negative regulation of extrinsic apoptotic signaling pathway via death domain receptors; angiogenesis; negative regulation of potassium ion transport; nitric oxide mediated signal transduction; negative regulation of calcium ion transport; smooth muscle hyperplasia; regulation of the force of heart contraction by chemical signal; endothelial cell migration; lipopolysaccharide-mediated signaling pathway; negative regulation of cell population proliferation; vasodilation; positive regulation of blood vessel endothelial cell migration; positive regulation of angiogenesis; aortic valve morphogenesis; pulmonary valve morphogenesis; endocardial cushion morphogenesis; positive regulation of gene expression; homeostasis of number of cells within a tissue; ventricular septum morphogenesis; negative regulation of biomineral tissue development; response to hormone; response to lipopolysaccharide; regulation of nervous system process; positive regulation of Notch signaling pathway |
Sources:Amigo / QuickGO
Orthologs
| Databases | NCBI: entry; OMA: entry |
| Species | Human | Mouse |
| Entrez | 4846 | 18127 |
| Ensembl | ENSG00000164867 | ENSMUSG00000028978 |
| UniProt | P29474 | P70313 |
| RefSeq (mRNA) | NM_000603; NM_001160109; NM_001160110; NM_001160111 | NM_008713 |
| RefSeq (protein) | NP_000594; NP_001153581; NP_001153582; NP_001153583 | NP_032739 |
| Location (UCSC) | Chr 7: 150.99 – 151.01 Mb | Chr 5: 24.57 – 24.59 Mb |
| PubMed search |
- Wikidata
| View/Edit Human | View/Edit Mouse |

Endothelial NOS (eNOS), also known as nitric oxide synthase 3 (NOS3) or constitutive NOS (cNOS), is an enzyme that in humans is encoded by the NOS3 gene located in the 7q35-7q36 region of chromosome 7. This enzyme is one of three isoforms that synthesize nitric oxide (NO), a small gaseous and lipophilic molecule that participates in several biological processes. The other isoforms include neuronal nitric oxide synthase (nNOS), which is constitutively expressed in specific neurons of the brain and inducible nitric oxide synthase (iNOS), whose expression is typically induced in inflammatory diseases. eNOS is primarily responsible for the generation of NO in the vascular endothelium, a monolayer of flat cells lining the interior surface of blood vessels, at the interface between circulating blood in the lumen and the remainder of the vessel wall. NO produced by eNOS in the vascular endothelium plays crucial roles in regulating vascular tone, cellular proliferation, leukocyte adhesion, and platelet aggregation. Therefore, a functional eNOS is essential for a healthy cardiovascular system.

== Structure and catalytic activities ==
eNOS is a dimer containing two identical monomers of 140 kD constituted by a reductase domain, which displays binding sites for nicotinamide adenine dinucleotide phosphate (NADPH), flavin mononucleotide (FMN), and flavin adenine dinucleotide (FAD), and an oxidase domain, which displays binding sites for heme group, zinc, the cofactor tetrahydrobiopterin (BH4), and the substrate L-arginine. The reductase domain is linked to the oxidase domain by a calmodulin-binding sequence. In the vascular endothelium, NO is synthesized by eNOS from L-arginine and molecular oxygen, which binds to the heme group of eNOS, is reduced and finally incorporated into L- arginine to form NO and L-citrulline. The binding of the cofactor BH4 is essential for eNOS to efficiently generate NO. In the absence of this cofactor, eNOS shifts from a dimeric to a monomeric form, thus becoming uncoupled. In this conformation, instead of synthesizing NO, eNOS produces superoxide anion, a highly reactive free radical with deleterious consequences to the cardiovascular system.

== Function ==
eNOS has a protective function in the cardiovascular system, which is attributed to NO production. Regulation of the vascular tone is one of the best known roles of NO in the cardiovascular system. Once produced in endothelial cells, NO diffuses across the vascular smooth muscle cell membranes and activates the enzyme soluble guanylate cyclase (sGC), which catalyzes the conversion of guanosine triphosphate into cyclic guanosine monophosphate (cGMP). cGMP, in turn, activates protein kinase G (PKG), which promotes multiple phosphorylation of cellular targets lowering cellular Ca^{2+} concentrations and promoting vascular relaxation. NO exerts antiproliferative effects by cGMP-dependent inhibiting Ca^{2+} influx or by directly inhibiting the activity of arginase and ornithine decarboxylase, decreasing the generation of polyamides required for DNA synthesis. NO also has antithrombotic effects that result of its diffusion across platelet membrane and sGC activation, resulting in inhibition of platelet aggregation. Moreover, NO affects leukocyte adhesion to the vascular endothelium by inhibiting the nuclear factor kappa B (NF-κB), which induces vascular endothelial expression of chemokines and adhesion molecules. In addition to these functions, NO produced by eNOS has antioxidant properties as it reduces superoxide anion formation as a result of NO-induced increases in the expression of superoxide dismutase, an antioxidant enzyme that catalyzes the conversion of superoxide anion to hydrogen peroxide. Furthermore, part of antioxidants properties of NO is attributable to up-regulation of heme-oxygenase-I and ferritin expression, which reduce superoxide anion concentrations in blood vessels.

== Regulation ==
eNOS expression and activity are carefully controlled by multiple interconnected mechanisms of regulation present at the transcriptional, posttranscriptional, and posttranslational levels. Binding of transcription factors such as Sp1, Sp3, Ets-1, Elf-1, and YY1 to the NOS3 promoter and DNA methylation represents an important mechanism of transcriptional regulation. Posttranscriptionally, eNOS is regulated by modifications of the primary transcript, mRNA stability, subcellular localization, and nucleocytoplasmatic transport. Posttranslational modifications of eNOS include fatty acid acylation, protein-protein interactions, substrate, and co-factor availability, and degree of phosphorylation. Importantly, eNOS is attached by myristoylation and palmitoylation to caveolae, a pocket-like invagination on the membrane rich in cholesterol and sphingolipids. With the binding of eNOS to caveolae, the enzyme is inactivated due to the strong and direct interaction of eNOS with caveolin-1. The binding of calcium-activated calmodulin to eNOS displaces caveolin-1 and activates eNOS. However, more recent studies have questioned the hypothesis that caveolin-1 directly binds to eNOS, as the region of the caveolin-1 protein proposed to bind to eNOS may be inaccessible due to its location in the plasma membrane. As a result, the specifics of how caveolin-1 interacts with eNOS to regulate eNOS activity are still unclear. Moreover, eNOS activation is dynamically regulated by multiple phosphorylation sites at tyrosine, serine, and threonine residues.

== Clinical significance ==
Impaired NO production is involved in the pathogenesis of several diseases such as hypertension, preeclampsia, diabetes mellitus, obesity, erectile dysfunction, and migraine. In this regard, a large number of studies showed that polymorphisms in NOS3 gene affect the susceptibility to these diseases. Although NOS3 is a highly polymorphic gene, three genetic polymorphisms in this gene have been widely studied: the single nucleotide polymorphisms (SNPs) g.-786T>C (where "g." denotes genomic change which results in a Glu298Asp change in the coded protein), located in NOS3 promoter and in exon 7, respectively, and the variable number of tandem repeats (VNTR) characterized by 27 bp repeat in intron 4. The C allele for the g.-786T>C polymorphism, which results in reduced eNOS expression and NO production, was associated with increased risk for hypertension, preeclampsia, diabetic nephropathy, and retinopathy, migraine, and erectile dysfunction. The presence of 'Asp' allele for the Glu298Asp polymorphism reduces eNOS activity, and was associated with higher susceptibility to hypertension, preeclampsia, diabetes mellitus, migraine, and erectile dysfunction. The VNTR in intron 4 affects eNOS expression, and the susceptibility to hypertension, preeclampsia, obesity, and diabetes mellitus. Growing evidence supports the association of diseases with NOS3 haplotypes (combination of alleles in close proximity, within a DNA block). This approach may be more informative than the analysis of genetic polymorphisms one by one. Haplotypes including the SNPs g.-786T>C and Glu298Asp and the VNTR in intron 4 affected the susceptibility to hypertension, preeclampsia, and hypertension in diabetic subjects. NOS3 variants may also affect the responses to drugs that affect NO signaling, such as statins, angiotensin-converting enzyme inhibitors (ACEi) and phosphodiesterase type 5 (PDE-5) inhibitors (PDE5i). Statin treatment was more effective in increasing NO bioavailability in subjects carrying the CC genotype for the g.-786T>C polymorphism than in TT carriers. Hypertensive patients carrying the TC/CC genotypes and the C allele for the g.-786T>C polymorphism showed better antihypertensive responses to ACEi enalapril. Likewise, patients with erectile dysfunction carrying the C allele for g.-786T>C polymorphism showed better responses to PDE-5 inhibitor sildenafil. Together, these studies suggest that statins, ACEi and PDE-5 inhibitors may restore an impaired NO production in subjects carrying the variant allele/genotype for g.-786T>C NOS3 polymorphism, thus attenuating the cardiovascular risk. In addition to analysis of genetic polymorphisms individually, haplotypes including the SNPs g.-786T>C and Glu298Asp and the VNTR in intron 4 were shown to affect the responses to sildenafil in patients with erectile dysfunction.
