= Nitroarginine =

Nω-Nitro-l-arginine
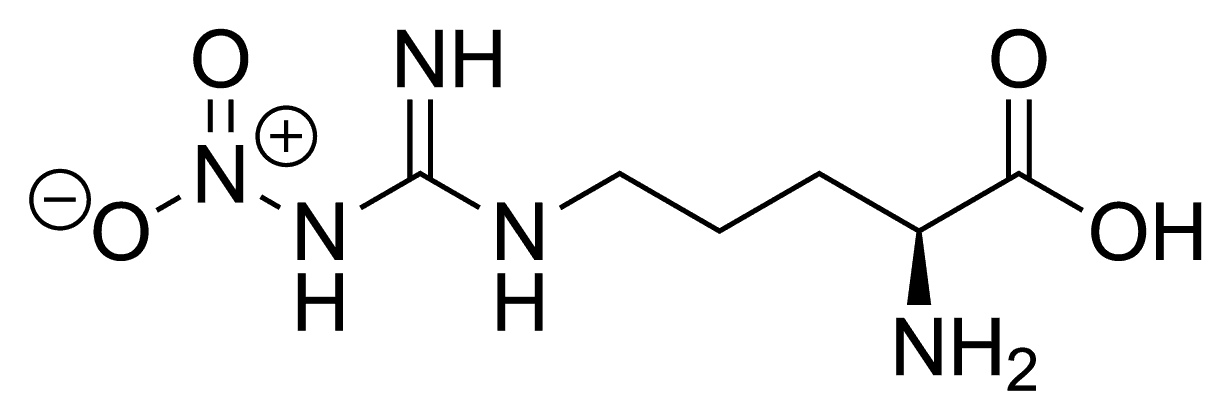

Names
- IUPAC name (2S)-2-Amino-5-[[amino(nitramido)methylidene]amino]pentanoic acid
- Other names N5-(nitroamidino)-l-Ornithine; (+)-NG-Nitroarginine; NG-nitro-l-Arginine, l-NG-Nitroarginine; L-NNA; L-NOARG; NG-Nitro-l-arginine; NG-Nitroarginine; NOLA; NSC 53662; Nitro-l-arginine; Nω-Nitro-l-arginine; Nω-Nitro-l-arginine; ω-Nitro-l-arginine; ω-Nitroarginine

Identifiers
CAS Number	2149-70-4
3D model (JSmol)	Interactive image
ChEBI	CHEBI:27960
ChEMBL	ChEMBL227744
ChemSpider	389023
DrugBank	DB04223
ECHA InfoCard	100.016.745
EC Number	218-418-9
IUPHAR/BPS	8759
KEGG	C03417
PubChem CID	440005
UNII	7O8V7H6P2J
CompTox Dashboard (EPA)	DTXSID2042696
- InChI: InChI=1S/C6H13N5O4/c7-4(5(12)13)2-1-3-9-6(8)10-11(14)15/h4H,1-3,7H2,(H,12,13)(H3,8,9,10)/t4-/m0/s1 Key: MRAUNPAHJZDYCK-BYPYZUCNSA-N
- SMILES: OC([C@@H](N)CCCNC(N[N+]([O-])=O)=N)=O

Properties
Chemical formula	C_{6}H_{13}N_{5}O_{4}
Molar mass	219.201 g·mol^{−1}
- Except where otherwise noted, data are given for materials in their standard state (at 25 °C [77 °F], 100 kPa). verify (what is ?) Infobox references

Nitroarginine, or N^{ω}-nitro-l-arginine, also known as L-NOARG, is a nitro derivative of the amino acid arginine. It is an inhibitor of nitric oxide synthase and hence a vasoconstrictor. As such, it finds widespread use as a biochemical tool in the study of nitric oxide and its biological effects.

Nitroarginine has been used in research studying coronary constriction, and it was found that, in the presence of midazolam vasodilatation was unaffected by nitroarginine. Due to the presence of all three isoforms of nitric oxide synthase in striatal tissue in the forebrain, research has also been conducted on how its inhibition might affect monoamine transport and dopamine half-life in the striatal extracellular space.
