= Dimyristoylphosphatidylcholine =

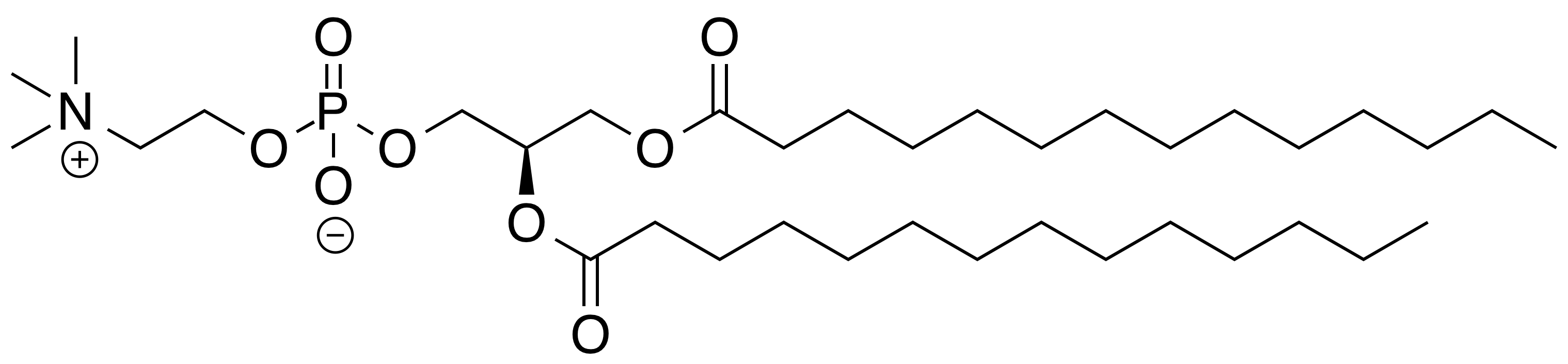

Names
- Systematic IUPAC name (2R)-2,3-Bis(tetradecanoyloxy)propyl 2-(trimethylazaniumyl)ethyl phosphate
- Other names 1,2-dimyristoylphosphatidylcholine, 1,2-dimyristoyl-sn-glycero-3-phosphocholine, 1,2-ditetradecanoyl-sn-glycero-3-phosphocholine, DMPC, 14:0 PC

Identifiers
CAS Number	18194-24-6
3D model (JSmol)	Interactive image
ChEBI	CHEBI:45240
ChEMBL	ChEMBL1235508
ChemSpider	4573168
ECHA InfoCard	100.038.245
EC Number	242-085-9
PubChem CID	5459377
UNII	52QK2NZ2T0
CompTox Dashboard (EPA)	DTXSID00860227
- InChI: InChI=1S/C36H72NO8P/c1-6-8-10-12-14-16-18-20-22-24-26-28-35(38)42-32-34(33-44-46(40,41)43-31-30-37(3,4)5)45-36(39)29-27-25-23-21-19-17-15-13-11-9-7-2/h34H,6-33H2,1-5H3/t34-/m1/s1 Key: CITHEXJVPOWHKC-UUWRZZSWSA-N
- SMILES: CCCCCCCCCCCCCC(=O)OC[C@H](COP(=O)([O-])OCC[N+](C)(C)C)OC(=O)CCCCCCCCCCCCC

Properties
Chemical formula	C_{36}H_{72}NO_{8}P
Molar mass	677.945 g·mol^{−1}
- Except where otherwise noted, data are given for materials in their standard state (at 25 °C [77 °F], 100 kPa). Infobox references

Dimyristoylphosphatidylcholine is a phosphatidylcholine, a kind of phospholipid. Along with other lipids, it can be used to prepare liposomes.
