= Aminoisobutyric acid =

Aminoisobutyric acid may refer to either of two isomeric chemical compounds:

- 2-Aminoisobutyric acid (AIB)
- 3-Aminoisobutyric acid
