= Horst-Schmidt-Kliniken =

Coordinates: 50°03′57.5″N 08°11′29.3″E

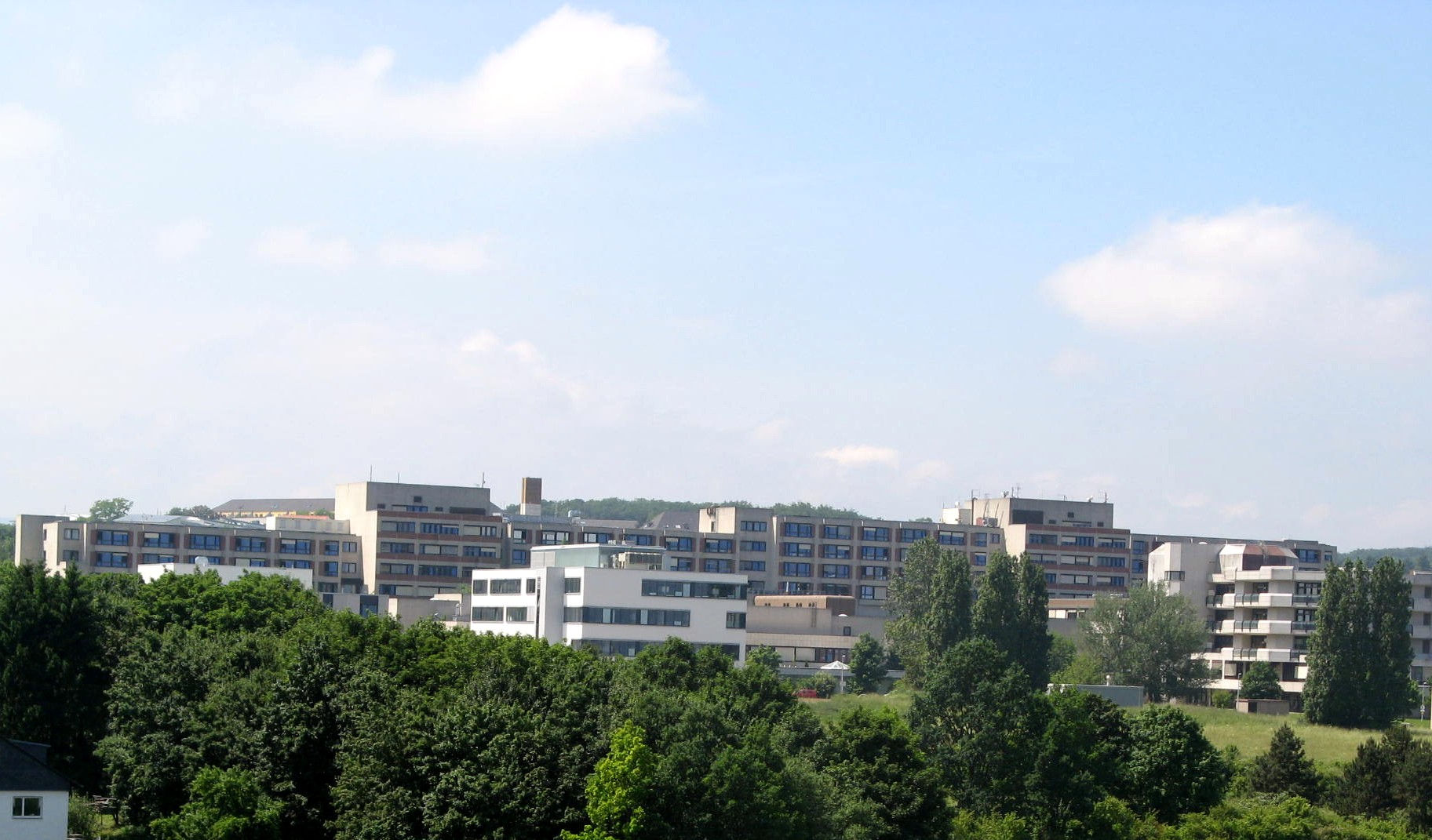

The Horst-Schmidt-Kliniken in the district of Dotzheim is the largest hospital complex in Wiesbaden founding in 1879, owing to its affiliated institutions and 1,027 beds. In 1982 the new buildings were relocated to the present location.
