= Dihydroxyphenylalanine =

Dihydroxyphenylalanine may refer to either of two chemical compounds:

- D-DOPA (R), 3,4-dihydroxyphenylalanine
- L-DOPA (S), 3,4-dihydroxyphenylalanine, a precursor of a neurotransmitter
