= Carbocisteine =

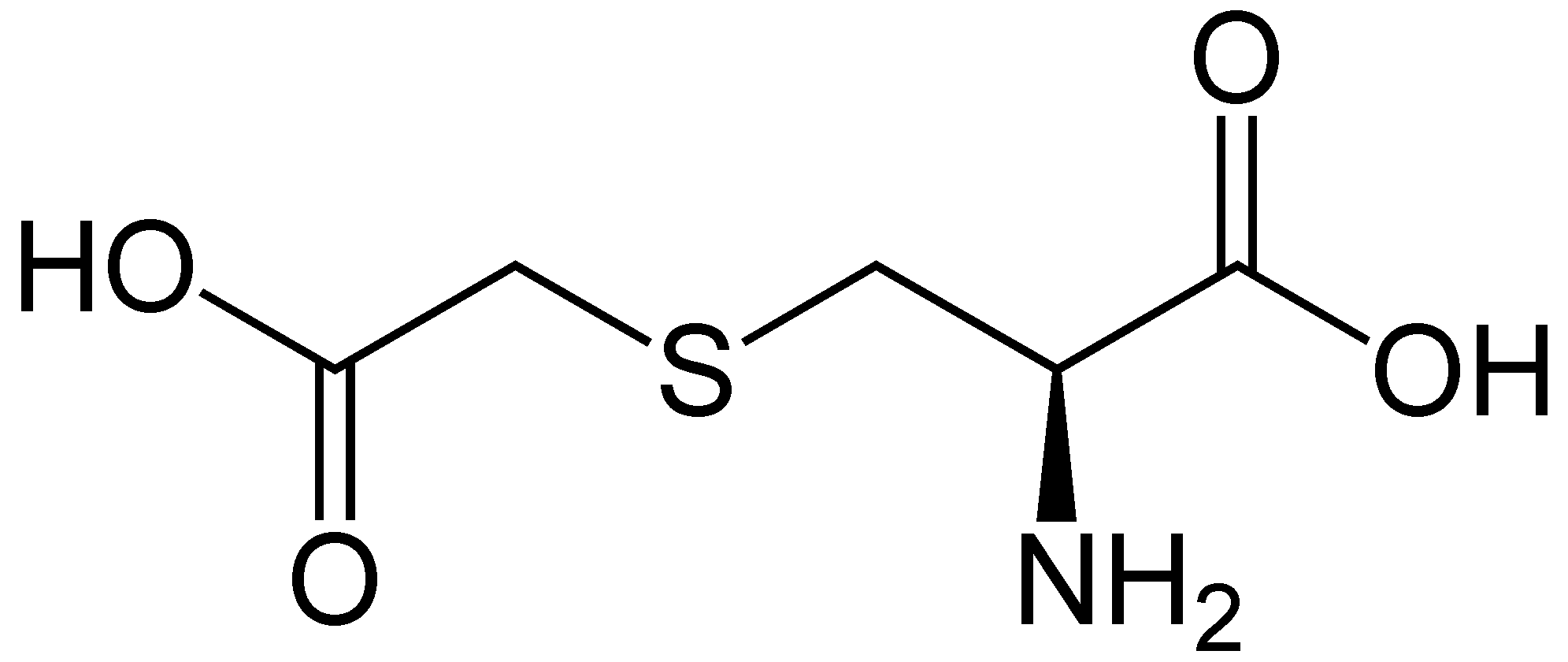

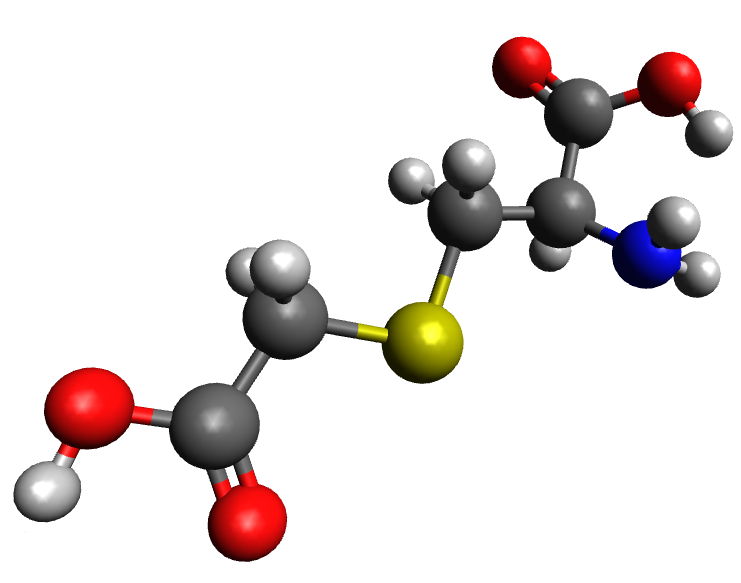

Names
- IUPAC name (R)-2-Amino-3-(carboxymethylsulfanyl)propanoic acid
- Preferred IUPAC name (2R)-2-amino-3-[(carboxymethyl)sulfanyl]propanoic acid
- Other names S-Carboxymethyl-L-cysteine; Actithiol, Lisomucil, Muciclar, Mucodyne, Mucolex, Rhinathiol, Transbronchin

Identifiers
| CAS Number | 638-23-3; 25390-17-4 (DL) |
| 3D model (JSmol) | Interactive image; Interactive image |
| ChEBI | CHEBI:16163 |
| ChEMBL | ChEMBL396416 |
| ChemSpider | 168055 |
| DrugBank | DB04339 |
| ECHA InfoCard | 100.010.298 |
| KEGG | D06393; D00175 |
| PubChem CID | 193653 |
| UNII | 740J2QX53R; 4252LRM78Q (DL) |
| CompTox Dashboard (EPA) | DTXSID30110060 |
- InChI: InChI=1S/C5H9NO4S/c6-3(5(9)10)1-11-2-4(7)8/h3H,1-2,6H2,(H,7,8)(H,9,10)/t3-/m0/s1 Key: GBFLZEXEOZUWRN-VKHMYHEASA-N; InChI=1/C5H9NO4S/c6-3(5(9)10)1-11-2-4(7)8/h3H,1-2,6H2,(H,7,8)(H,9,10) Key: GBFLZEXEOZUWRN-UHFFFAOYAN; InChI=1/C5H9NO4S/c6-3(5(9)10)1-11-2-4(7)8/h3H,1-2,6H2,(H,7,8)(H,9,10)/t3-/m0/s1 Key: GBFLZEXEOZUWRN-VKHMYHEABX
- SMILES: O=C(O)C(N)CSCC(=O)O; O=C(O)[C@@H](N)CSCC(=O)O

Properties
| Chemical formula | C_{5}H_{9}NO_{4}S |
| Molar mass | 179.19 g·mol^{−1} |
| Appearance | Colorless solid |
| Melting point | 204 to 207 °C (399 to 405 °F; 477 to 480 K) |

Pharmacology
| ATC code | R05CB03 (WHO) |
- Except where otherwise noted, data are given for materials in their standard state (at 25 °C [77 °F], 100 kPa). verify (what is ?) Infobox references

Carbocisteine, also called carbocysteine, is a mucolytic that reduces the viscosity of sputum and so can be used to help relieve the symptoms of chronic obstructive pulmonary disorder (COPD) and bronchiectasis by allowing the affected person to bring up sputum more easily. Carbocisteine should not be used with antitussives (cough suppressants) or medicines that dry up bronchial secretions.

It was first described in 1951 and came into medical use in 1960. Carbocisteine is produced by the alkylation of cysteine with chloroacetic acid.

== See also ==
- Acetylcysteine
