= Slow-reacting substance of anaphylaxis =

LTC_{4}

LTD_{4}

LTE_{4}

The slow-reacting substance of anaphylaxis or SRS-A is a mixture of the leukotrienes LTC4, LTD4 and LTE4. Mast cells secrete it during the anaphylactic reaction, inducing inflammation. It can be found in basophils.

It induces prolonged, slow contraction of smooth muscle and has a major bronchoconstrictor role in asthma. Compared to histamine, it is approximately 1000 times more potent and has a slower onset but longer duration of action.
