= Adosterol =

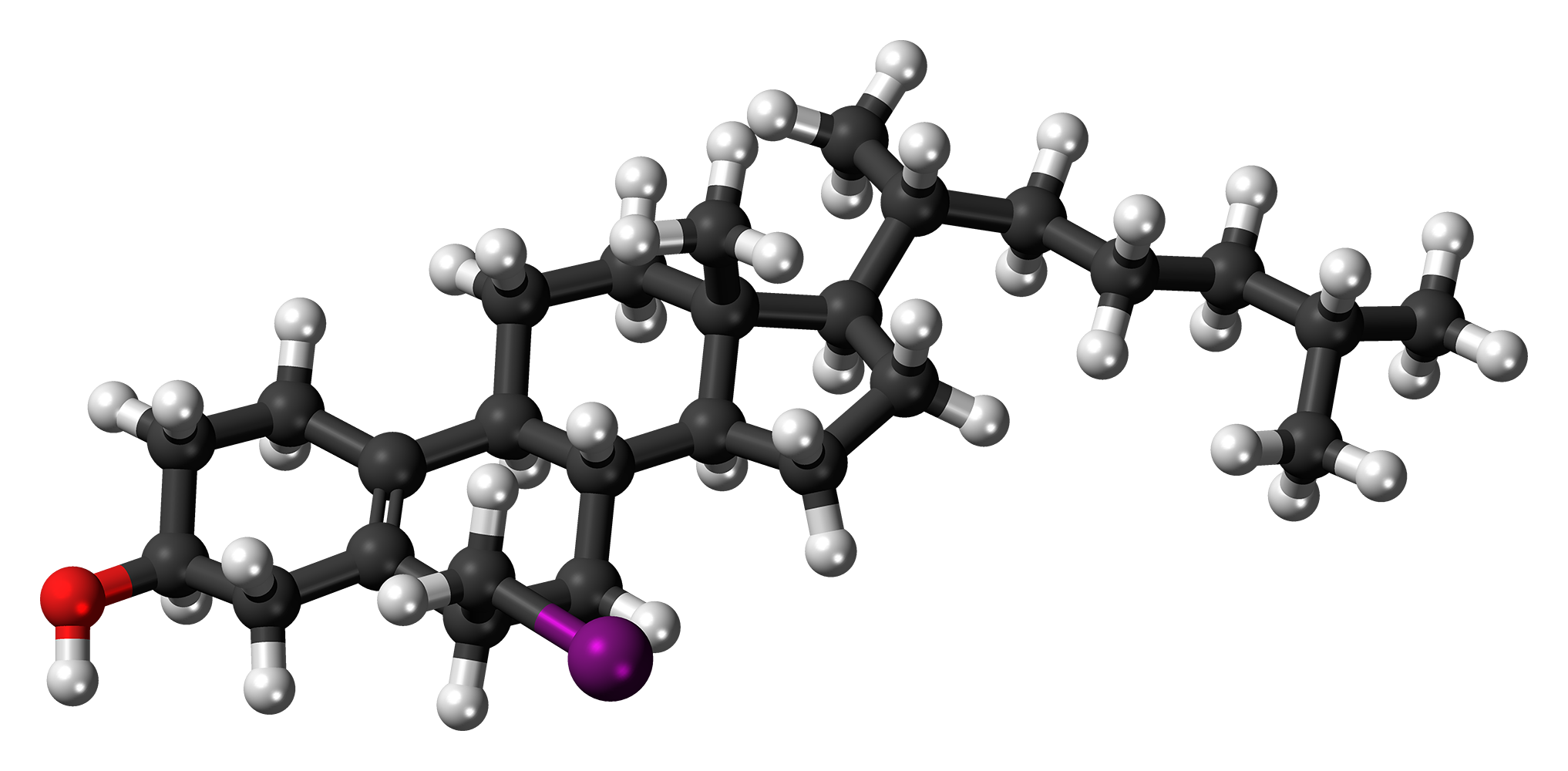

Names
- IUPAC name 6β-(Iodomethyl)-19-norcholest-5(10)-en-3β-ol
- Systematic IUPAC name (1R,3aS,3bS,5R,7S,9bS,11aR)-5-(Iodomethyl)-11a-methyl-1-[(2R)-6-methylheptan-2-yl]-2,3,3a,3b,4,5,6,7,8,9,9b,10,11,11a-tetradecahydro-1H-cyclopenta[a]phenanthren-7-ol

Identifiers
CAS Number	55623-03-5
3D model (JSmol)	Interactive image; Interactive image
ChemSpider	37858
MeSH	Adosterol
PubChem CID	41491
UNII	H2M0WI52MC
CompTox Dashboard (EPA)	DTXSID40897512
- InChI: InChI=1S/C27H45IO/c1-17(2)6-5-7-18(3)25-10-11-26-24-14-19(16-28)23-15-20(29)8-9-21(23)22(24)12-13-27(25,26)4/h17-20,22,24-26,29H,5-16H2,1-4H3/t18?,19-,20-,22+,24+,25+,26-,27+/m0/s1 Key: QJHZPCLORSPENH-WJXGYAGSSA-N; InChI=1/C27H45IO/c1-17(2)6-5-7-18(3)25-10-11-26-24-14-19(16-28)23-15-20(29)8-9-21(23)22(24)12-13-27(25,26)4/h17-20,22,24-26,29H,5-16H2,1-4H3/t18?,19-,20-,22+,24+,25+,26-,27+/m0/s1 Key: QJHZPCLORSPENH-WJXGYAGSBZ
- SMILES: IC[C@H]2\C4=C(/[C@H]1CC[C@]3([C@H]([C@@H]1C2)CC[C@@H]3C(C)CCCC(C)C)C)CC[C@H](O)C4; CC(C)CCCC(C)[C@H]1CC[C@H]2[C@@H]3C[C@@H](CI)C4=C(CC[C@H](O)C4)[C@H]3CC[C@]12C

Properties
Chemical formula	C_{27}H_{45}IO
Molar mass	512.55 g/mol
- Except where otherwise noted, data are given for materials in their standard state (at 25 °C [77 °F], 100 kPa). verify (what is ?) Infobox references

Adosterol is an iodine-containing sterol.
