= Isoprostane =

Class of chemical compounds

The isoprostanes are prostaglandin-like compounds formed in vivo from the free radical-catalyzed peroxidation of essential fatty acids (primarily arachidonic acid) without the direct action of cyclooxygenase (COX) enzymes. These nonclassical eicosanoids possess potent biological activity as inflammatory mediators that augment the perception of pain. These compounds are accurate markers of lipid peroxidation in both animal and human models of oxidative stress.

Elevated levels of isoprostanes are suspected of contributing to increased risk of heart attack in patients taking Coxibs. Isoprostanes and their metabolites have also been shown to be elevated in the urine of cigarette smokers, and have been suggested as biomarkers of oxidative stress in smokers.

== Abundance ==
Polyunsaturated fatty acids other than arachidonic acid are also vulnerable to reactive oxygen species and produce isoprostanes. For example, in addition to the four classes of F2-isoprostanes that can arise from arachidonic acid, peroxidation of eicosapentaenoic acid (EPA) is predicted to lead to the generation of six classes of F3 isoprostanes, α-linolenic and γ-linolenic acids to two classes of E1- and F1-isoprostanes, and docosahexaenoic acid to eight classes of D4-isoprostanes and eight classes of E4-isoprostanes. Each of the classes comprise up to eight racemic isomers, leading to an astounding number of isoprostane molecules.

== History ==
The isoprostanes were reported in 1990 by L. Jackson Roberts and Jason D. Morrow in the Division of Clinical Pharmacology at Vanderbilt University.

== See also ==
- Neuroprostanes
- Prostaglandin
- Isofurans
