= Homocystine =

Names
- IUPAC name (2S,2′S)-4,4'-Disulfanediylbis(2-aminobutanoic acid)
- Other names L-Homocystine; L-4,4′-Dithiobis(2-aminobutanoic acid)

Identifiers
CAS Number	626-72-2
3D model (JSmol)	Interactive image
ChEBI	CHEBI:141698
ChemSpider	388664
ECHA InfoCard	100.009.966
EC Number	210-962-5
KEGG	C01817
PubChem CID	439579
UNII	804AS222UE
CompTox Dashboard (EPA)	DTXSID001019905
- InChI: InChI=1S/C8H16N2O4S2/c9-5(7(11)12)1-3-15-16-4-2-6(10)8(13)14/h5-6H,1-4,9-10H2,(H,11,12)(H,13,14)/t5-,6-/m0/s1 Key: ZTVZLYBCZNMWCF-WDSKDSINSA-N
- SMILES: C(CSSCC[C@@H](C(=O)O)N)[C@@H](C(=O)O)N

Properties
Chemical formula	C_{8}H_{16}N_{2}O_{4}S_{2}
Molar mass	268.35 g·mol^{−1}
Appearance	colorless solid
Melting point	281–284 °C (538–543 °F; 554–557 K)
- Except where otherwise noted, data are given for materials in their standard state (at 25 °C [77 °F], 100 kPa). Infobox references

Homocystine is the organosulfur compound with the formula (HO_{2}CCH(NH_{2})CH_{2}CH_{2}S)_{2}. It is disulfide derived from oxidation of homocysteine. Its relationship with homocysteine is analogous to the relationship between cystine and cysteine.
