= Nitric oxide synthase =

Class of enzymes

Nitric-oxide synthase (NADPH)
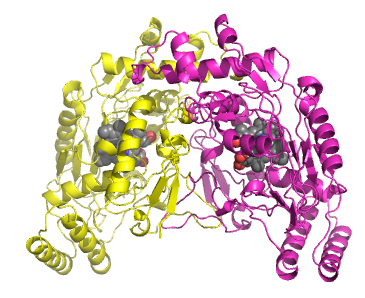
- Human inducible nitric oxide synthase. PDB 1nsi

Identifiers
- EC no.: 1.14.13.39
- CAS no.: 125978-95-2

Databases
- BRENDA: enzyme data
- ExPASy: NiceZyme view
- KEGG: enzyme entry
- MetaCyc: metabolic pathway
- Rhea: reactions
- PDB structures: RCSB PDB PDBe PDBsum
- Gene Ontology: AmiGO / QuickGO
Search
- PMC: articles
- PubMed: articles
- NCBI: proteins

Nitric oxide synthase, oxygenase domain
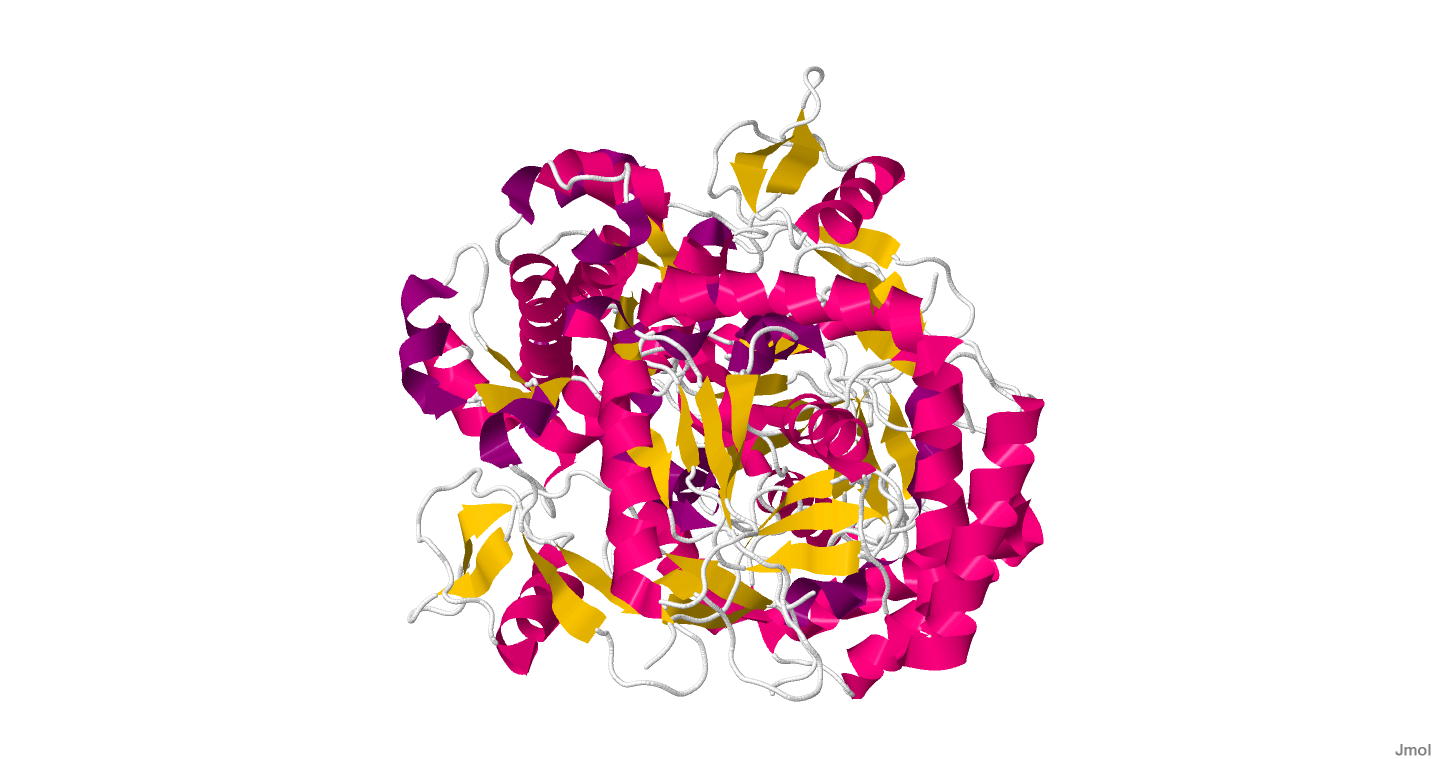
- Structure of endothelial nitric oxide synthase heme domain.

Identifiers
- Symbol: NO_synthase
- Pfam: PF02898
- InterPro: IPR004030
- SCOP2: 1nos / SCOPe / SUPFAM
Available protein structures:
- PDB: IPR004030 PF02898 (ECOD; PDBsum)
- AlphaFold: IPR004030; PF02898

Nitric oxide synthases (NOSs) are a family of enzymes catalyzing the production of nitric oxide (NO) from L-arginine. NO is an important cellular signaling molecule. It helps modulate vascular tone, insulin secretion, airway tone, and peristalsis, and is involved in angiogenesis and neural development. It may function as a retrograde neurotransmitter. Nitric oxide is mediated in mammals by the calcium-calmodulin controlled isoenzymes eNOS (endothelial NOS) and nNOS (neuronal NOS). The inducible isoform, iNOS, involved in immune response, binds calmodulin at physiologically relevant concentrations, and produces NO as an immune defense mechanism, as NO is a free radical with an unpaired electron. It is the proximate cause of septic shock and may function in autoimmune disease.

In the context of eukaryote biology, nitric oxide synthase refers to nitric-oxide synthase (NADPH) (EC 1.14.13.39), which catalyzes the reaction:

- 2 L-arginine + 3 NADPH + 3 H^{+} + 4 O_{2} $\rightleftharpoons$ 2 citrulline +2 nitric oxide + 4 H_{2}O + 3 NADP^{+}

NOS isoforms catalyze other leak and side reactions, such as superoxide production at the expense of NADPH. As such, this stoichiometry is not generally observed, and reflects the three electrons supplied per NO by NADPH.

Eukaryotic NOS isozymes are catalytically self-sufficient. The electron flow is: NADPH → FAD → FMN → heme → O_{2}. Tetrahydrobiopterin provides an additional electron during the catalytic cycle which is replaced during turnover. Zinc, though not a cofactor, also participates but as a structural element. NOSs are unique in that they use five cofactors and are the only known enzyme that binds flavin adenine dinucleotide (FAD), flavin mononucleotide (FMN), heme, tetrahydrobiopterin (BH_{4}) and calmodulin.

The EC number 1.14.13.39 specifically refers to synthases with linked oxygenase and reductase domains, i.e. "catalytically self-sufficient" NO synthases. This kind of synthase is found in eukaryotes and, through independent domain acquisition, Sorangium cellulosum. Most bacteria and archaea have a version that only has an oxidase domain and depend on a partner protein; these are categorized as EC 1.14.14.47 "nitric-oxide synthase (flavodoxin)". All these enzymes' oxygenase domains share a common ancestor (see "oxygenase domain" infobox).

== Species distribution ==
Arginine-derived NO synthesis has been identified in mammals, fish, birds, invertebrates, and bacteria.

Best studied are mammals, where three distinct genes encode NOS isozymes: neuronal (nNOS or NOS-1), cytokine-inducible (iNOS or NOS-2) and endothelial (eNOS or NOS-3). iNOS and nNOS are soluble and found predominantly in the cytosol, while eNOS is membrane associated. Evidence has been found for NO signaling in plants, but plant genomes are devoid of homologs to the superfamily which generates NO in other kingdoms.

== Chemical reaction ==

Nitric oxide synthases produce NO by catalysing a five-electron oxidation of a guanidino nitrogen of L-arginine (L-Arg). Oxidation of L-Arg to L-citrulline occurs via two successive monooxygenation reactions producing N^{ω}-hydroxy-L-arginine (NOHLA) as an intermediate. 2 mol of O_{2} and 1.5 mol of NADPH are consumed per mole of NO formed.

== Function ==
In mammals, the endothelial isoform is the primary signal generator in the control of vascular tone, insulin secretion, and airway tone, is involved in regulation of cardiac function and angiogenesis (growth of new blood vessels). NO produced by eNOS has been shown to be a vasodilator identical to the endothelium-derived relaxing factor produced in response to shear from increased blood flow in arteries. This dilates blood vessels by relaxing smooth muscle in their linings. eNOS is the primary controller of smooth muscle tone. NO activates guanylate cyclase, which induces smooth muscle relaxation by:

- Increased intracellular cGMP, which inhibits calcium entry into the cell, and decreases intracellular calcium concentrations
- Activation of K^{+} channels, which leads to hyperpolarization and relaxation
- Stimulates a cGMP-dependent protein kinase that activates myosin light chain phosphatase, the enzyme that dephosphorylates myosin light chains, which leads to smooth muscle relaxation.

eNOS plays a critical role in embryonic heart development and morphogenesis of coronary arteries and cardiac valves.

The neuronal isoform is involved in the development of nervous system. It functions as a retrograde neurotransmitter important in long term potentiation and hence is likely to be important in memory and learning. nNOS has many other physiological functions, including regulation of cardiac function and peristalsis and sexual arousal in males and females. An alternatively spliced form of nNOS is a major muscle protein that produces signals in response to calcium release from the SR. nNOS in the heart protects against cardiac arrhythmia induced by myocardial infarction.

The primary receiver for NO produced by eNOS and nNOS is soluble guanylate cyclase, but many secondary targets have been identified. S-nitrosylation appears to be an important mode of action.

The inducible isoform iNOS produces large amounts of NO as a defense mechanism. It is synthesized by many cell types in response to cytokines and is an important factor in the response of the body to attack by parasites, bacterial infection, and tumor growth. It is also the cause of septic shock and may play a role in many diseases with an autoimmune etiology.

NOS signaling is involved in development and in fertilization in vertebrates. It has been implicated in transitions between vegetative and reproductive states in invertebrates, and in differentiation leading to spore formation in slime molds. NO produced by bacterial NOS is protective against oxidative damage.

NOS activity has also been correlated with major depressive episodes (MDEs) in the context of major depressive disorder, in a large case-control treatment study published in mid-2021. 460 patients with a current major depressive episode were compared to 895 healthy patients, and by measuring L-citrulline/L-arginine ratio before and after 3–6 months of antidepressant treatment, results indicate that patients in a major depressive episode have significantly lower NOS activity compared to healthy patients, whilst treatment with antidepressants significantly elevated NOS activity levels in patients in a major depressive episode.

== Mammalian isoforms ==
Different members of the NOS family are encoded by separate genes. There are three known isoforms in mammals, two are constitutive (cNOS) and the third is inducible (iNOS). Cloning of NOS enzymes indicates that cNOS include both brain constitutive (NOS1) and endothelial constitutive (NOS3); the third is the inducible (NOS2) gene. Recently, NOS activity has been demonstrated in several bacterial species, including the notorious pathogens Bacillus anthracis and Staphylococcus aureus.

The different forms of NO synthase have been classified as follows:

| Name | Gene(s) | Location | Function |
|---|---|---|---|
| Neuronal NOS (nNOS or NOS1) | NOS1 (Chromosome 12) | nervous tissue; skeletal muscle type II | multiple functions (see below) |
| Inducible NOS (iNOS or NOS2) Calcium insensitive | NOS2 (Chromosome 17) | immune system; cardiovascular system | immune defense against pathogens |
| Endothelial NOS (eNOS or NOS3 or cNOS) | NOS3 (Chromosome 7) | endothelium | vasodilation |

=== nNOS ===
Neuronal NOS (nNOS) produces NO in nervous tissue in both the central and peripheral nervous systems. Its functions include:

- Synaptic plasticity in the central nervous system (CNS)
- Smooth muscle relaxation
- Central regulation of blood pressure
- Vasodilatation via peripheral nitrergic nerves

Neuronal NOS also performs a role in cell communication and is associated with plasma membranes. nNOS action can be inhibited by NPA (N-propyl-L-arginine). This form of the enzyme is specifically inhibited by 7-nitroindazole.

The subcellular localisation of nNOS in skeletal muscle is mediated by anchoring of nNOS to dystrophin. nNOS contains an additional N-terminal domain, the PDZ domain.

The gene coding for nNOS is located on Chromosome 12.

=== iNOS ===
As opposed to the critical calcium-dependent regulation of constitutive NOS enzymes (nNOS and eNOS), iNOS has been described as calcium-insensitive, likely due to its tight non-covalent interaction with calmodulin (CaM) and Ca^{2+}. The gene coding for iNOS is located on Chromosome 17. While evidence for 'baseline' iNOS expression has been elusive, IRF1 and NF-κB-dependent activation of the inducible NOS promoter supports an inflammation mediated stimulation of this transcript. iNOS produces large quantities of NO upon stimulation, such as by proinflammatory cytokines (e.g. Interleukin-1, Tumor necrosis factor alpha and Interferon gamma).

Induction of the high-output iNOS usually occurs in an oxidative environment, and thus high levels of NO have the opportunity to react with superoxide leading to peroxynitrite formation and cell toxicity. These properties may define the roles of iNOS in host immunity, enabling its participation in anti-microbial and anti-tumor activities as part of the oxidative burst of macrophages.

It has been suggested that pathologic generation of nitric oxide through increased iNOS production may decrease tubal ciliary beats and smooth muscle contractions and thus affect embryo transport, which may consequently result in ectopic pregnancy.

=== eNOS ===
Endothelial NOS (eNOS), also known as nitric oxide synthase 3 (NOS3), generates NO in blood vessels and is involved with regulating vascular function. The gene coding for eNOS is located on Chromosome 7. A constitutive Ca^{2+} dependent NOS provides a basal release of NO. eNOS localizes to caveolae, a plasma membrane domain primarily composed of the protein caveolin 1, and to the Golgi apparatus. These two eNOS populations are distinct, but are both necessary for proper NO production and cell health. eNOS localization to endothelial membranes is mediated by cotranslational N-terminal myristoylation and post-translational palmitoylation. As an essential co-factor for nitric oxide synthase, tetrahydrobiopterin (BH4) supplementation has shown beneficial results for the treatment of endothelial dysfunction in animal experiments and clinical trials, although the tendency of BH4 to become oxidized to BH2 remains a problem.

== Structure ==
The enzymes exist as homodimers. In eukaryotes, each monomer consisting of two major regions: an N-terminal oxygenase domain, which belongs to the class of heme-thiolate proteins, and a multi-domain C-terminal reductase, which is homologous to NADPH:cytochrome P450 reductase (EC 1.6.2.4) and other flavoproteins. The FMN binding domain is homologous to flavodoxins, and the two domain fragment containing the FAD and NADPH binding sites is homologous to flavodoxin-NADPH reductases. The interdomain linker between the oxygenase and reductase domains contains a calmodulin-binding sequence. The oxygenase domain is a unique extended beta sheet cage with binding sites for heme and pterin.

NOSs can be dimeric, calmodulin-dependent or calmodulin-containing cytochrome p450-like hemoprotein that combines reductase and oxygenase catalytic domains in one dimer, bear both flavin adenine dinucleotide (FAD) and flavin mononucleotide (FMN), and carry out a 5`-electron oxidation of non-aromatic amino acid arginine with the aid of tetrahydrobiopterin.

All three isoforms (each of which is presumed to function as a homodimer during activation) share a carboxyl-terminal reductase domain homologous to the cytochrome P450 reductase. They also share an amino-terminal oxygenase domain containing a heme prosthetic group, which is linked in the middle of the protein to a calmodulin-binding domain. Binding of calmodulin appears to act as a "molecular switch" to enable electron flow from flavin prosthetic groups in the reductase domain to heme. This facilitates the conversion of O_{2} and L-arginine to NO and L-citrulline. The oxygenase domain of each NOS isoform also contains an BH_{4} prosthetic group, which is required for the efficient generation of NO. Unlike other enzymes where BH_{4} is used as a source of reducing equivalents and is recycled by dihydrobiopterin reductase (EC 1.5.1.33), BH_{4} activates heme-bound O_{2} by donating a single electron, which is then recaptured to enable nitric oxide release.

The first nitric oxide synthase to be identified was found in neuronal tissue (NOS1 or nNOS); the endothelial NOS (eNOS or NOS3) was the third to be identified. They were originally classified as "constitutively expressed" and "Ca^{2+} sensitive" but it is now known that they are present in many different cell types and that expression is regulated under specific physiological conditions.

In NOS1 and NOS3, physiological concentrations of Ca^{2+} in cells regulate the binding of calmodulin to the "latch domains", thereby initiating electron transfer from the flavins to the heme moieties. In contrast, calmodulin remains tightly bound to the inducible and Ca^{2+}-insensitive isoform (iNOS or NOS2) even at a low intracellular Ca^{2+} activity, acting essentially as a subunit of this isoform.

Nitric oxide may itself regulate NOS expression and activity. Specifically, NO has been shown to play an important negative feedback regulatory role on NOS3, and therefore vascular endothelial cell function. This process, known formally as S-nitrosation (and referred to by many in the field as S-nitrosylation), has been shown to reversibly inhibit NOS3 activity in vascular endothelial cells. This process may be important because it is regulated by cellular redox conditions and may thereby provide a mechanism for the association between "oxidative stress" and endothelial dysfunction. In addition to NOS3, both NOS1 and NOS2 have been found to be S-nitrosated, but the evidence for dynamic regulation of those NOS isoforms by this process is less complete. In addition, both NOS1 and NOS2 have been shown to form ferrous-nitrosyl complexes in their heme prosthetic groups that may act partially to self-inactivate these enzymes under certain conditions. The rate-limiting step for the production of nitric oxide may well be the availability of L-arginine in some cell types. This may be particularly important after the induction of NOS2.

== Inhibitors ==
Ronopterin (VAS-203), also known as 4-amino-tetrahydrobiopterin (4-ABH_{4}), an analogue of BH_{4} (a cofactor of NOS), is an NOS inhibitor that is under development as a neuroprotective agent for the treatment of traumatic brain injury. Other NOS inhibitors that have been or are being researched for possible clinical use include cindunistat, A-84643, ONO-1714, L-NOARG, NCX-456, VAS-2381, GW-273629, NXN-462, CKD-712, KD-7040, and guanidinoethyldisulfide, TFPI among others.

== In non-mammal eukaryotes ==
NOS is found in many groups of eukaryotes (metazoans, fungi, algae, plants), mostly sharing the fused oxygenase-CAM-flavin-FNR structure of mammalian NOS. There can, however, be important changes to the structure. For example, a number of algal NOS has a C-terminal globin domain, which could confer additional functionality.

== In prokaryotes ==
| Name | Gene(s) | Location | Function |
|---|---|---|---|
| Bacterial NOS (bNOS) | multiple | Gram-positive bacteria (various) | defense against oxidative stress, antibiotics, immune attack |

Bacterial NOS (bNOS) has been shown to protect bacteria against oxidative stress, diverse antibiotics, and host immune response. bNOS plays a key role in the transcription of superoxide dismutase (SodA). Bacteria late in the log phase who do not possess bNOS fail to upregulate SodA, which disables the defenses against harmful oxidative stress. Initially, bNOS may have been present to prepare the cell for stressful conditions but now seems to help shield the bacteria against conventional antimicrobials. As a clinical application, a bNOS inhibitor could be produced to decrease the load of Gram positive bacteria.

They seem to have a similar function in archaea.

They exist in a wide variety of bacteria, including Gram negative ones (the aforementioned Sorangium cellulosum is Gram negative). The fused [Fe-S] NOS is by no means rare among bacteria, being seen across Cyanobacteria and Proteobacteria.

== See also ==
- Biological functions of nitric oxide
