= Oxylipin =

Class of lipids

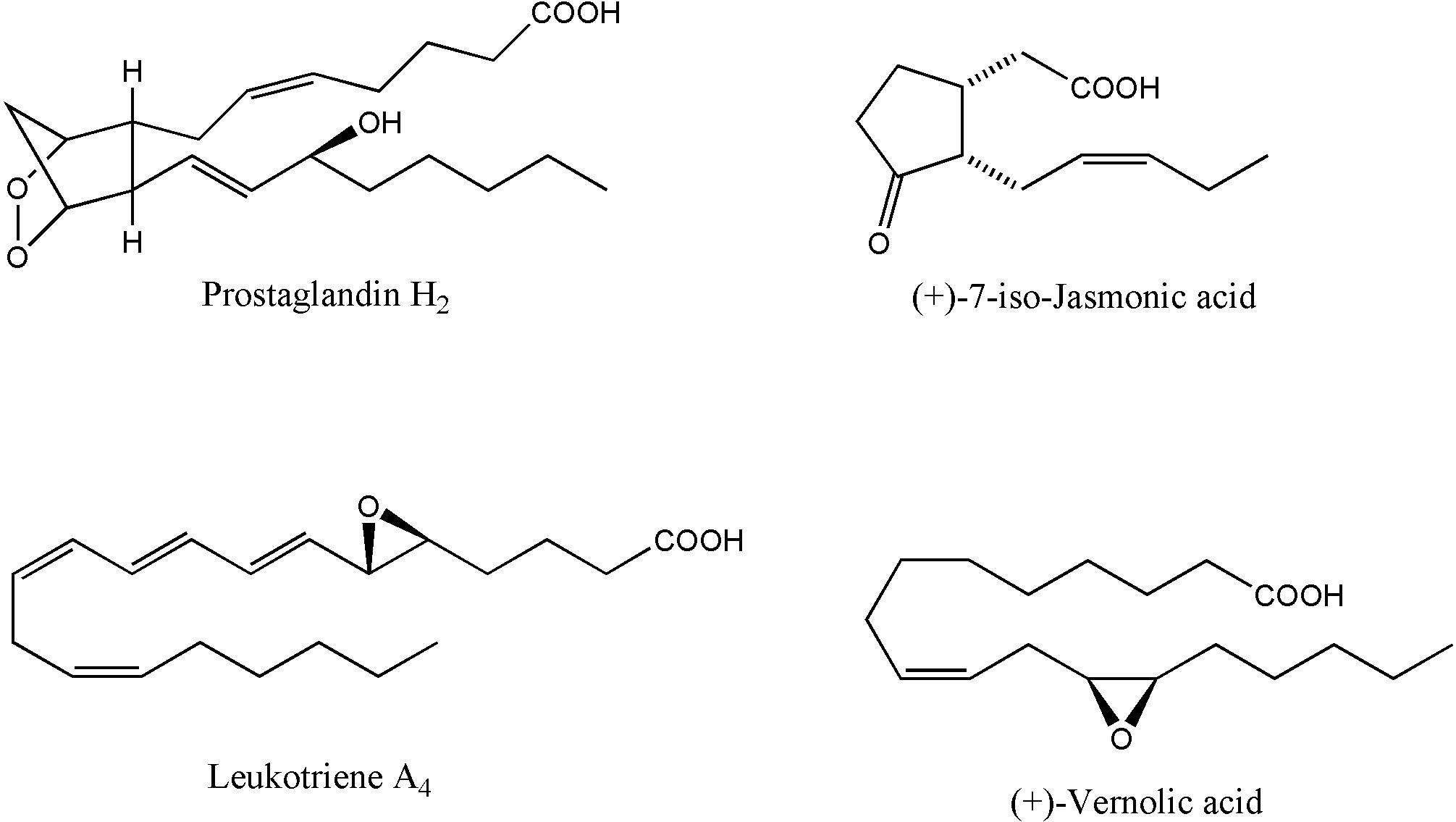
The structural formulae of selected oxylipins

Oxylipins constitute a family of oxygenated natural products which are formed from fatty acids by pathways involving at least one step of dioxygen-dependent oxidation. These small polar lipid compounds are metabolites of polyunsaturated fatty acids (PUFAs) including omega-3 fatty acids and omega-6 fatty acids. Oxylipins are formed by enzymatic or non-enzymatic oxidation of PUFAs.

In animal species, four main pathways of oxylipin production prevail: lipoxygenases (LOXs) pathway, cyklooxygenases (COXs) route, cytochrome P450 (CYPs) pathway, and reactive oxygen species (ROS) route. These pathways result in formation of many different oxylipin molecules which are important for number of processes in living organisms. The processes include inflammation, blood flow, energy metabolism, cellular life, cell signaling, or muscle contractions. Oxylipins have both pro- and anti-inflammatory roles.

Oxylipins are widespread in aerobic organisms including plants, animals and fungi. Many of oxylipins have physiological significance. Typically, oxylipins are not stored in tissues but are formed on demand by liberation of precursor fatty acids from esterified forms.

== Biosynthesis ==
Biosynthesis of oxylipins is initiated by dioxygenases or monooxygenases; however also non-enzymatic autoxidative processes contribute to oxylipin formation (phytoprostanes, isoprostanes). Dioxygenases include lipoxygenases (plants, animals, fungi), heme-dependent fatty acid oxygenases (plants, fungi), and cyclooxygenases (animals). Fatty acid hydroperoxides or endoperoxides are formed by action of these enzymes. Monooxygenases involved in oxylipin biosynthesis are members of the cytochrome P450 superfamily and can oxidize double bonds with epoxide formation or saturated carbons forming alcohols. Nature has evolved numerous enzymes which metabolize oxylipins into secondary products, many of which possess strong biological activity. Of special importance are the cytochrome P450 enzymes in animals, including CYP5A1 (thromboxane synthase), CYP8A1 (prostacyclin synthase), and the CYP74 family of hydroperoxide-metabolizing enzymes in plants, lower animals and bacteria. In the plant and animal kingdoms the C18 and C20 polyenoic fatty acids, respectively, are the major precursors of oxylipins.

== Structure and function ==
Oxylipins in animals, referred to as eicosanoids (Greek icosa; twenty) because of their formation from twenty-carbon essential fatty acids, have potent and often opposing effects on e.g. smooth muscle (vasculature, myometrium) and blood platelets. Certain eicosanoids (leukotrienes B4 and C4) are proinflammatory whereas others (resolvins, protectins) are anti-inflammatory and are involved in the resolution process which follows tissue injury. Plant oxylipins are mainly involved in control of ontogenesis, reproductive processes and in the resistance to various microbial pathogens and other pests.

Oxylipins most often act in an autocrine or paracrine manner, notably in targeting peroxisome proliferator-activated receptors (PPARs) to modify adipocyte formation and function.

Most oxylipins in the body are derived from linoleic acid or alpha-linolenic acid. Linoleic acid oxylipins are usually present in blood and tissue in higher concentrations than any other PUFA oxylipin, despite the fact that alpha-linolenic acid is more readily metabolized to oxylipin.

Linoleic acid oxylipins can be anti-inflammatory, but are more often pro-inflammatory, associated with atherosclerosis, non-alcoholic fatty liver disease, and Alzheimer's disease. Centenarians have shown reduced levels of linoleic acid oxylipins in their blood circulation. Lowering dietary linoleic acid results in fewer linoleic acid oxylipins in humans. From 1955 to 2005 the linoleic acid content of human adipose tissue has risen an estimated 136% in the United States.

In general, oxylipins derived from omega-6 fatty acids are more pro-inflammatory, vasoconstrictive, and proliferative than those derived from omega-3 fatty acids. The omega-3 eicosapentaenoic acid (EPA)-derived and docosahexaenoic acid (DHA)-derived oxylipins are anti-inflammatory and vasodilatory. In a clinical trial of men with high triglycerides, 3 grams daily of DHA compared with placebo (olive oil) given for 91 days nearly tripled the DHA in red blood cells while reducing oxylipins in those cells. Both groups were given Vitamin C (ascorbyl palmitate) and Vitamin E (mixed tocopherol) supplements.

== Oxylipins and disease ==
Oxylipins play important role in many diseases, for example, diabetes, obesity, cardiovascular diseases, cancer, COVID-19, or neurodegenerative disorders. Changes in oxylipin metabolism have been reported in these diseases. In 2021, Alzheimer's disease was associated with changes in oxylipin levels in plasma and cerebrospinal fluid (CSF) for the first time. Interestingly, improvement in neurodegenerative diseases and also cardiovascular diseases may be achieved by using inhibitors of an enzyme (soluble epoxide hydrolase) involved in formation of oxylipins. In Parkinson's disease, oxylipin profiles reflect the stage of the disease. This should be taken into consideration when choosing the suitable medication for Parkinson's disease.
