= D-DOPA =

d-DOPA
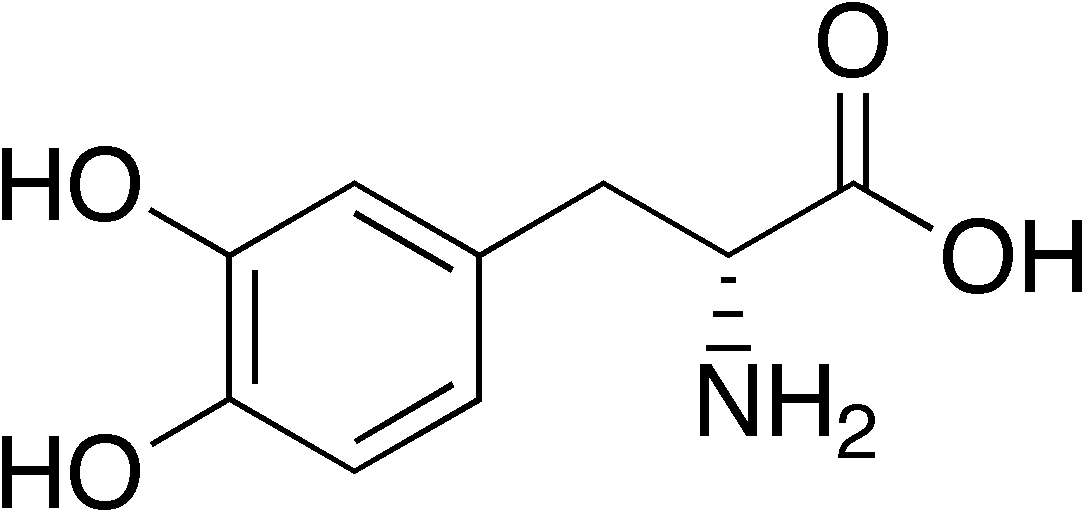

Names
- IUPAC name 3,4-Dihydroxy-D-phenylalanine
- Systematic IUPAC name (2R)-2-Amino-3-(3,4-dihydroxyphenyl)propanoic acid

Identifiers
CAS Number	5796-17-8
3D model (JSmol)	Interactive image
ChemSpider	83260
ECHA InfoCard	100.024.858
PubChem CID	92222
UNII	8T862R29FY
CompTox Dashboard (EPA)	DTXSID70206673
- InChI: InChI=1/C9H11NO4/c10-6(9(13)14)3-5-1-2-7(11)8(12)4-5/h1-2,4,6,11-12H,3,10H2,(H,13,14)/t6-/m1/s1 Key: WTDRDQBEARUVNC-ZCFIWIBFBC
- SMILES: O=C(O)[C@H](N)Cc1cc(O)c(O)cc1

Properties
Chemical formula	C_{9}H_{11}NO_{4}
Molar mass	197.19 g/mol
- Except where otherwise noted, data are given for materials in their standard state (at 25 °C [77 °F], 100 kPa). Infobox references

d-DOPA (D-3,4-dihydroxyphenylalanine; dextrodopa) is similar to L-DOPA (levodopa), but with opposite chirality. Levo- and dextro- rotation refer to a molecule's ability to rotate planes of polarized light in one or the other direction. Whereas L-DOPA is moderately effective in the treatment of Parkinson's disease (PD) and dopamine-responsive dystonia (DRD) by stimulating the production of dopamine in the brain, D-DOPA is biologically inactive.

Avoiding unwanted production of D-DOPA is a goal for commercial synthesis of L-DOPA-based drugs to treat Parkinson's disease.

== See also ==
- l-DOPA (Levodopa; Sinemet, Parcopa, Atamet, Stalevo, Madopar, Prolopa, etc.)
- l-DOPS (Droxidopa)
- Methyldopa (Aldomet, Apo-Methyldopa, Dopamet, Novomedopa, etc.)
- Dopamine (Intropan, Inovan, Revivan, Rivimine, Dopastat, Dynatra, etc.)
- Norepinephrine (Noradrenaline; Levophed, etc.)
- Epinephrine (Adrenaline; Adrenalin, EpiPen, Twinject, etc.)
