= Syndecan =

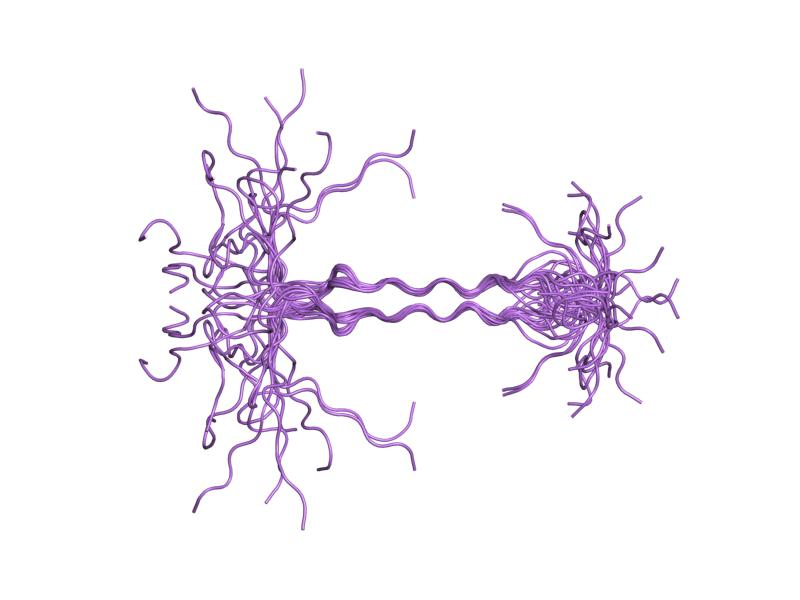
- Solution structure of the Syndecan-4 whole cytoplasmic domain in the presence of phosphatidylinositol 4,5-bisphosphate.

Identifiers
- Symbol: Syndecan
- Pfam: PF01034
- InterPro: IPR001050
- PROSITE: PDOC00745
- SCOP2: 1ejp / SCOPe / SUPFAM
- OPM superfamily: 535
- OPM protein: 6ith
- Membranome: 18
Available protein structures:
- PDB: IPR001050 PF01034 (ECOD; PDBsum)
- AlphaFold: IPR001050; PF01034

Syndecans are single-pass membrane proteins that are thought to act as co-receptors, especially for G protein-coupled receptors. More specifically, these core proteins carry three to five heparan sulfate and chondroitin sulfate chains, i.e. they are proteoglycans, which allow for interaction with a large variety of ligands including fibroblast growth factors, vascular endothelial growth factor, transforming growth factor-beta, fibronectin and antithrombin-1. Interactions between fibronectin and some syndecans can be modulated by the extracellular matrix protein tenascin C.

== Family members and Structure ==
The syndecan protein family has four members. Syndecans 1 and 3 and syndecans 2 and 4, making up separate subfamilies, arose by gene duplication and divergent evolution from a single ancestral gene. All syndecans have an N-terminal signal peptide, an ectodomain, a single hydrophobic transmembrane domain, and a short C-terminal cytoplasmic domain. All syndecans are anchored to plasma membrane via a 24-25 amino acid long hydrophobic transmembrane domain, in contrast to another type of cell surface proteoglycans that attaches to cell membrane using a glycosyl-phosphatidyl-inositol linkage. The most obvious differences between syndecans include (together with differences in distribution) the subclassification of the family depending on the existence of GAG binding sites either at both ends of the ectodomain (syndecan-1 and syndecan-3) or at the distal part only (syndecan-2 and syndecan-4) and a relatively long Thr-Ser-Pro-rich area in the middle of syndecan-3's ectodomain. The ectodomains show the least amount of amino acid sequence conservation, not more than 10–20%; in contrast, the transmembrane and cytoplasmic domains share approximately 60–70% amino acid sequence identity. The transmembrane domains contain an unusual alanine/glycine sequence motif, while the cytoplasmic domain is essentially composed of two regions of conserved amino acid sequence (C1 and C2), separated by a central variable sequence of amino acids that is distinct for each family member (V).

In mammalian cells, syndecans are expressed by unique genes located on different chromosomes. This is general lack of evidence of alternate splicing in syndecan genes. All members of the syndecan family have 5 exons. The difference in size of the syndecans is credited to the variable length of exon 3, which encodes a spacer domain. In humans, the amino acid length of syndecan 1, 2, 3 and 4 is 310, 201, 346 and 198 respectively. Glycosaminoglycan chains, a member of the heparan sulfate group, are an important component of syndecan and are responsible for a diverse set of syndecan functions. The addition of glycosaminoglycans to syndecan is controlled by a series of post-translation events. The preferential site for the addition of glycosaminoglycans is on a serine residue followed by glycine residue, where the linker is attached for the elongation of the glycosaminoglycans by α-N-acetylglucosaminyltransferase I. The linker is composed of four saccharides, first one being xylose, which is an unusual sugar in a unique place, attached to serine of the protein core and sequentially followed by two galactose and one β-D-glucuronic acid.

== Expression ==
Syndecans are expressed on the cell surface in a cell-specific manner. For example, in mouse cells and tissues, syndecan 1 is highly expressed in fibroblastic and epithelial cells. It is especially high in keratinocytes whereas low in endothelial and neural cells. These tissues include skin, liver, kidney and lungs. Syndecan 2 is highly expressed in endothelial, neural, and fibroblastic cells, whereas it has low expression levels in epithelial cells. It is specific to tissues such as the liver, endothelia and fibroblasts. Syndecan 3 is highly expressed in neural cells, but has low or undetectable amount in epithelial cells. In tissues, it is specific to the brain and expressed at low levels in liver, kidney, lung and small intestine. Syndecan 4 is highly expressed by epithelial and fibroblastic cells, but has low expression levels in neural and endothelial cells. In tissues, it is preferentially expressed in the liver and lungs.

== Functions ==
Functionality of syndecan is contributed by glycosaminoglycans which help in the interaction with different extracellular ligands. Depending upon the cellular localization of syndecan, glycosaminoglycans have different structures to accommodate the functional needs of the region. The syndecans are known to form homologous oligomers that may be important for their functions.

Functions of syndecan can be categorized in four ways, the first of which is via growth factor-receptor activation. Glycosaminoglycans attached to syndecan mediate the binding of various growth factors and thereby modulate the activation of a number of cellular signaling mechanisms. Growth factors such as FGF2, HGF, EGF, VEGF, neuregulins and others interact are known to interact with syndecans. For example, at the site of tissue injury, the soluble syndecan-1 ectodomains are cleaved by heparanases, producing heparin-like fragments that activate bFGF. Whereas most growth factors interact with syndecans via heparan sulfate chains, the prosecretory mitogen lacritin requires heparanase to both expose and create a binding site in the N-terminus of syndecan 1.

As a cell surface proteoglycan, syndecan is also significantly involved in mediating extracellular matrix adhesion. Syndecans bind to structural components of the extracellular matrix such as collagens I, III, and V, fibronectin, thrombospondin, and tenascin to provide structural support for cellular adhesion. Syndecan 4 is also known to interact with integrin proteins for cell–cell adhesion.

== Protein Domains ==
The syndecan proteins can contain the following protein domains:

- A signal sequence
- An extracellular domain (ectodomain) of variable length whose sequence is not evolutionarily conserved in the various forms of syndecans, which contains attachment sites for heparan sulphate glycosaminoglycan chains
- A transmembrane region
- A highly conserved cytoplasmic domain of about 30 to 35 residues, which may interact with cytoskeletal proteins

== Clinical significance ==
=== Endometriosis ===
Syndecan-4 is upregulated in endometriosis and inhibition of syndecan-4 in human endometriotic cells results in a reduction of invasive growth in vitro and changes in matrix metalloproteinase expression.

=== Osteoarthritis ===
Syndecan-4 is upregulated in osteoarthritis and inhibition of syndecan-4 reduces cartilage destruction in mouse models of OA.

=== Metabolic regulation and body composition ===
The Drosophila syndecan homologue (dSdc) and human syndecan-4 have been implicated in energy homeostasis.

=== Multiple Myeloma ===
Syndecan 1 is the most studied of all the syndecans in cancer research. Many studies have shown that syndecan 1 plays an important role in cancer progression, such that it may be used as a biomarker for certain cancer types. High levels of syndecan 1 have been reported in the bone marrow of the patients with multiple myeloma, and high syndecan-1 serum concentrations have been associated with poor disease prognosis.

Syndecan 1 also has been associated with cancer progression given its modulatory effects in growth factors signaling. For instance, syndecan 1 expression is increased in ductal breast carcinomas and is associated with factors of angiogenesis and lymphangiogenesis. Studies from patients suffering from endometrial cancer have shown that these patients have increased syndecan 1 expression, and also that expression of this protein positively regulates the endometrial hyperplasia that can progress to endometrial cancer.
