= Cantuzumab mertansine =

Pharmaceutical drug

Monoclonal antibody
- Type: Whole antibody
- Source: Humanized (from mouse)
- Target: MUC1

Clinical data
- ATC code: none

Identifiers
- CAS Number: 400010-39-1
- ChemSpider: none
- UNII: 7Z7EUX7R6M

Cantuzumab mertansine (SB-408075; huC242-DM1) is an antibody-drug conjugate investigated to treat colorectal cancer and other types of cancer. It is a humanized monoclonal antibody, cantuzumab (huC242) linked to a cytotoxic agent, mertansine (DM1). It was developed by ImmunoGen.

== Mechanism ==
After the huC242 mab binds to the external domain of CanAg, the cantuzumab mertansine-CanAg complex is internalized, and the DM1 molecules are released intracellularly by cleavage of the DM1-huC242 disulfide bonds.

== Clinical trials ==
Three phase I clinical studies had reported results by 2003. By 2005, clinical development had been suspended.

== See also ==
- Cantuzumab ravtansine
