= Ravtansine =

Ravtansine is a component of several drug conjugates and may refer to:

- Cantuzumab ravtansine
- Indatuximab ravtansine

== See also ==
- Maitansine
