= Urofacial syndrome =

- Other names: Ochoa syndrome
- Ochoa Syndrome has an autosomal recessive pattern of inheritance.

Urofacial syndrome, or Ochoa syndrome, is an autosomal recessive congenital disorder characterized by an association of a lower urinary tract and bowel dysfunction with a typical facial expression: when attempting to smile, the patient seems to be crying or grimacing. It was first described by the Colombian physician Bernardo Ochoa in the early 1960s. The inverted facial expression presented by children with this syndrome allows for early detection of the syndrome, which is vital for establishing a better prognosis as urinary related problems associated with this disease can cause harm if left untreated. Incontinence is another easily detectable symptom of the syndrome that is due to detrusor-sphincter discoordination.

It may be associated with HPSE2.

== Signs and symptoms ==
Infants with the disorder exhibit an inverted smile, appearing to cry when they are actually smiling. This occurs in conjunction with uropathy, and patients may also be affected by hydronephrosis. Symptoms can emerge at a very young age. Many people with this syndrome will die in their teens to early 20s due to renal failure (uropathy) if not diagnosed and treated. Children with the syndrome have abnormal facial development that causes an inverted smile; however, their nerve connections are normal. When attempting to smile, the child will appear to cry. Urinary problems arise as a result of a neurogenic bladder. Most patients older than the age of toilet training, present with enuresis, urinary-tract infection, hydronephrosis, and a spectrum of radiological abnormalities typical of obstructive or neurogenic bladders. Radiological abnormalities include things such as: trabeculated bladder, vesicoureteral reflex, external sphincter spasm, pyelonephritis, hyperreflexic bladder, noninhibited detrusor contraction, etc. Urinary abnormalities might result in renal deterioration and failure. This can be prevented by taking proper measures to restore normal micturition and by taking antibiotics to prevent infections. In some cases, the affected patients become hypertensive and progress to end-stage renal disease, while others become uremic. Additionally, most patients suffer from constipation. Early detection of this syndrome is possible through the peculiar faces that children present.

== Cause ==
Urofacial syndrome occurs due to either disruption or mutation of a gene on chromosome 10q23q24. The gene is located on a 1 centimorgan interval between D10S1433 and D10S603. Alteration of this gene leads to alteration of facial and urinary developmental fields. This gene is believed to be the HPSE2 gene. The HPSE2 gene is expressed in both the central nervous system as well as the bladder. Heparanase 2 is protein coded by exons 8 and 9 on the HPSE2 gene. This protein is believed to be altered in the case of this syndrome. Studies performed on mice indicate that HPSE2 has no enzymatic activity.

Mutations in the HPSE2 gene on chromosome 10q23q24 have been observed to cause Ochoa Syndrome. This means the defective gene responsible for the disorder is located on an autosome (chromosome 10 is an autosome), and two copies of the defective gene (one inherited from each parent) are required in order to be born with the disorder. The parents of an individual with an autosomal recessive disorder both carry one copy of the defective gene, but usually do not experience any signs or symptoms of the disorder.

The relationship between a defective HPSE2 gene and Ochoa syndrome is unclear. Early on, there was speculation that the genetic changes may lead to an abnormality in the brain stem. Evidence for this postulation was that the areas of the brain that control facial expression (VII nerve nuclei) and urination (the pontine micturition centre) were believed to be in close proximity of each other. Other hypotheses posit that the defective heparanase 2 protein may lead to problems with development of the urinary tract autonomic nervous system, or with muscle function in the face and bladder.

== Treatment ==
The treatment varies based on the condition and extent of the uropathy. To empty the bladder regularly, clean intermittent catheterization (CIC) can be used. If the urodynamic study shows non-inhibited detrusor contractions, an anticholinergic drug should be given additionally. To prevent recurrent infections, especially in the case of vesicoureteral reflux, the treatment can also include an antibiotic prophylaxis.

== Epidemiology ==
Urofacial (Ochoa) syndrome received the Ochoa name because of the first person to describe it in 1987, Bernardo Ochoa.
