= Cantuzumab =

Pharmaceutical compound

Cantuzumab is a monoclonal antibody designed for the treatment of cancers. Also known as huC242 it binds the CanAg antigen.

It is typically linked to one of several cytotoxic agents, yielding antibody-drug conjugates :

- Cantuzumab mertansine
- Cantuzumab ravtansine

== huC242 targets CanAg ==
"HuC242 binds to the extracellular domain of the tumor-associated carbohydrate antigen known as CanAg (a novel glycoform of MUC1). CanAg is strongly expressed in most pancreatic, biliary, and colorectal cancers. It is also expressed in a substantial proportion of gastric cancers (55%), uterine cancers (45%), non-small cell lung cancers (40%), and bladder cancers (40%)."
