= Indatuximab ravtansine =

Chemical compound

Monoclonal antibody
- Type: Whole antibody
- Source: Chimeric (mouse/human)
- Target: SDC1

Clinical data
- ATC code: none

Identifiers
- CAS Number: 1238517-16-2
- ChemSpider: none
- UNII: XGL4M23834

Indatuximab ravtansine (BT062) is an immunomodulator and antineoplastic antibody-drug conjugate.

It is the anti-CD138 chimerized MAb (nBT062) linked to the maytansinoid DM4.

It is being investigated as part of a treatment for multiple myeloma.

== Clinical trials ==
=== Multiple Myeloma ===
Preliminary data has been reported in 2013 from an early stage clinical trial in combination with Lenalidomide and Dexamethasone. Follow up data reported "encouraging efficacy" in December 2014.

=== Other ===
As of December 2014, it is in clinical trials for triple negative metastatic breast cancer and metastatic urinary bladder cancer.

== Mechanism of action ==
CD138 (Syndecan-1) is highly overexpressed on various solid tumors and in hematological malignancies, and represents one of the most specific target antigens for identification of multiple myeloma (MM) cells. The antibody part binds to CD138 on the target cells and then the DM4 kills the cell.

== See also ==
- ImmunoGen, more on DM1/DM4 and the linker used in Indatuximab ravtansine
- Syndecan 1, the protein encoded by SDC1.
