= Extramammary Paget's disease =

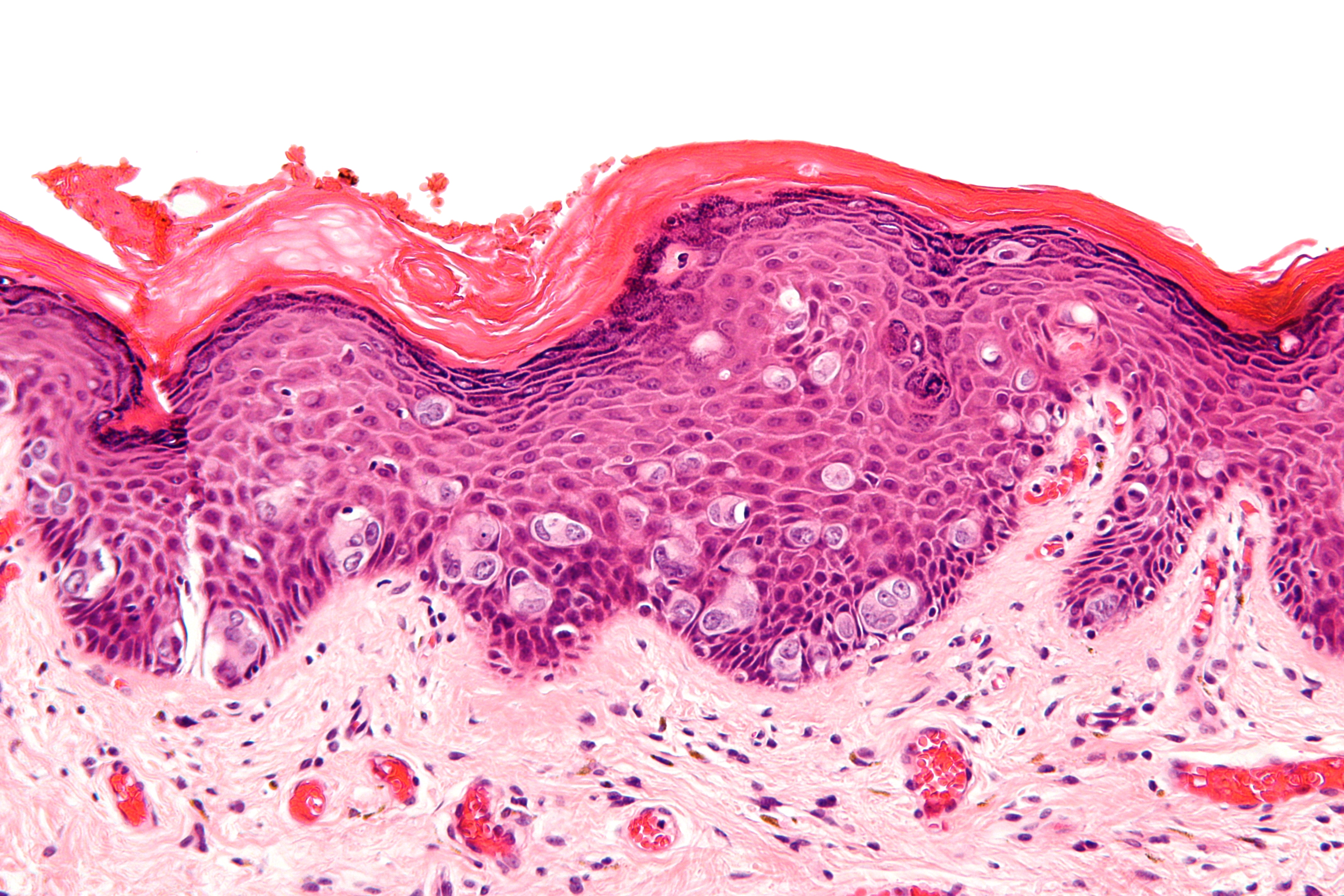
- Micrograph of extramammary Paget's disease, H&E stain
- Specialty: Dermatology, Oncology
- Symptoms: Rash, Itchiness, Eczematous lesions, Pain
- Causes: Unknown
- Diagnostic method: Excisional biopsy, histological pattern
- Named after: James Paget

Extramammary Paget's disease (EMPD) is a rare and slow-growing cancer, which occurs within the epithelial tissues and accounts for 6.5% of all Paget's disease. This disease presents similarly to the more conventional form of mammary Paget's disease (MPD). However, unlike MPD, which occurs in large milk-carrying ducts in the breast and then extends into the epidermis, EMPD begins in glandular regions rich in apocrine secretions outside the mammary glands. EMPD incidence is increasing by 3.2% every year, affecting hormonally-targeted tissues such as the vulva and scrotum. In women, 81.3% of EMPD cases are related to the vulva, while for men, 43.2% of the manifestations present at the scrotum.

The disease can be classified as being either primary or secondary depending on the presence or absence of associated malignancies. EMPD presents with typical symptoms such as scaly, erythematous, eczematous lesions accompanied by itchiness. In addition to this, 10% of patients are often asymptomatic. As a consequence, EMPD has high rates of misdiagnoses and delayed diagnoses. There are a variety of treatment options available, but most are unsuccessful. If caught early and treated, prognosis is generally good.

== Signs and symptoms ==
Patients with EMPD present with typical symptoms, similar to MPD, such as severe itchiness (also called pruritus), rash, plaque formation, burning sensation, pain and tenderness. These symptoms are often confused for dermatitis or eczema. 10% of patients are asymptomatic resulting in delayed diagnosis. In rare cases bleeding can also be seen.

Symptoms of extramammary Paget's disease

Skin -

- Temporary rash
- itchiness
- Redness of the skin
- well-defined, non-resolving, eczematous plaque
- hyperpigmented patches
- scaly
- lump
- thickened skin, appearing leathery

Discharge -

- blood
- ulceration

Sensation -

- burning sensation
- tenderness
- pain

Disease of the vulva

Vulvar Paget's disease affect women and presents as erythematous (red), eczematous lesions. It is itchy and sometimes pain can be associated with the affected area. The lesion is clearly separated from normal skin in most cases, and sometimes scattered areas of white scale can be present, giving a "strawberries and cream" appearance.

Involvement may be extensive including the perianal region, genitocrural, and inguinal folds. Clinical examination should determine the presence of periurethral and perianal lesions. In these cases an involvement of the skin by a noncutaneous internal neoplasm may occur.

== Pathophysiology ==
H&E stained micrograph of Extramammary Paget's disease, showing Paget cells infiltrating the epidermis

EMPD occurs due to an invasion of the epidermis by Paget cells. The cause of the disease is still under debate with recent research indicating that the disease may be associated with Toker cells.

=== Disease of the vulva ===
Originates from local organs such as the Bartholin gland, the urethra, or the rectum. Predilection towards postmenopausal women.

=== Metastatic disease ===
Metastasis of Paget cells from the epidermis to distant regions is a multistep process that involves:

1. Invasion of local lymph nodes and venous system
2. Movement out from lymph nodes and venous system
3. Proliferation at new site

Protein molecules HER2 and mTOR expressed in Paget cells are responsible for providing characteristics of proliferation and survival.

== Diagnosis ==
Due to the rarity of EMPD and lack of clinical knowledge, the disease is not very commonly diagnosed. Patients are often misdiagnosed with eczema or dermatitis and a delay of 2 years is expected from the onset of symptoms before a definitive diagnosis has been reached.

It is important to include that the lesion is associated with another cancer. A biopsy will establish the diagnosis. Punch biopsies are not effective in differentially diagnosing for EMPD and as a result, excisional biopsies of the affected area are taken [XX]. A positive test result for EMPD shows increased numbers of large polygonal cells with a pale bluish cytoplasm, large nucleus and nucleolus, infiltrating the epidermal layer. These neoplastic cells can be found singly scattered or can appear in groups called nests.

Paget cells contain mucin and cytokeratins which can be used in the diagnosis of EMPD [8] MUC5A2 is found in EMPD of the vulvar and male genitalia regions whereas MUC2 is expressed in perianal EMPD. Loss of MUC5A2 can indicate an invasive spread. Immunohistochemistry (IHC) can be used to determine whether EMPD is either primary or secondary. Primary EMPD tests positive for CK7 but negative for CK20, whereas secondary is positive for both. Lack of positivity for hormone receptors and HER2 protein is overexpressed meaning that the cells are dividing rapidly and can be indicate an aggressive and more recurrent disease.

=== Classification ===
Primary EMPD is of cutaneous origins and is found within the epidermis or the underlying apocrine glands. Although it is limited to the epithelium, it has potential to spread and progress into an invasive tumour, metastasising to the local lymph nodes and distant organs. This form of EMPD is not associated with an adenocarcinoma.

The secondary form results due to an underlying adenocarcinoma spreading to the epidermis. Similar to the primary form, if secondary EMPD invades the dermis, the neoplastic cells can metastasise to the lymph nodes and in some cases, the dermis.

According to the Wilkinson and Brown subclassification system, there are three subtypes for each classification.

Sub-classifications of primary and secondary extramammary disease
| Primary (cutaneous) | Secondary (non-cutaneous) |
|---|---|
| Intraepithelial cutaneous Paget disease of the usual type | Anorectal |
| Intraepithelial cutaneous Paget disease with invasion | Urothelial |
| Intraepithelial cutaneous Paget disease as a manifestation of underlying adenocarcinoma of skin appendage | Other |

== Treatment ==
Many chemotherapy treatments have been used, however the results are not desirable as prognosis remains to be poor. Surgery remains to be the preferred treatment of choice. Wide local excision with a 3 cm margin and intra-operative frozen sections are suggested, due to high risk of local extension despite normal appearing tissue. In cases where Paget cells have invaded the dermis and metastasized, complete removal is often unsuccessful. Recurrence is a common result. Lymphadenoectomy is often performed for infiltrative cases. In lieu of surgery, radiotherapy is also an option and is especially preferred for elderly patients or for inoperable cases where the tumour size is too large. This form of treatment is also considered as possible adjuvant therapy following excision to combat the high recurrence rate. However, there are side effects of radiotherapy, including but not limited to: vulvitis, post-radiation atrophy of mucous membranes, vaginal stenosis and sexual dysfunction.

Laser therapy and photodynamic therapies were also used in the past, but it was discovered the carbon dioxide laser did not penetrate deep enough and both treatment modalities resulted in high recurrence rates.

Topical chemotherapy treatments are effective, with imiquimod showing promising results. However, overall survival begins to decline 10 months following treatment with chemotherapy. Patients with metastatic EMPD only survive for a median of 1.5 years, and have a 7% 5-year survival rate.

== Prognosis ==
Prognosis is generally good, but factors such as depth of invasion and duration of disease need to be considered. In primary EMPD, if invasion of the underlying tissue is non-existent or even minimal, treatment options are more likely to be effective, however, if there are signs that the disease has metastasised, the prognosis is usually poor.

== Epidemiology ==
EMPD is most prevalent in Caucasian women and Asian men over the age of 60. The invasive form occurs in 5–25% of all EMPD patients and 17–30% of the cases involve an underlying adenocarcinoma. 10-20% of EMPD is of the secondary form. Approximately 10% of patients develop invasive adenocarcinoma that may progress to metastatic disease.

The disease affects regions that are rich in apocrine secretions. 65% EMPD occurs at the vulva, followed by 15% at perianal areas and 14% at the male genitalia. In terms of the vulva, the labia majora is the site that is most often involved, followed by labia minora, clitoris and perineum. EMPD originating at the vulva can spread to the upper vaginal mucosa and cervix. Other areas where EMPD can be found, although very rarely, include: the axillae, eyelids, external auditory canal, umbilical region, trunk and extremities.

== History ==
The first case of Paget's disease was described by James Paget in 1874. Radcliffe Crocker, in 1889, then described EMPD following an observation of a patient with urinary carcinoma affecting the penis and scrotum, showing symptoms that were almost identical to MPD as described by Paget. Later in 1893, Darier and Coulillaud described the perianal location of EMPD.
