= Immunogen (disambiguation) =

Immunogen may refer to:

- ImmunoGen, a pharmaceuticals company
- Immunogen, an antigen/epitope inducing an immune response
