= Lacritin =

Glycoprotein found in humans

LACRT

Identifiers
- Aliases: LACRT, entrez:90070, lacritin
- External IDs: OMIM: 607360; GeneCards: LACRT

Gene location (Human)
Chr.	Chromosome 12 (human)
Band	12q13.2	Start	54,630,811 bp
Band	12q13.2	End	54,634,895 bp
RNA expression pattern
Bgee	Human / Mouse (ortholog); Top expressed in: lacrimal gland; mucosa of nose; olfactory zone of nasal mucosa; tonsil; skin of leg; stromal cell of endometrium; mouth; salivary gland; mammary gland; female breast / n/a; More reference expression data
BioGPS	n/a
Gene ontology
Molecular function	laminin-1 binding; fibronectin binding; growth factor activity; collagen binding; protein N-terminus binding; protein binding
Cellular component	extracellular region; secretory granule; extracellular space
Biological process	positive regulation of peptidyl-tyrosine phosphorylation; calcineurin-NFAT signaling cascade; positive regulation of release of sequestered calcium ion into cytosol; calcium-mediated signaling; positive regulation of epithelial cell proliferation; protein localization to Golgi apparatus; epithelial structure maintenance; protein acetylation; positive regulation of cell population proliferation; positive regulation of epithelial cell proliferation involved in wound healing; positive regulation of macroautophagy; negative regulation of apoptotic process; tear secretion; negative regulation of lipopolysaccharide-mediated signaling pathway; positive regulation of secretion; positive regulation of calcium-mediated signaling; defense response to bacterium; regulation of signaling receptor activity; positive regulation of calcineurin-NFAT signaling cascade
Sources:Amigo / QuickGO
Orthologs
Databases	NCBI: entry; OMA: entry
Species	Human	Mouse
Entrez	90070	n/a
Ensembl	ENSG00000135413	n/a
UniProt	Q9GZZ8	n/a
RefSeq (mRNA)	NM_033277	n/a
RefSeq (protein)	NP_150593	n/a
Location (UCSC)	Chr 12: 54.63 – 54.63 Mb	n/a
PubMed search		n/a
- Wikidata
View/Edit Human

Lacritin is a 12.3 kDa glycoprotein encoded in humans by the LACRT gene. Lacritin's discovery emerged from a screen for factors that stimulate tear protein secretion. Lacritin is a secreted protein found in tears and saliva. Lacritin also promotes tear secretion, the proliferation and survival of epithelial cells, and corneal wound healing Lacritin is thus a multifunctional prosecretory mitogen with cell survival activity. Natural or bacterial cleavage of lacritin releases a C-terminal fragment that is bactericidal.

Most lacritin is produced by the lacrimal gland, including the accessory lacrimal gland of Wolfring. Some lacritin is produced by the meibomian gland, and by epithelial cells of the conjunctiva and cornea. Together these epithelia comprise much of the lacrimal functional unit (LFU). Dry eye is the most common disease of the LFU. A growing number of studies suggest that lacritin may be differentially downregulated in dry eye, including contact lens-related dry eye. Topical lacritin promotes tearing in rabbit preclinical studies. In the Aire knockout mouse model of dry eye (considered similar to human Sjogren's syndrome), topical lacritin restores pilocarpine-induced tearing, largely eliminates lissamine green staining and reduces the size of inflammatory foci in the lacrimal gland.

Lacritin cell targeting is dependent on the cell surface heparan sulfate proteoglycan syndecan-1 (SDC1). Binding utilizes an enzyme-regulated 'off-on' switch in which active epithelial heparanase (HPSE) cleaves off heparan sulfate to expose a binding site in the N-terminal region of syndecan-1's core protein. A G-protein-coupled receptor (GPCR) then appears to be ligated. Targeted cells signal to NFAT and mTOR if conditions are suitable for proliferation, or to AKT and FOXO3 under conditions of stress.

== Structure ==
Lacritin consists of 119 amino acids after cleavage of the N-terminal signal peptide and displays several predicted alpha helices, mostly in the C-terminal half. Of these, the two C-terminal ones have been confirmed by circular dichroism. The most C-terminal alpha helix is amphipathic with hydrophobic and hydrophilic residues on opposite faces. The hydrophobic face is an important syndecan-1 binding element. PONDR (Predictor of Naturally Disordered Regions) predicts that the C-terminal and N-terminal halves are respectively 'ordered' and 'disordered'. 11 - 12 predicted O-glycosylation sites populate the N-terminal half. The C-terminal amphipathic alpha helix is also the site of lacritin's only N-glycosylation site. In 'climatic droplet keratopathy' this site is not glycosylated. Lacritin recombinantly generated in E. coli (no glycosylation) and lacritin in tears (glycosylated) differ in size with respective mobilities of ~18 and ~25 kDa by SDS-PAGE. With a predicted protein core molecular weight of 12.3 kDa, it is possible that mobility is partially retarded by lacritin's amphipathic alpha helices. Predicted pI of lacritin's core protein is 5.

Lacritin is subject to crosslinking by tissue transglutaminase, thereby giving rise to lacritin multimers including dimers and trimers. Crosslinking is initiated within 1 min in vitro, requiring as little as 0.1 nM lacritin. The ~0.6 micro molar level of tissue transglutaminase estimated in human tears is sufficient to promote crosslinking. Crosslinking involves the donors lysine 82 and 85 and the acceptor glutamine 106. Glutamine 106 resides within the amphipathic alpha helix near the C-terminus responsible for binding the N-terminus of syndecan-1. Accordingly, crosslinked lacritin binds syndecan-1 poorly and is inactive.

Several lacritin splice variants have been detected in Aceview, from NEIBank EST data. Lacritin-b (11.1 kDa; pI 5.3) lacks the sequence SIVEKSILTE. Lacritin-c (10.7 kDa; pI 4.6) displays a novel C-terminus that should be incapable of binding syndecan-1, and lacks cell survival activity.

Splice variants are proteoforms. Proteoforms include proteolytically processed forms of lacritin. Top down mass spec sequencing revealed that human tears contain five N- and forty-two different C-terminal lacritin-a proteoforms. Some approximate the bioactive lacritin synthetic peptides 'N-104', 'N-94' and 'N-94/C-6' from lacritin's C-terminus. Protease inhibitor studies suggest that processing of lacritin into C-terminal proteoforms requires a variety of tear proteases including cathepsin B, calpain, alanyl amino peptidase, arginyl aminopeptidase, MMP9, MMP10, cathepsin G, plasma kallikrein, plasmin, thrombin and trypsin. C-terminal proteoforms, like intact lacritin, are selectively deficient in dry eye tears.

== Cell targeting ==
Lacritin targets a restricted group of epithelial cells (including human corneal epithelia), and not fibroblastic, glioma, or lymphoblastic cells. Cell surface proteoglycan syndecan-1 is partly responsible.

Biotinylated cell surface proteins from a lacritin-responsive cell were incubated with lacritin under conditions of physiological salt. Those that bound lacritin were sequenced by mass spectrometry. Few bound. The most prominent was syndecan-1 (SDC1). In confirmatory pull-down assays, binding was not shared with family members syndecan-2 or syndecan-4, indicating that the protein core (and not the negatively charged heparan sulfate side-chains) was the main site of binding. Further analysis narrowed the site to syndecan-1's N-terminal 51 amino acids, and subsequently to the N-terminal sequence GAGAL that is conserved in syndecan-1's from different species. GAGAL promotes the alpha helicity of lacritin's C-terminal amphipathic alpha helix and likely binds to the hydrophobic face. Syndecan-1 binds many growth factors through its long heparan sulfate side-chains. Yet, long heparan sulfate chains interfere with lacritin binding. Since syndecans are always decorated with heparan sulfate, this means that heparanase must be available to partially or completely cleave off heparan sulfate, allowing lacritin to bind. Indeed, no binding was detected from cells lacking heparanase after siRNA depletion. Binding was restored by spiking in exogenous heparanase or heparitinase. Thus, heparanase regulates lacritin function as an 'on-switch'. Exposed 3-O sulfated groups on heparanase-cleaved heparan sulfate (that likely interacts with the cationic face of lacritin's C-terminal amphipathic alpha helix), and an N-terminal chondroitin sulfate chain (likely also binds to the cationic face) appear to contribute to binding. Point mutagenesis of lacritin has narrowed the ligation site. This novel heparanase mechanism appears at first glance to be poor for ocular health since heparanase release from invading lymphocytes in the corneal stroma is inflammatory. Yet heparanase is a normal secretory product of the corneal epithelium.

Lacritin-dependent mitogenesis is inhibitable by pertussis toxin. The implication is that another key element of lacritin targeting specificity is a G-protein-coupled receptor that would presumably form a cell surface targeting complex with SDC1. Involvement of a G-protein coupled receptor would explain the rapidity of lacritin signaling.

== Function ==
Lacritin is a glycoprotein of the human tear film, and to a lesser extent of saliva, lung lavage and plasma. It is mainly produced by the lacrimal gland. Some lacritin also is produced by the meibomian gland, and also by epithelial cells of the conjunctiva and cornea. The lacritin gene (LACRT) is one of the most transcriptionally regulated genes in the human eye. Functional studies suggest a role in epithelial renewal of some non-germative epithelia. By flowing downstream through ducts, it may generate a 'proliferative field'. Lacritin also promotes secretion (including that of lipocalin-1 and lactoferrin), cell survival and regeneration of the corneal epithelium after wounding. Three times daily topical treatment with C-terminal lacritin synthetic peptide 'Lacripep' (also known as 'N-94/C-6') at a 4 μM concentration regenerated corneal nerves and the ocular surface epithelium in the mouse Aire-/- dry eye model. This raises the possibility that lacritin may have clinical applications in the treatment of dry eye, the most common eye disease. It also may be beneficial in promoting healing after LASIK or PRK surgery. Recent studies suggest that lacritin monomer is differentially down regulated in not only in dry eye, but also in blepharitis.

Lacritin is an LFU prosecretory mitogen and survival factor with a biphasic dose response that is optimal at 1 - 10 nM for human recombinant lacritin on human cells. Higher human lacritin concentrations are optimal on rat or mouse cells or on rabbit eyes. In a recent phase I/II clinical trial, a 22 μM topical dose of 'Lacripep' applied three times daily was effective at two weeks in primary Sjogren's Syndrome patients with an eye dryness score greater than 60, a score indicative of moderate to severe dry eye. Both corneal fluorescein staining and the symptom of burning/stinging were reduced. In keeping with a biphasic dose response, the 44 μM dose was largely ineffective. A biphasic dose response has a bell-shaped curve, with doses lower or higher than the dose optimum less effective. Other mitogens share this property. However, in secretion assays using monkey lacritin on monkey lacrimal acinar cells, the dose response appears to be sigmoidal with increasing lipocalin or lactoferrin secretion through a narrow 0.1, 0.3 and 1 μM dose range. Lacritin flows downstream from the lacrimal gland through ducts onto the eye.

Artificial depletion of lacritin from normal human tears revealed that tears lacking lacritin are unable to promote the survival of ocular surface cells stressed with inflammatory cytokines. Human dry eye tears also lack this activity. However, dry eye tears supplemented with lacritin are fully protective. Similarly, tears artificially depleted of lacritin are deficient in bactericidal activity. The antibody used to deplete lacritin also depletes C-terminal proteoforms. These observations suggest that among all tear proteins, lacritin may be the master protector.

Dry eye tears are subject to premature collapse, as are normal human tears artificially depleted of C-terminal proteoforms. In both cases, stability is largely restored by spiking in synthetic lacritin peptides N-94 or N-94/C-6 as proxy C-terminal proteoforms. Each peptide inserts rapidly into (O-acyl)-omega-hydroxy fatty acid (OAHFA) thought to reside at the aqueous lipid boundary in tears. OAHFA is the only class of tear lipids apparently downregulated in dry eye.

== Signaling ==
Lacritin mitogenic, survival and secretion signaling have been studied.

Lacritin mitogenic signaling follows two pathways:

- Gα_{i} or Gα_{o} → PKCα/PLCγ2 → Ca^{2+} → calcineurin → NFATC1
- Gα_{i} or Gα_{o} → PKCα/PLCγ2/PLD1 → mTOR

Rapid dephosphorylation of PKCα causes it to transiently move from the cytoplasm to the area of the Golgi apparatus and peripheral nucleus. Here, it forms a complex with PKCα and PLCγ2 from which downstream mTOR and NFAT signaling is initiated. The upstream Gα_{i} or Gα_{o} signaling suggests the involvement of a G-protein-coupled receptor (GPCR). A candidate GPCR is under study. Syndecan-1 likely serves as a co-receptor. Binding lacritin may improve its GPCR affinity.

Lacritin survival signaling is observed when cells are stressed. Lacritin promotes survival and homeostasis by transiently stimulating autophagy. The mechanism appears to involve lacritin stimulated acetylation of the transcription factor FOXO3. Acetylated FOXO3 serves as a ligand for the autophagic mediator ATG101. Lacritin also promotes coupling of FOXO1 (that becomes acetylated with stress) with autophagic mediator ATG7. In the absence of lacritin, no coupling is observed. Thus acetylation alone is likely insufficient for FOXO1-ATG7 ligation, unlike an initial claim. Lacritin also restores oxidative phosphorylation and other metabolic events to rescue cells from stress.

Lacritin stimulated secretion of tear proteins lipocalin and lactoferrin from monkey lacrimal acinar cells does not appear to be mediated by Ca^{2+}, unlike the agonist carbachol. When monkey lacrimal acinar cells are stressed with inflammatory cytokines (as occurs in dry eye), carbachol loses its capacity to promote the secretion of lipocalin. However, lacritin stimulates lipocalin secretion even in the presence of stress.

== Bactericidal mechanism ==
The most bactericidal Lacritin C-terminal fragment is N-104. N-104 is not lytic. Instead it targets the outer membrane protein YaiW of gram negative E. coli and P. aeruginosa to facilitate translocation into the periplasm (the region between outer and inner membranes). In the periplasm, N-104 binds two transporters: (i) the ferrous iron transporter FeoB and (ii) the PotH subunit of the polyamine transporter PotFGHI. It thereby inhibits ferrous iron and polyamine uptake. N-104 binds and synergizes with the bactericidal thrombin peptide GKY20. Thrombin is also in human tears.

== Distribution ==
=== Species ===
Genomic sequencing assembled by Ensembl reveals the existence of putative lacritin orthologues in other species. Comparative genomic alignment suggests that horse lacritin is most similar to human lacritin among all non-primate sequences examined. Moreover, it is detectable in horse tears by immunoblotting or by ELISA. Antibodies directed to the C-, but not N-, terminus of human lacritin are most effective - in keeping with the predicted conservation of the C-terminal amphipathic alpha helix necessary for cell targeting.

=== Tissue ===
Tissue distribution has been examined in humans and monkeys. Lacritin is most highly expressed in the lacrimal gland, including the accessory lacrimal gland of Wolfring. Expression is moderate in salivary glands and slight in mammary (cancer but not or rarely normal), and thyroid glands. The salivary gland expression appears to be attributable to a discrete group of unidentified ductal-like cells. Some lacritin was reported in lung bronchoalveolar lavage and plasma. In lacrimal gland, polarized lacrimal acinar cells appear to be the most prolific lacritin producers, as evidenced by strong staining of secretory granules in keeping with lacritin release after carbachol stimulation. Carbachol-dependent release involves PKC and calcium signaling. Some lacritin is produced by the meibomian gland, and also by epithelial cells of the conjunctiva and cornea that together with lacrimal gland comprise much of the lacrimal functional unit (LFU). Viewed collectively, the LFU is the primary source of lacritin in the body, and the eye the main target.

== Disease ==
Dry eye is the most common eye disease, affecting 5 - 6% of the population. Prevalence rises to 6 - 9.8% in postmenopausal women, and as high as 34% in the elderly. Tears lubricate the lid and are important for the refraction of light. Tears also promote epithelial health. Only a small fraction of the estimated 1543 proteins in tears are differentially deficient or upregulated in dry eye. Lacritin monomer is differentially downregulated in mild to severe aqueous deficient dry eye, and in contact lens-related dry eye. In a larger trial, 95% of tears from patients with aqueous deficient dry eye were lacritin monomer deficient. Two studies that did not differentiate monomer from multimer did note any change of lacritin in dry eye. Topical treatment of eyes of dry eye mice (Aire knockout mouse model of dry eye) restored tearing, and suppressed both corneal staining and the size of inflammatory foci in lacrimal glands. Lacritin monomer deficiency in tears of patients with blepharitis was also reported. Blepharitis is an inflammation of the eyelid often associated with dry eye. In climatic droplet keratopathy, N119 appears to be un-glycosylated. Also a normal breast cancer localization reported by some has not been replicated in Unigene (the 'mammary gland' hit is for breast cancer) and gene array studies, but some breast cancers appear to display elevated expression or LACRT gene amplification. iTRAQ analysis of tears from diabetics at different stages of disease detected relatively more lacritin, lysozyme, lipophilin A, lipocalin 1, immunoglobulin lambda chain and lactotransferrin in tears of patients with diabetic retinopathy. The analysis did not distinguish lacritin monomer from polymer, and proposed the application of all as biomarkers. Tear lacritin monomer is substantially elevated in tears of patients suffering from Grades 2 - 3/4 keratonconus. Tear lacritin monomer is barely detectable in the initial stage of infection by Fusarium solani in fungal keratitis. Also down regulated are tear lipocalin-1 and cystatin S. Fungal keratitis accounts for half of all corneal ulcers in Africa and India - the primary source of blindness in these countries. Phase II clinical trial of 'Lacripep™ in Subjects With Dry Eye Associated With Primary Sjögren's Syndrome' (NCT03226444) is complete with strong efficacy and excellent toleration demonstrated. It was also apparent that further dose optimization was necessary to lower the dose into the dose optimum range of the bell-shaped dose response. Lacripep™ is lacritin synthetic peptide 'N-94/C-6'.
