= Bivatuzumab mertansine =

Chemical compound

Monoclonal antibody
- Type: Whole antibody
- Source: Humanized (from mouse)
- Target: CD44 v6

Clinical data
- ATC code: none

Identifiers
- ChemSpider: none

Bivatuzumab mertansine is a combination of bivatuzumab, a humanized monoclonal antibody, and mertansine, a cytotoxic agent. It is designed for the treatment of squamous cell carcinoma.
