= Lorvotuzumab mertansine =

Chemical compound

Monoclonal antibody
- Type: Whole antibody
- Source: Humanized
- Target: CD56

Clinical data
- ATC code: none

Identifiers
- CAS Number: 1008106-64-6
- ChemSpider: none
- UNII: 0IVD6ASY0W
- KEGG: D09927

Lorvotuzumab mertansine (IMGN901) is an antibody-drug conjugate. It comprises the CD56-binding antibody, lorvotuzumab (huN901), with a maytansinoid cell-killing agent, DM1, attached using a disulfide linker, SPP. (When DM1 is attached to an antibody with the SPP linker, it is mertansine; when it is attached with the thioether linker, SMCC, it is emtansine.)

Lorvotuzumab mertansine is an experimental agent created for the treatment of CD56 positive cancers (e.g. small-cell lung cancer, ovarian cancer).

It has been granted Orphan drug status for Merkel cell carcinoma.

It has reported encouraging Phase II results for small-cell lung cancer.
