= Bivatuzumab =

Chemical compound

Monoclonal antibody
- Type: Whole antibody
- Source: Humanized (from mouse)
- Target: CD44 v6

Clinical data
- ATC code: none

Identifiers
- CAS Number: 214559-60-1
- DrugBank: DB06550
- ChemSpider: none
- UNII: 0A0Z1IJN86

Bivatuzumab (previously BIWA 4) is a humanized monoclonal antibody against CD44 v6.

It is officially described as "immunoglobulin G1 (human-mouse monoclonal BIWA4 γ1-chain anti-human antigen CD44v6), disulfide with human-mouse monoclonal BIWA4 κ-chain, dimer". Prior to 2002 it was described as targeting CD44 v8.

It has been chemically linked to various radioisotopes for use in radiotherapy for, e.g. inoperable recurrent or metastatic head and neck cancer.

It has also been linked to a cytotoxic drug mertansine to form bivatuzumab mertansine.
