= HPSE2 =

Protein found in humans

Identifiers
- Aliases: HPSE2, HPA2, HPR2, UFS, UFS1, heparanase 2 (inactive)
- External IDs: OMIM: 613469; MGI: 2685814; GeneCards: HPSE2

Gene location (Human)
Chr.	Chromosome 10 (human)
Band	10q24.2	Start	98,457,077 bp
Band	10q24.2	End	99,235,862 bp

Gene location (Mouse)
Chr.	Chromosome 19 (mouse)
Band	19|19 C3	Start	42,774,978 bp
Band	19|19 C3	End	43,376,794 bp
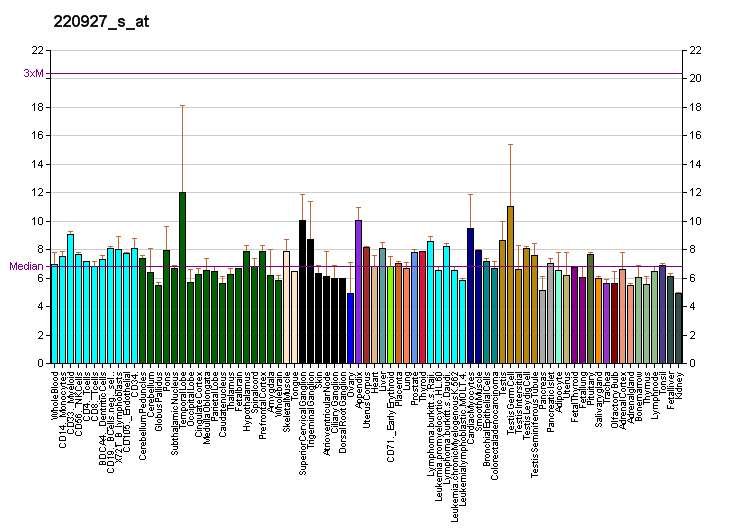
RNA expression pattern
Bgee	Human / Mouse (ortholog); Top expressed in: Achilles tendon; canal of the cervix; gastric mucosa; ectocervix; popliteal artery; tibial arteries; hypothalamus; caudate nucleus; putamen; C1 segment / Top expressed in: genital tubercle; pineal gland; spermatid; zygote; migratory enteric neural crest cell; hand; urinary bladder; lobe of prostate; lip; Gonadal ridge; More reference expression data
BioGPS	More reference expression data
Gene ontology
Molecular function	heparan sulfate proteoglycan binding; heparanase activity; hydrolase activity, acting on glycosyl bonds
Cellular component	extracellular region; plasma membrane; intracellular anatomical structure; membrane; extracellular matrix
Biological process	glycosaminoglycan catabolic process; positive regulation of cell population proliferation; extracellular matrix organization; biological process
Sources:Amigo / QuickGO
Orthologs
Databases	NCBI: entry; OMA: entry
Species	Human	Mouse
Entrez	60495	545291
Ensembl	ENSG00000172987	ENSMUSG00000074852
UniProt	Q8WWQ2	B2RY83
RefSeq (mRNA)	NM_001166244; NM_001166245; NM_001166246; NM_021828	NM_001081257
RefSeq (protein)	NP_001159716; NP_001159717; NP_001159718; NP_068600	NP_001074726
Location (UCSC)	Chr 10: 98.46 – 99.24 Mb	Chr 19: 42.77 – 43.38 Mb
PubMed search
- Wikidata
View/Edit Human	View/Edit Mouse

Inactive heparanase-2 is a protein that in humans is encoded by the HPSE2 gene. This protein is able to bind to heparin and heparan sulfate, but unlike its paralog HPSE, does not have heparanase activity. Instead, HPSE2 inhibits HPSE activity, possibly through competition for substrate.

Pathogenic mutations are associated with urofacial syndrome I (UFS1).
