= Cantuzumab ravtansine =

Chemical compound

Monoclonal antibody
- Type: Whole antibody
- Source: Humanized (from mouse)
- Target: MUC1

Clinical data
- ATC code: none

Identifiers
- CAS Number: 868747-45-9
- ChemSpider: none
- UNII: RNQ8JQ4R9P
- KEGG: D10454

Cantuzumab ravtansine (huC242-SPDB-DM4) is an antibody-drug conjugate designed for the treatment of cancers. The humanized monoclonal antibody cantuzumab (huC242) is linked to a cytotoxic agent, ravtansine (DM4). It uses a more hindered disulfide linkage than cantuzumab mertansine.

== See also ==
- Cantuzumab mertansine
- ImmunoGen Inc, developer of DM4 based drugs
