= Trastuzumab emtansine =

Pharmaceutical drug

Monoclonal antibody
- Type: Whole antibody
- Source: Humanized (from mouse)

Clinical data
- Trade names: Kadcyla
- Other names: ado-trastuzumab emtansine, trastuzumab-DM1, T-DM1
- AHFS/Drugs.com: Monograph
- MedlinePlus: a613031
- License data: EU EMA: by INN; US DailyMed: Trastuzumab_emtansine
- Pregnancy category: AU: D
- Routes of administration: Intravenous infusion
- Drug class: Antineoplastic agent
- ATC code: L01FD03 (WHO)

Legal status
- Legal status: AU: S4 (Prescription only); UK: POM (Prescription only); US: ℞-only; EU: Rx-only

Pharmacokinetic data
- Bioavailability: N/A
- Protein binding: 93% (in vitro)
- Metabolism: Liver (CYP3A4/3A5-mediated)
- Elimination half-life: 4 days

Identifiers
- CAS Number: 1018448-65-1
- PubChem SID: 347910224
- DrugBank: DB05773
- ChemSpider: none
- UNII: SE2KH7T06F
- KEGG: D09980
- ChEMBL: ChEMBL1743082

Chemical and physical data
- Formula: C_{6448}H_{9948}N_{1720}O_{2012}S_{44}·(C_{47}H_{62}ClN_{4}O_{13}S)_{n}
- Molar mass: 148.5 kg/mol

Trastuzumab emtansine, sold under the brand name Kadcyla, is an antibody-drug conjugate consisting of the humanized monoclonal antibody trastuzumab (Herceptin) covalently linked to the cytotoxic agent DM1. Trastuzumab alone stops growth of cancer cells by binding to the HER2 receptor, whereas trastuzumab emtansine undergoes receptor-mediated internalization into cells, is catabolized in lysosomes where DM1-containing catabolites are released and subsequently bind tubulin to cause mitotic arrest and cell death. Trastuzumab binding to HER2 prevents homodimerization or heterodimerization (HER2/HER3) of the receptor, ultimately inhibiting the activation of MAPK and PI3K/AKT cellular signalling pathways. Because the monoclonal antibody targets HER2, and HER2 is only over-expressed in cancer cells, the conjugate delivers the cytotoxic agent DM1 specifically to tumor cells. The conjugate is abbreviated T-DM1.

In the EMILIA clinical trial of women with advanced HER2 positive breast cancer who were already resistant to trastuzumab alone, it improved median overall survival by 5.8 months (30.9 months vs. 25.1 months) compared to the combination of lapatinib and capecitabine. Based on that trial, the U.S. Food and Drug Administration (FDA) approved marketing on 22 February 2013.

Trastuzumab emtansine was developed by Genentech, and is manufactured by Lonza.

== Medical uses ==
In the United States, trastuzumab emtansine was approved specifically for treatment of HER2-positive metastatic breast cancer (mBC) in patients who have been treated previously with trastuzumab and a taxane (paclitaxel or docetaxel), and who have already been treated for mBC or developed tumor recurrence within six months of adjuvant therapy.

Approval was based on the EMILIA study, a phase III clinical trial that compared trastuzumab emtansine versus capecitabine (Xeloda) plus lapatinib (Tykerb) in 991 people with unresectable, locally advanced or metastatic HER2-positive breast cancer who had previously been treated with trastuzumab and taxane chemotherapy. This trial showed improved progression-free survival in patients treated with trastuzumab emtansine (median 9.6 vs. 6.4 months), along with improved overall survival (median 30.9 vs. 25.1 months) and safety.

== Adverse effects ==
During clinical trials, the most common adverse effects of trastuzumab emtansine were fatigue, nausea, musculoskeletal pain, thrombocytopenia (low platelet counts), headache, increased liver enzyme levels, and constipation.

Severe adverse events identified during the EMILIA trial included hepatotoxicity (liver damage), including rare cases of liver failure, hepatic encephalopathy, and nodular regenerative hyperplasia; heart damage (dysfunction of the left ventricle); interstitial lung disease, including acute interstitial pneumonitis; thrombocytopenia; and peripheral neuropathy. Overall, trastuzumab emtansine was better tolerated than the control treatment, a combination of lapatinib (Tykerb) and capecitabine (Xeloda), with 43% of patients in the trastuzumab emtansine group experiencing severe toxic effects, versus 59% of those who received lapatinib/capecitabine; furthermore, fewer patients had to stop treatment due to adverse effects than with lapatinib or capecitabine. Anemia, low platelet counts, and peripheral neuropathy were more common among patients who received trastuzumab emtansine, whereas heart damage and gastrointestinal effects, such as vomiting, diarrhea, and stomatitis, were more common with lapatinib/capecitabine.

In the United States, trastuzumab emtansine carries black box warnings for liver toxicity, heart damage (reduction in left ventricular ejection fraction), and fetal harm if given to pregnant women.

== Chemical properties ==
Schematic representation of trastuzumab emtansine. The maytansine skeleton is shown in black at left. The thioether group that makes mertansine is shown in red. The linker group that makes emtansine is shown in blue at right, bound to the amino group (HN–) of a lysine residue in the trastuzumab molecule (–mab).

Trastuzumab emtansine is an antibody-drug conjugate (ADC), a combination between a monoclonal antibody and a small-molecule drug. Each molecule of trastuzumab emtansine consists of a single trastuzumab molecule with several molecules of DM1, a cytotoxic maytansinoid, attached. SMCC, or succinimidyl trans-4-(maleimidylmethyl)cyclohexane-1-carboxylate, is a heterobifunctional crosslinker, a type of chemical reagent that contains two reactive functional groups, a succinimide ester and a maleimide. The succinimide group of SMCC reacts with the free amino group of a lysine residue in the trastuzumab molecule and the maleimide moiety of SMCC links to the free sulfhydryl group of DM1, forming a covalent bond between the antibody and the DM1. Each trastuzumab molecule may be linked to zero to eight DM1 molecules (3.5 on average). DM1 binds at plus ends of cellular microtubules and thereby inhibits cell division in the target tumor cells.

== History ==
In 2013, trastuzumab emtansine was approved in the United States for the treatment of adults with HER2-positive, metastatic breast cancer who previously received trastuzumab and a taxane, separately or in combination.

Referred to as T-DM1 during clinical research, trastuzumab emtansine was reviewed under the FDA's priority review program.

The safety and effectiveness of trastuzumab emtansine were evaluated in a clinical study of 991 patients randomly assigned to receive trastuzumab emtansine or lapatinib plus capecitabine, another chemotherapy drug. Patients received treatment until either the cancer progressed or the side effects became intolerable. The study was designed to measure progression-free survival, the length of time patients lived without the cancer progressing, and overall survival, the length of time patients lived before death.

Results showed that patients treated with trastuzumab emtansine had a median progression-free survival of 9.6 months compared to 6.4 months in patients treated with lapatinib plus capecitabine. The median overall survival was 30.9 months in the trastuzumab emtansine group and 25.1 months in the lapatinib plus capecitabine group.

The U.S. Food and Drug Administration (FDA) approved trastuzumab emtansine in February 2013, and granted the application for Kadcyla to Genentech. The FDA granted the application for trastuzumab emtansine priority review and breakthrough therapy designations.

In 2013, trastuzumab emtansine was approved in the UK, and the EU.

In 2019, trastuzumab emtansine was approved in the United States for the adjuvant treatment of patients with HER2-positive early breast cancer (EBC) who have residual invasive disease after neoadjuvant taxane and trastuzumab-based treatment.

Approval was based on KATHERINE (NCT01772472), a randomized, multicenter, open-label trial of 1486 patients with HER2-positive EBC. Breast tumor samples were required to demonstrate HER2 overexpression defined as 3+ IHC or ISH amplification ratio ≥ 2.0 determined at a central laboratory using Ventana's PATHWAY anti-HER2-/neu (4B5) Rabbit Monoclonal Primary Antibody or INFORM HER2 Dual ISH DNA Probe Cocktail assays. Patients were required to have had neoadjuvant taxane and trastuzumab-based therapy with residual invasive tumor in the breast and/or axillary lymph nodes. Patients received radiotherapy and/or hormonal therapy concurrent with study treatment per local guidelines. Patients were randomized (1:1) to receive trastuzumab emtansine 3.6 mg/kg intravenously or trastuzumab 6 mg/kg intravenously on day 1 of a 21-day cycle for 14 cycles.

The trial's primary endpoint was invasive disease-free survival (IDFS), defined as the time from the date of randomization to first occurrence of ipsilateral invasive breast tumor recurrence, ipsilateral local or regional invasive breast cancer recurrence, distant recurrence, contralateral invasive breast cancer, or death from any cause. After a median follow-up of 40 months, the trial demonstrated a statistically significant improvement in IDFS in patients who received trastuzumab emtansine compared with those who received trastuzumab (HR 0.50; 95% CI: 0.39, 0.64; p<0.0001). Overall survival data were not mature at the time of the IDFS analysis.

== Society and culture ==
=== Economics ===
In the UK, trastuzumab emtansine was not recommended for use by the National Health Service by advisory body NICE, reportedly because an acceptable pricing agreement could not be reached with Roche. Originally it cost £5,900 a month. and NICE estimated it cost £166,000 per QALY (well over the usual maximum). It has been funded by the English NHS Cancer Drugs Fund but in January 2015 it was proposed to remove it from the approved list. After a secret discount was agreed by Roche the Cancer Drugs Fund will continue to fund it.

In June 2017, the NHS Confederation and NHS Chief Executive Simon Stevens announced that the NHS would be offering trastuzumab emtansine to a limited number of women after striking a deal with Roche on the price.

=== Names ===
In 2013, trastuzumab emtansine was approved in the United States with the generic name "ado-trastuzumab emtansine", rather than the original United States Adopted Name (USAN) issued in 2009, "trastuzumab emtansine". Trastuzumab is the anti-HER2 antibody; emtansine refers to the linker-drug (SMCC-DM1). The "ado-" prefix was added at the request of the FDA to help prevent dispensing errors. During preclinical development and clinical trials, the drug was also known as trastuzumab-DM1 or trastuzumab-MCC-DM1 (after the codename for emtansine), both abbreviated T-DM1, and by the codename PRO132365.

== Research ==
=== Clinical trials ===
Since 2013 there have been some more clinical trials:

- First line treatment for metastatic breast cancer: the MARIANNE study compares taxane (docetaxel or paclitaxel) plus trastuzumab vs T-DM1 vs T-DM1 plus pertuzumab as first-line treatment for people with HER2 positive unresectable locally advanced or metastatic breast cancer; On 19 December 2014, Roche reported the results of the MARIANNE study. Neither Kadcyla-containing treatment significantly improved progression-free survival compared to Herceptin and chemotherapy.
- a phase III trial for HER2+ gastric cancer compares T-DM1 to physician's choice of taxane (docetaxel or paclitaxel). On 22 October 2015, Roche and co-developer ImmunoGen disclosed that trastuzumab emtansine had failed to meet its primary endpoint in the Phase II/III GATSBY trial investigating the second line treatment of HER2-positive advanced gastric cancer.
- the TH3RESA study is comparing T-DM1 vs treatment of physician's choice for people with HER2 positive metastatic breast cancer previously treated with trastuzumab and lapatinib. Interim results for TH3RESA suggest a doubling of progression-free survival from three months to six months.
