= Rhizoxin =

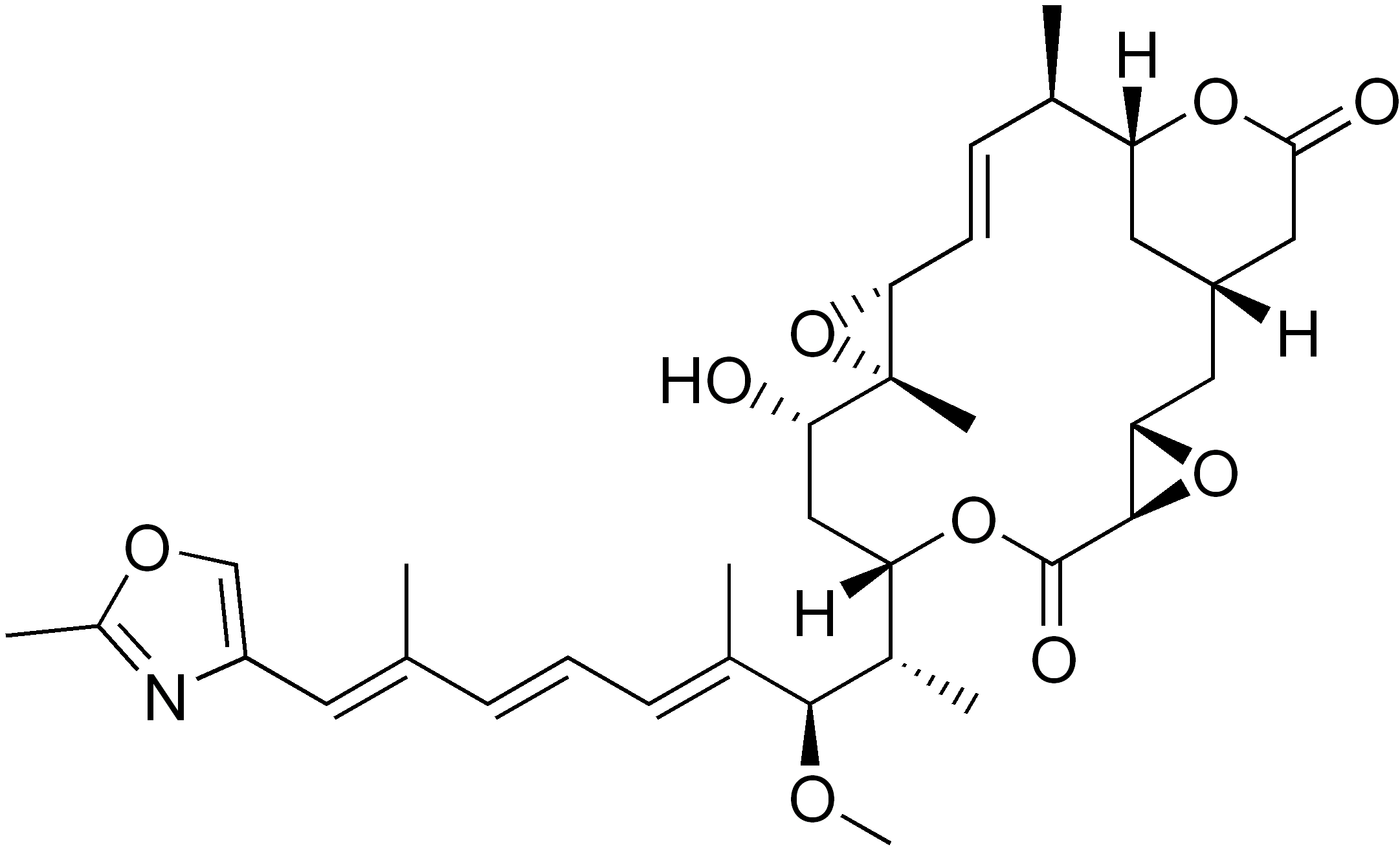

Identifiers
CAS Number	90996-54-6
3D model (JSmol)	Interactive image
ChEBI	CHEBI:72590
ChEMBL	ChEMBL379989
ChemSpider	10405026
PubChem CID	11969567
UNII	C1V1Y784E4
CompTox Dashboard (EPA)	DTXSID20897515
- InChI: InChI=1S/C35H47NO9/c1-19(13-25-18-41-23(5)36-25)9-8-10-21(3)32(40-7)22(4)27-17-29(37)35(6)30(45-35)12-11-20(2)26-14-24(16-31(38)42-26)15-28-33(43-28)34(39)44-27/h8-13,18,20,22,24,26-30,32-33,37H,14-17H2,1-7H3/b9-8+,12-11+,19-13+,21-10+/t20-,22+,24+,26-,27+,28+,29+,30-,32+,33-,35-/m1/s1 Key: OWPCHSCAPHNHAV-QIPOKPRISA-N
- SMILES: O=C1C[C@@](C[C@H]3[C@H]2O3)([H])C[C@@]([C@H](C)/C=C/[C@@H](O4)[C@]4(C)[C@@H](O)C[C@]([C@H](C)[C@@H](OC)/C(C)=C/C=C/C(C)=C/C5=COC(C)=N5)([H])OC2=O)([H])O1

Properties
Chemical formula	C_{35}H_{47}NO_{9}
Molar mass	625.749 g/mol
- Except where otherwise noted, data are given for materials in their standard state (at 25 °C [77 °F], 100 kPa). verify (what is ?) Infobox references

Rhizoxin is an antimitotic agent with anti-tumor activity. It is isolated from the fungus Rhizopus microsporus which causes rice seedling blight.

== Biosynthesis ==
Rhizoxin is biosynthesised by Paraburkholderia rhizoxinica, a bacterial endosymbiont of the fungus Rhizopus microsporus. It is one of a large group of rhizoxin-like compounds produced by the bacteria. The bacterial endosymbiont can be grown independently in culture. This may allow easy harvesting of rhizoxin and the related compounds avoiding total chemical synthesis, although total chemical synthesis is possible.

== Cytotoxic function ==
Rhizoxin binds beta tubulin in eukaryotic cells disrupting microtubule formation. This, in turn, prevents formation of the mitotic spindle inhibiting cell division. Additionally rhizoxin can depolymerise assembled microtubules. The function of rhizoxin is similar to Vinca alkaloids.

Rhizoxin has undergone clinical trials as an anti-cancer drug although it did not reach later stages of clinical trials due to low activity in vivo. Related compounds to rhizoxin have improved biological activity (E.G Mertansine) .

== Structure ==
Rhizoxin is a 16-membered lactone ring connected to an oxazole ring by a long unsaturated chain.
