= Syndecan 1 =

Protein which in humans is encoded by the SDC1 gene

SDC1
- Immunohistochemistry for CD138 showing plasma cells in a case of chronic deciduitis. CD138 staining in plasma cells is primarily membranous, seen as brown stain in this case, but the rim can look discontinuous or granular, and some cells also show cytoplasmic or Golgi staining.

Identifiers
- Aliases: SDC1, CD138, SDC, SYND1, syndecan, syndecan 1
- External IDs: OMIM: 186355; MGI: 1349162; GeneCards: SDC1
Available structures
PDB	Ortholog search: PDBe RCSB
PDB	List of PDB id codes 4GVC, 4GVD

Gene location (Human)
Chr.	Chromosome 2 (human)
Band	2p24.1	Start	20,200,797 bp
Band	2p24.1	End	20,225,433 bp

Gene location (Mouse)
Chr.	Chromosome 12 (mouse)
Band	12 A1.1|12 3.94 cM	Start	8,821,323 bp
Band	12 A1.1|12 3.94 cM	End	8,843,715 bp
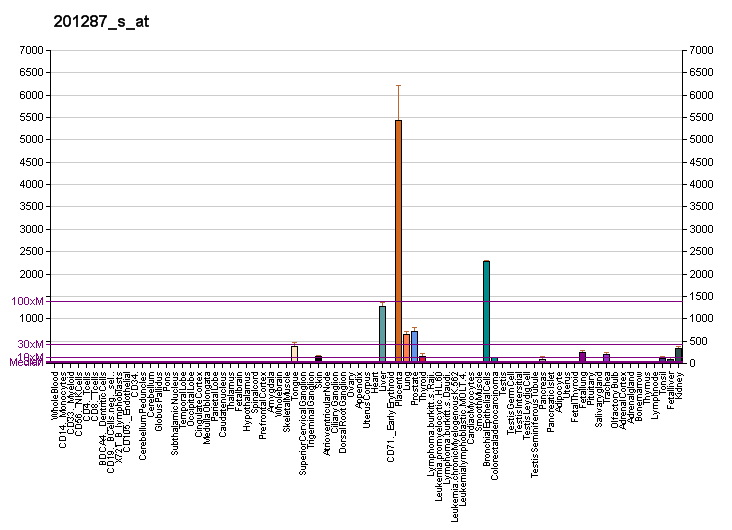

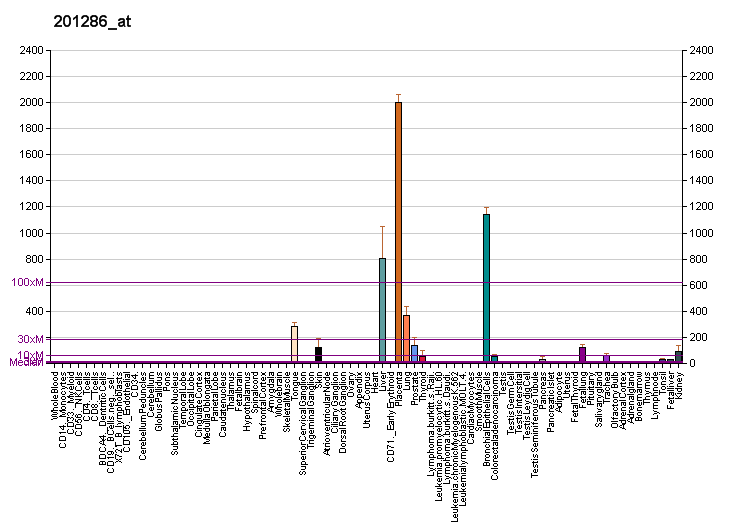
RNA expression pattern
Bgee	Human / Mouse (ortholog); Top expressed in: skin of abdomen; mucosa of pharynx; right lobe of liver; skin of limb; skin of leg; gums; skin of arm; skin of thigh; gingival epithelium; vulva / Top expressed in: cumulus cell; transitional epithelium of urinary bladder; molar; conjunctival fornix; skin of abdomen; lip; hair follicle; external carotid artery; condyle; skin of external ear; More reference expression data
BioGPS	More reference expression data
Gene ontology
Molecular function	protein C-terminus binding; protein binding; identical protein binding
Cellular component	lysosomal lumen; extracellular exosome; extracellular region; integral component of membrane; Golgi lumen; integral component of plasma membrane; membrane; cell surface; plasma membrane; external side of plasma membrane; protein-containing complex
Biological process	glycosaminoglycan catabolic process; canonical Wnt signaling pathway; wound healing; response to calcium ion; odontogenesis; glycosaminoglycan biosynthetic process; ureteric bud development; response to cAMP; positive regulation of exosomal secretion; Sertoli cell development; striated muscle cell development; positive regulation of extracellular exosome assembly; retinoid metabolic process; response to glucocorticoid; response to toxic substance; response to organic substance; response to hydrogen peroxide; glycosaminoglycan metabolic process; inflammatory response; myoblast development; leukocyte migration; cell migration; cytokine-mediated signaling pathway
Sources:Amigo / QuickGO
Orthologs
Databases	NCBI: entry; OMA: entry
Species	Human	Mouse
Entrez	6382	20969
Ensembl	ENSG00000115884	ENSMUSG00000020592
UniProt	P18827	P18828
RefSeq (mRNA)	NM_001006946; NM_002997	NM_011519
RefSeq (protein)	NP_001006947; NP_002988	NP_035649
Location (UCSC)	Chr 2: 20.2 – 20.23 Mb	Chr 12: 8.82 – 8.84 Mb
PubMed search
- Wikidata
View/Edit Human	View/Edit Mouse

Syndecan 1 is a protein which in humans is encoded by the SDC1 gene. The protein is a transmembrane (type I) heparan sulfate proteoglycan and is a member of the syndecan proteoglycan family. The syndecan-1 protein functions as an integral membrane protein and participates in cell proliferation, cell migration and cell-matrix interactions via its receptor for extracellular matrix proteins. Syndecan-1 is a sponge for growth factors and chemokines, with binding largely via heparan sulfate chains. The syndecans mediate cell binding, cell signaling, and cytoskeletal organization and syndecan receptors are required for internalization of the HIV-1 tat protein.

Altered syndecan-1 expression has been detected in several different tumor types. Syndecan 1 can be a marker for plasma cells.

== Structure ==
The syndecan-1 core protein consists of an extracellular domain which can be substituted with heparan sulfate and chondroitin sulfate glycosaminoglycan chains, a highly conserved transmembrane domain, and a highly conserved cytoplasmic domain, which contains two constant regions that are separated by a variable region. The extracellular domain can be cleaved (shed) from the cell surface at a juxtamembrane site, converting the membrane-bound proteoglycan into a paracrine effector molecule with roles in wound repair and invasive growth of cancer cells.

An exception is the prosecretory mitogen lacritin that binds syndecan-1 only after heparanase modification. Binding utilizes an enzyme-regulated 'off-on' switch in which active epithelial heparanase (HPSE) cleaves off heparan sulfate to expose a binding site in the N-terminal region of syndecan-1's core protein. Three SDC1 elements are required. (1) The heparanase-exposed hydrophobic sequence GAGAL that promotes the alpha helicity of lacritin's C-terminal amphipathic alpha helix form and likely binds to the hydrophobic face. (2) Heparanase-cleaved heparan sulfate that is 3-O sulfated. This likely interacts with the cationic face of lacritin's C-terminal amphipathic alpha helix. (3) An N-terminal chondroitin sulfate chain that also likely binds to the cationic face. Point mutagenesis of lacritin has narrowed the ligation site.

While several transcript variants may exist for this gene, the full-length natures of only two have been described to date. These two represent the major variants of this gene and encode the same protein.

== Inflammation ==
Syndecan-1 deficient mice show increased inflammation, which was attributed to an increased ICAM-1 and heparan sulfate-dependent recruitment of leukocytes (including neutrophils and dendritic cells) to the inflamed endothelium. This increase results in higher inflammatory responses and tissue damage in experimental models of contact dermatitis, inflammation of the kidney, myocardial infarction, inflammatory bowel disease and experimental autoimmune encephalomyelitis In experimental colitis-induced colon carcinoma, syndecan-1 deficiency promotes tumor growth in an IL-6 / STAT-signaling-dependent manner.

== Clinical significance ==
Altered syndecan-1 expression has been detected in several different tumor types. In breast cancer, syndecan-1 is up regulated and contributes to the cancer stem cell phenotype, which is linked to increased resistance to chemotherapy and radiation therapy

It is a specific antigen on multiple myeloma cells. Indatuximab ravtansine targets this protein.

== Application ==
It is a useful marker for plasma cells, but only if the cells tested are already known to be derived from blood. For plasma cells, it usually stains intensely membranous, with or without associated diffuse weak cytoplasmic and/or Golgi staining. Few cases show cytoplasmic granular staining, with or without associated Golgi staining.
