= CD44 =

Cell-surface glycoprotein

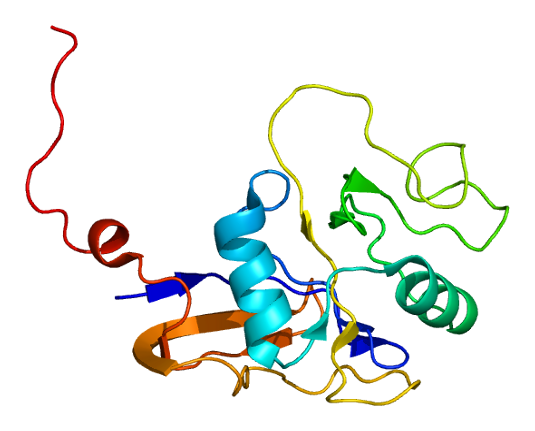

Identifiers
- Aliases: CD44, CDW44, CSPG8, ECMR-III, HCELL, HUTCH-I, IN, LHR, MC56, MDU2, MDU3, MIC4, Pgp1, CD44 molecule (Indian blood group)
- External IDs: OMIM: 107269; MGI: 88338; GeneCards: CD44
Available structures
PDB	Ortholog search: PDBe RCSB
PDB	List of PDB id codes 1POZ, 1UUH, 2I83, 4PZ3, 4PZ4

Gene location (Human)
Chr.	Chromosome 11 (human)
Band	11p13	Start	35,138,882 bp
Band	11p13	End	35,232,402 bp

Gene location (Mouse)
Chr.	Chromosome 2 (mouse)
Band	2 E2|2 54.13 cM	Start	102,641,486 bp
Band	2 E2|2 54.13 cM	End	102,732,010 bp
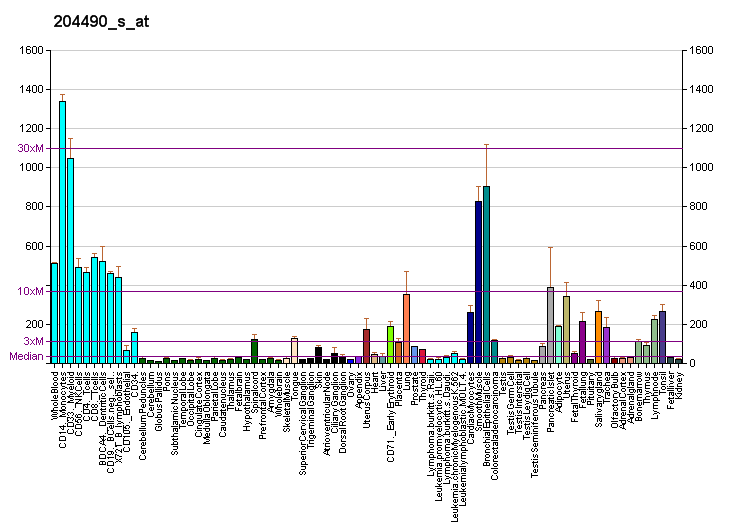

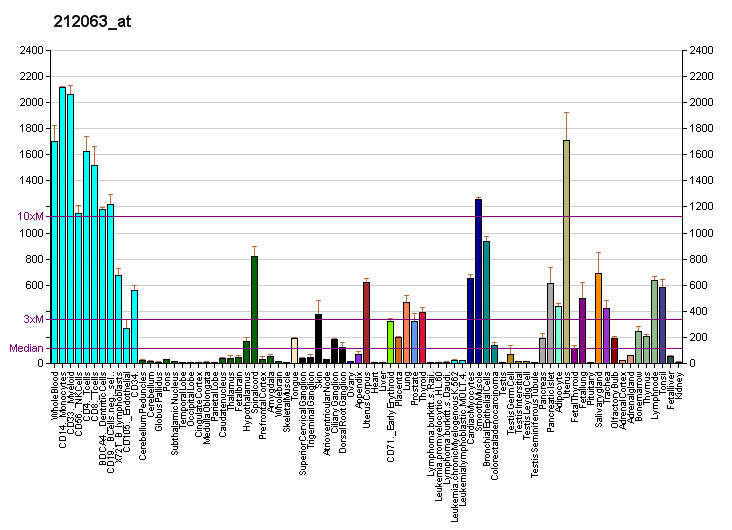

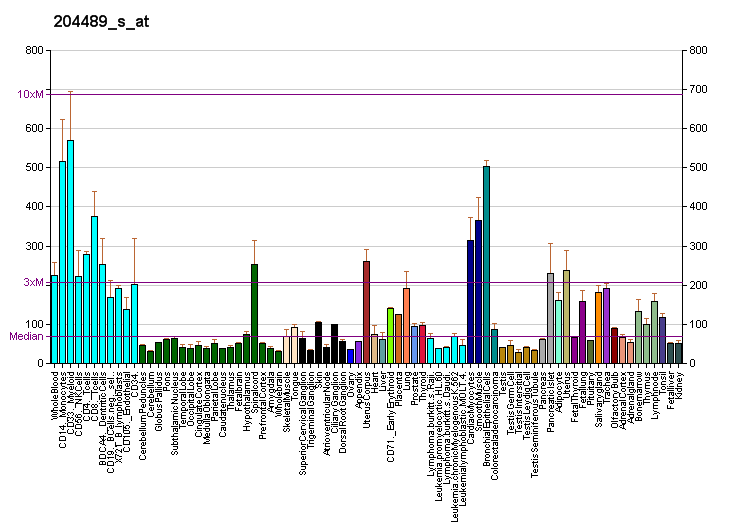
RNA expression pattern
Bgee	Human / Mouse (ortholog); Top expressed in: parotid gland; stromal cell of endometrium; vulva; gingival epithelium; skin of thigh; human penis; skin of abdomen; Achilles tendon; skin of hip; islet of Langerhans / Top expressed in: molar; granulocyte; calvaria; dermis; submandibular gland; epithelium of lens; tibiofemoral joint; parotid gland; endothelial cell of lymphatic vessel; body of femur; More reference expression data
BioGPS	More reference expression data
Gene ontology
Molecular function	collagen binding; protein binding; hyaluronic acid binding; cytokine receptor activity; transmembrane signaling receptor activity
Cellular component	integral component of membrane; Golgi apparatus; macrophage migration inhibitory factor receptor complex; membrane; focal adhesion; plasma membrane; integral component of plasma membrane; cell surface; extracellular exosome; cytosol; secretory granule membrane; apical plasma membrane; lamellipodium membrane; cell projection; microvillus; basolateral plasma membrane
Biological process	negative regulation of cysteine-type endopeptidase activity involved in apoptotic process; monocyte aggregation; positive regulation of heterotypic cell-cell adhesion; hyaluronan catabolic process; negative regulation of intrinsic apoptotic signaling pathway in response to DNA damage by p53 class mediator; interferon-gamma-mediated signaling pathway; extracellular matrix disassembly; extracellular matrix organization; negative regulation of apoptotic process; cellular response to fibroblast growth factor stimulus; positive regulation of peptidyl-serine phosphorylation; cartilage development; cell adhesion; negative regulation of DNA damage response, signal transduction by p53 class mediator; positive regulation of ERK1 and ERK2 cascade; positive regulation of peptidyl-tyrosine phosphorylation; cell-matrix adhesion; positive regulation of monocyte aggregation; leukocyte migration; neutrophil degranulation; wound healing, spreading of cells; regulation of lamellipodium morphogenesis; cell-cell adhesion; inflammatory response; cell migration; T cell activation; positive regulation of kinase activity
Sources:Amigo / QuickGO
Orthologs
Databases	NCBI: entry; OMA: entry
Species	Human	Mouse
Entrez	960	12505
Ensembl	ENSG00000026508	ENSMUSG00000005087
UniProt	P16070	P15379
RefSeq (mRNA)	NM_000610; NM_001001389; NM_001001390; NM_001001391; NM_001001392 NM_001202555; NM_001202556; NM_001202557	NM_001039150; NM_001039151; NM_001177785; NM_001177786; NM_001177787 NM_009851
RefSeq (protein)	NP_000601; NP_001001389; NP_001001390; NP_001001391; NP_001001392 NP_001189484; NP_001189485; NP_001189486	NP_001034239; NP_001034240; NP_001171256; NP_001171257; NP_001171258 NP_033981
Location (UCSC)	Chr 11: 35.14 – 35.23 Mb	Chr 2: 102.64 – 102.73 Mb
PubMed search
- Wikidata
View/Edit Human	View/Edit Mouse

The CD44 antigen is a cell-surface glycoprotein involved in cell–cell interactions, cell adhesion and migration. In humans, the CD44 antigen is encoded by the CD44 gene on chromosome 11. CD44 has been referred to as HCAM (homing cell adhesion molecule), Pgp-1 (phagocytic glycoprotein-1), Hermes antigen, lymphocyte homing receptor, ECM-III, and HUTCH-1.

== Tissue distribution and isoforms ==
CD44 is expressed in a large number of mammalian cell types. The standard isoform, designated CD44s, comprising exons 1–5 and 16–20 is expressed in most cell types. CD44 splice variants containing variable exons are designated CD44v. Some epithelial cells also express a larger isoform (CD44E), which includes exons v8–10.

== Function ==
CD44 participates in a wide variety of cellular functions including lymphocyte activation, recirculation and homing, hematopoiesis, and tumor metastasis.

CD44 is a receptor for hyaluronic acid and internalizes metals bound to hyaluronic acid and can also interact with other ligands, such as osteopontin, collagens, and matrix metalloproteinases (MMPs). CD44 function is controlled by its posttranslational modifications. One critical modification involves discrete sialofucosylations rendering the selectin-binding glycoform of CD44 called HCELL (for Hematopoietic Cell E-selectin/L-selectin Ligand). (see below)

Transcripts for this gene undergo complex alternative splicing that results in many functionally distinct isoforms; however, the full length nature of some of these variants has not been determined. Alternative splicing is the basis for the structural and functional diversity of this protein, and may be related to tumor metastasis. Splice variants of CD44 on colon cancer cells display sialofucosylated HCELL glycoforms that serve as P-, L-, and E-selectin ligands and fibrin, but not fibrinogen, receptors under hemodynamic flow conditions pertinent to the process of cancer metastasis.

CD44 gene transcription is at least in part activated by beta-catenin and Wnt signalling (also linked to tumour development).

=== HCELL ===
HCELL (Hematopoietic Cell E-/L-selectin Ligand) is a specialized glycoform of the CD44 protein that functions as a critical adhesion molecule in hematopoietic and immune processes. It is distinguished by unique post-translational modifications that enable potent binding to E-selectin and L-selectin, guiding cell migration and homing.

The HCELL glycoform was originally discovered on human hematopoietic stem cells and leukemic blasts, and was subsequently identified on cancer cells. HCELL functions as a "bone homing receptor", directing migration of human hematopoietic stem cells and mesenchymal stem cells to bone marrow. Ex vivo glycan engineering of the surface of live cells has been used to enforce HCELL expression on any cell that expresses CD44. CD44 glycosylation also directly controls its binding capacity to fibrin and immobilized fibrinogen.

== Clinical significance ==
The protein is a determinant for the Indian blood group system.

- CD44, along with CD25, is used to track early T cell development in the thymus.
- CD44 expression is an indicative marker for effector-memory T-cells. Memory cell proliferation (activation) can also be assayed in vitro with CFSE chemical tagging.
- CD44 is a biomarker of cancer stem cells, and these cells can potentially be targeted with novel therapies.

In addition, variations in CD44 are reported as cell surface markers for some breast and prostate cancer stem cells. In breast cancer research CD44+/CD24- expression is commonly used as a marker for breast CSCs and is used to sort breast cancer cells into a population enriched in cells with stem-like characteristics and has been seen as an indicator of increased survival time in epithelial ovarian cancer patients.

Endometrial cells in women with endometriosis demonstrate increased expression of splice variants of CD44, and increased adherence to peritoneal cells.

CD44 variant isoforms are also relevant to the progression of head and neck squamous cell carcinoma.

Monoclonal antibodies against CD44 variants include bivatuzumab for v6.

== CD44 in cancer ==
CD44 is a multistructural and multifunctional cell surface molecule involved in cell proliferation, cell differentiation, cell migration, angiogenesis, presentation of cytokines, chemokines, and growth factors to the corresponding receptors, and docking of proteases at the cell membrane, as well as in signaling for cell survival. All these biological properties are essential to the physiological activities of normal cells, but they are also associated with the pathologic activities of cancer cells. Experiments in animals have shown that targeting of CD44 by antibodies, antisense oligonucleotides, and CD44-soluble proteins markedly reduces the malignant activities of various neoplasms, stressing the therapeutic potential of anti-CD44 agents.

High levels of the adhesion molecule CD44 on leukemic cells are essential to generate leukemia. Furthermore, because alternative splicing and posttranslational modifications generate many different CD44 sequences, including, perhaps, tumor-specific sequences, the production of anti-CD44 tumor-specific agents may be a realistic therapeutic approach.

In many cancers (renal cancer and non-Hodgkin's lymphomas are exceptions), a high level of CD44 expression is not always associated with an unfavorable outcome. On the contrary, in some neoplasms CD44 upregulation is associated with a favorable outcome. This is true of prostate cancer, where the transcript variant CD44v5 (includes the fifth 'v5' exon) is associated with better prognosis (increased time to recurrence following surgery). In prostate cancer, the exclusion of the v5 exon through alternative splicing was associated with the presence of RNA binding protein KHDRBS1 and became included in the presence of increased YTHDC1 or metadherin expression.

In other cases different research groups analyzing the same neoplastic disease reached contradictory conclusions regarding the correlation between CD44 expression and disease prognosis, possibly due to differences in methodology. These problems must be resolved before applying anti-CD44 therapy to human cancers.

== Interactions ==
CD44 has been shown to interact with:

- ARHGEF1,
- Ezrin, via PIP_{2},
- Epidermal Growth Factor Receptor (Hyaluronan-dependent),
- Fibrin and immobilized fibrinogen,
- Fibronectin,
- FYN,
- Hyaluronan,
- Lck,
- Osteopontin
- Selectins, and
- Src,
- CD74.
