= Maitansine =

Names
- Other names Maytansin

Identifiers
| CAS Number | 35846-53-8 |
| 3D model (JSmol) | Interactive image |
| ChEBI | CHEBI:6701 |
| ChEMBL | ChEMBL488931 |
| ChemSpider | 10274768 |
| ECHA InfoCard | 100.047.944 |
| PubChem CID | 5281828 |
| UNII | 14083FR882 |
| CompTox Dashboard (EPA) | DTXSID00879995 |
- InChI: InChI=1S/C34H46ClN3O10/c1-18-11-10-12-26(45-9)34(43)17-25(46-32(42)36-34)19(2)30-33(5,48-30)27(47-31(41)20(3)37(6)21(4)39)16-28(40)38(7)23-14-22(13-18)15-24(44-8)29(23)35/h10-12,14-15,19-20,25-27,30,43H,13,16-17H2,1-9H3,(H,36,42)/b12-10+,18-11+/t19-,20+,25+,26-,27+,30+,33+,34+/m1/s1 Key: WKPWGQKGSOKKOO-RSFHAFMBSA-N
- SMILES: C/C(CC1=CC(OC)=C(Cl)C(N3C)=C1)=C\C=C\[C@@H](OC)[C@@]2(O)C[C@]([C@@H](C)[C@H]4[C@](O4)(C)[C@@H](OC([C@H](C)N(C)C(C)=O)=O)CC3=O)([H])OC(N2)=O

Properties
| Chemical formula | C_{34}H_{46}ClN_{3}O_{10} |
| Molar mass | 692.20 g/mol |
- Except where otherwise noted, data are given for materials in their standard state (at 25 °C [77 °F], 100 kPa). verify (what is ?) Infobox references

Maitansine (INN), or maytansine (USAN), is a cytotoxic agent. It inhibits the assembly of microtubules by binding to tubulin at the rhizoxin binding site. The maytansine binding site and binding mode has been characterized.

It is a macrolide of the ansamycin type and can be isolated from plants of the genus Maytenus.

== Maytansinoids ==
Derivatives of maitansine are known as maytansinoids. Some are being investigated as the cytotoxic component of antibody-drug conjugates for cancer treatment, and the antibody-drug conjugate trastuzumab emtansine is an approved drug for the treatment of certain kinds of breast cancer in the EU and in the US.

Examples of maytansinoids are:

- Ansamitocin
- Mertansine / emtansine (DM1)
- Ravtansine / soravtansine (DM4)

== See also ==
- ImmunoGen, developer of maytansinoid based drugs
