= Mucin short variant S1 =

Human protein

MUC1
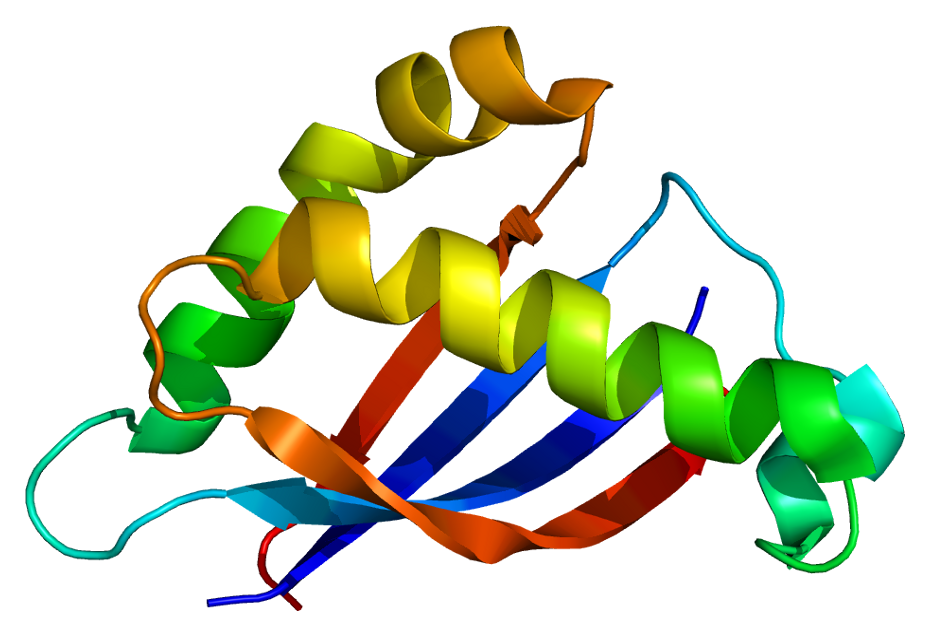

Identifiers
- Aliases: MUC1, ADMCKD, ADMCKD1, CA 15-3, CD227, EMA, H23AG, KL-6, MAM6, MCD, MCKD, MCKD1, MUC-1, MUC-1/SEC, MUC-1/X, MUC1/ZD, PEM, PEMT, PUM, mucin 1, cell surface associated, ADTKD2, Ca15-3, Mucin-1
- External IDs: OMIM: 158340; GeneCards: MUC1
Available structures
PDB	Human UniProt search: PDBe RCSB
PDB	List of PDB id codes 1SM3, 2ACM

Gene location (Human)
Chr.	Chromosome 1 (human)
Band	1q22	Start	155,185,824 bp
Band	1q22	End	155,192,916 bp
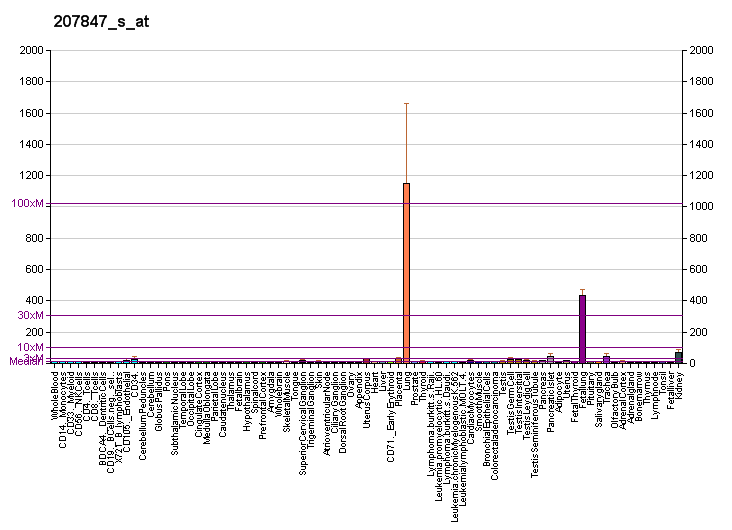

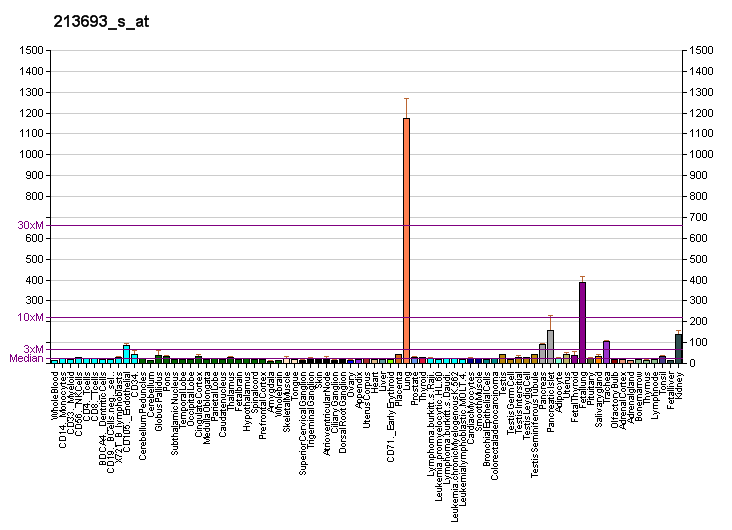

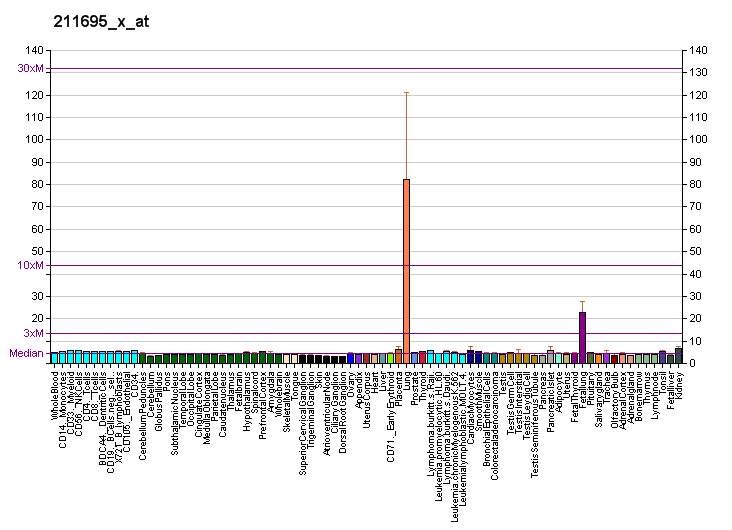
RNA expression pattern
Bgee	Human / Mouse (ortholog); Top expressed in: pylorus; pancreatic ductal cell; nasal epithelium; right uterine tube; cardia; olfactory zone of nasal mucosa; lower lobe of lung; buccal mucosa cell; gastric mucosa; palpebral conjunctiva / n/a; More reference expression data
BioGPS	More reference expression data
Gene ontology
Molecular function	protein binding; transcription coregulator activity; RNA polymerase II cis-regulatory region sequence-specific DNA binding; p53 binding
Cellular component	extracellular region; cytoplasm; integral component of membrane; nucleus; Golgi lumen; integral component of plasma membrane; apical plasma membrane; membrane; vesicle; extracellular exosome; extracellular space; plasma membrane
Biological process	positive regulation of histone H4 acetylation; regulation of transcription from RNA polymerase II promoter in response to stress; DNA damage response, signal transduction by p53 class mediator resulting in cell cycle arrest; negative regulation of intrinsic apoptotic signaling pathway in response to DNA damage by p53 class mediator; negative regulation of cell adhesion mediated by integrin; DNA damage response, signal transduction by p53 class mediator resulting in transcription of p21 class mediator; positive regulation of transcription from RNA polymerase II promoter in response to stress; O-glycan processing; negative regulation of transcription by competitive promoter binding; stimulatory C-type lectin receptor signaling pathway; cytokine-mediated signaling pathway
Sources:Amigo / QuickGO
Orthologs
Databases	NCBI: entry; OMA: entry
Species	Human	Mouse
Entrez	4582	n/a
Ensembl	ENSG00000185499	n/a
UniProt	P15941; Q7Z551	n/a
RefSeq (mRNA)	NM_001018016; NM_001018017; NM_001018021; NM_001044390; NM_001044391 NM_001044392; NM_001044393; NM_001204285; NM_001204286; NM_001204287; NM_001204288; NM_001204289; NM_001204290; NM_001204291; NM_001204292; NM_001204293; NM_001204294; NM_001204295; NM_001204296; NM_001204297; NM_002456; NM_182741; NM_001371720	n/a
RefSeq (protein)	NP_001018016; NP_001018017; NP_001037855; NP_001037856; NP_001037857 NP_001037858; NP_001191214; NP_001191215; NP_001191216; NP_001191217; NP_001191218; NP_001191219; NP_001191220; NP_001191221; NP_001191222; NP_001191223; NP_001191224; NP_001191225; NP_001191226; NP_002447; NP_001358649; NP_001191217.1; NP_001191225.1; NP_001037856.1	n/a
Location (UCSC)	Chr 1: 155.19 – 155.19 Mb	n/a
PubMed search		n/a
- Wikidata
View/Edit Human

Mucin short variant S1, also called polymorphic epithelial mucin (PEM) or epithelial membrane antigen (EMA), is a mucin encoded by the MUC1 gene in humans. Mucin short variant S1 is a glycoprotein with extensive O-linked glycosylation of its extracellular domain. Mucins line the apical surface of epithelial cells in the lungs, stomach, intestines, eyes and several other organs. Mucins protect the body from infection by pathogen binding to oligosaccharides in the extracellular domain, preventing the pathogen from reaching the cell surface. Overexpression of MUC1 is often associated with colon, breast, ovarian, lung and pancreatic cancers. Joyce Taylor-Papadimitriou identified and characterised the antigen during her work with breast and ovarian tumors.

== Structure ==
MUC1 is a member of the mucin family and encodes a membrane bound, glycosylated phosphoprotein. MUC1 has a core protein mass of 120-225 kDa which increases to 250-500 kDa with glycosylation. It extends 200-500 nm beyond the surface of the cell.

The protein is anchored to the apical surface of many epithelia by a transmembrane domain. Beyond the transmembrane domain is a SEA domain that contains a cleavage site for release of the large extracellular domain. The release of mucins is performed by sheddases. The extracellular domain includes a 20 amino acid variable number tandem repeat (VNTR) domain, with the number of repeats varying from 20 to 120 in different individuals. These repeats are rich in serine, threonine and proline residues which permits heavy o-glycosylation.

Multiple alternatively spliced transcript variants that encode different isoforms of this gene have been reported, but the full-length nature of only some has been determined.

MUC1 is cleaved in the endoplasmic reticulum into two pieces, the cytoplasmic tail including the transmembrane domain and the extracellular domain. These domains tightly associate in a non-covalent fashion. This tight, non-covalent association is not broken by treatment with urea, low pH, high salt or boiling. Treatment with sodium dodecyl sulfate triggers dissociation of the subunits. The cytoplasmic tail of MUC1 is 72 amino acids long and contains several phosphorylation sites.

== Function ==
The protein serves a protective function by binding to pathogens and also functions in a cell signaling capacity.

Overexpression, aberrant intracellular localization, and changes in glycosylation of this protein have been associated with carcinomas. e.g. The CanAg tumour antigen is a novel glycoform of MUC1. In the cell nucleus, the protein MUC1 regulates the activity of transcription factor complexes that have a documented role in tumor-induced changes of host immunity.

== Interactions ==
MUC1 has been shown to interact with:

- CTNND1,
- ERBB2,
- GRB2,
- JUP, and
- SOS1.

== Role in cancer ==
The ability of chemotherapeutic drugs to access the cancer cells is inhibited by the heavy glycosylation in the extracellular domain of MUC1. The glycosylation creates a highly hydrophilic region which prevents hydrophobic chemotherapeutic drugs from passing through. This prevents the drugs from reaching their targets which usually reside within the cell. Similarly, the glycosylation has been shown to bind to growth factors. This allows cancer cells which produce a large amount of MUC1 to concentrate growth factors near their receptors, increasing receptor activity and the growth of cancer cells. MUC1 also prevents the interaction of immune cells with receptors on the cancer cell surface through steric hindrance. This inhibits an anti-tumor immune response.

=== Preventing cell death ===
MUC1 cytoplasmic tail has been shown to bind to p53. This interaction is increased by genotoxic stress. MUC1 and p53 were found to be associated with the p53 response element of the p21 gene promoter. This results in activation of p21 which results in cell cycle arrest. Association of MUC1 with p53 in cancer results in inhibition of p53-mediated apoptosis and promotion of p53-mediated cell cycle arrest.

Overexpression of MUC1 in fibroblasts increased the phosphorylation of Akt. Phosphorylation of Akt results in phosphorylation of Bcl-2-associated death promoter. This results in dissociation of Bcl-2-associated death promoter with Bcl-2 and Bcl-xL. Activation was shown to be dependent on the upstream activation of PI3K. Additionally, MUC1 was shown to increase expression of Bcl-xL. Overexpression of MUC1 in cancer. The presence of free Bcl-2 and Bcl-xL prevents the release of cytochrome c from mitochondria, thereby preventing apoptosis. MUC1 cytoplasmic tail is shuttled to the mitochondria through interaction with hsp90. This interaction is induced through phosphorylation of the MUC1 cytoplasmic tail by Src (gene). Src is activated by the EGF receptor family ligand Neuregulin. The cytoplasmic tail is then inserted into the mitochondrial outer membrane. Localization of MUC1 to the mitochondria prevents the activation of apoptotic mechanisms.

=== Promoting tumor invasion ===
MUC1 cytoplasmic tail was shown to interact with Beta-catenin. A SXXXXXSSL motif was identified in MUC1 that is conserved with other beta-catenin binding partners. This interaction was shown to be dependent on cell adhesion. Studies have demonstrated that MUC1 is phosphorylated on a YEKV motif. Phosphorylation of this site has been demonstrated by LYN through mediation of interleukin 7, Src through mediation of EGFR, and PRKCD. This interaction is antagonized by degradation of beta-catenin by GSK3B. MUC1 blocks the phosphorylation-dependent degradation of beta-catenin by GSK3B. The result is that increased expression of MUC1 in cancer increases stabilized beta-catenin. This promotes the expression of vimentin and CDH2. These proteins are associated with a mesenchymal phenotype, characterized by increased motility and invasiveness. In cancer cells, increased expression of MUC1 promotes cancer cell invasion through beta-catenin, resulting in the initiation of epithelial-mesenchymal transition which promotes the formation of metastases.

== Diagnostic uses ==
=== Blood tests: Cancer Antigens (CA) 27.29 and 15-3 ===
CA 27.29 (a.k.a. BR 27.29) and CA 15-3 measure different epitopes of the same protein antigen product of the MUC1 gene seen in breast cancer. CA 27.29 has enhanced sensitivity and specificity compared to CA 15-3 and is elevated in 30% of patients with low-stage disease and 60 to 70% of patients with advanced-stage breast cancer.

CA 27.29 levels over 100 U/mL and CA 15-3 levels over 25 U/mL are rare in benign conditions and suggest malignancy.

=== Immunohistochemistry ===
Using immunohistochemistry, MUC1 can be identified in a wide range of secretory epithelia and their neoplastic equivalents:

- It is a marker of various types of cancer (see below).
- In micropapillary carcinoma of the breast and bladder, MUC1 stains the stroma-facing surface of cell clusters of micropapillary units.
- It can distinguish systemic anaplastic large cell lymphoma (MUC1 positive) from cutaneous anaplastic large cell lymphoma (usually MUC1 negative).
- Although other antibodies, such as cytokeratins, are more commonly used for the identification of metastatic carcinoma deposits, EMA can be used to distinguish mesothelioma, in which it is restricted to the cell membranes and associated micovilli, from adenocarcinoma, in which it is diffusely spread through the cytoplasm.

Diseases with positive MUC1 staining

- Adenocarcinomas

- Breast cancer
- Colorectal cancer
- Pancreatic cancer

- Carcinoid tumor, chordoma
- Choriocarcinoma
- Desmoplastic small-round-cell tumor
- Epithelioid sarcoma
- Follicular dendritic cell sarcoma, interdigitating dendritic cell sarcoma, reticulum cell sarcoma
- Lung: Type II cell lesions (hyperplasia, dysplasia)
- Lymphomas

- Anaplastic large-cell lymphoma
- Diffuse large B-cell lymphoma (variable expression)
- Plasmablastic lymphoma
- Primary effusion lymphoma

- Meningioma
- Mesotheliomas (epithelioid)
- Myeloma
- Paget's disease of the breast
- Perineurioma
- Plasmacytomas
- Renal cell carcinoma
- Synovial sarcoma (epithelial areas)
- Thymic carcinoma (often)

Negative staining

- Myoepithelial cells
- Adrenocortical carcinoma

Hepatocellular carcinoma
Germ cell tumors (except choriocarcinoma)

- Acquired cystic kidney disease-associated renal cell carcinoma
- Leiomyosarcoma (usually)
- Liposarcoma
- Melanoma
- Neuroblastoma
- Paraganglioma
- Solitary fibrous tumor

Normal tissues with positive staining

- Apical surface of almost all glandular and ductal epithelial cells:

- Breast, including Toker cells
- Distal convoluted tubule of kidney
- Type II cells of pulmonary alveoli
- Pancreas
- Salivary glands
- eccrine and apocrine glands of the skin

- Several white blood cells:

- Activated T cells
- Some B cells
- Monocytes

- Follicular dendritic cells
- Perineurial cells

== As a therapeutic drug target ==
Using MUC1, vaccines are being tested against a type of blood cancer called multiple myeloma. The technology could in theory be applied to 90 percent of all known cancers, including prostate and breast cancer, solid and non-solid tumors. This method would activate the immune system by training T-cells to search out and destroy cells that display a specific molecule (or marker) of MUC1. MUC1 is found on nearly all epithelial cells, but it is over expressed in cancer cells, and its associated glycans are shorter than those of non-tumor-associated MUC1.

Because MUC1 is overexpressed (and differently glycosylated) in many cancers it has been investigated as a drug target, e.g. for the MUC1 vaccine ONT-10, which has had a phase 1 clinical study.

== See also ==
- Cluster of differentiation
- List of histologic stains that aid in diagnosis of cutaneous conditions
- Mucin-1
