= Syndecan-4 =

Protein-coding gene in the species Homo sapiens

SDC4
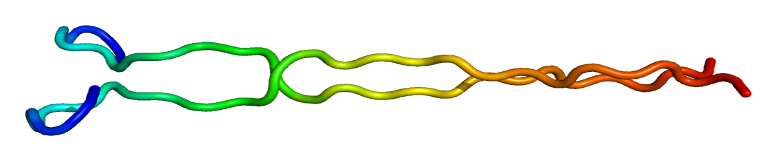

Identifiers
- Aliases: SDC4, SYND4, syndecan 4
- External IDs: OMIM: 600017; MGI: 1349164; GeneCards: SDC4
Available structures
PDB	Ortholog search: PDBe RCSB
PDB	List of PDB id codes 1EJP, 1EJQ, 1OBY, 1YBO

Gene location (Human)
Chr.	Chromosome 20 (human)
Band	20q13.12	Start	45,325,288 bp
Band	20q13.12	End	45,348,424 bp

Gene location (Mouse)
Chr.	Chromosome 2 (mouse)
Band	2 H3|2 85.16 cM	Start	164,266,167 bp
Band	2 H3|2 85.16 cM	End	164,285,807 bp
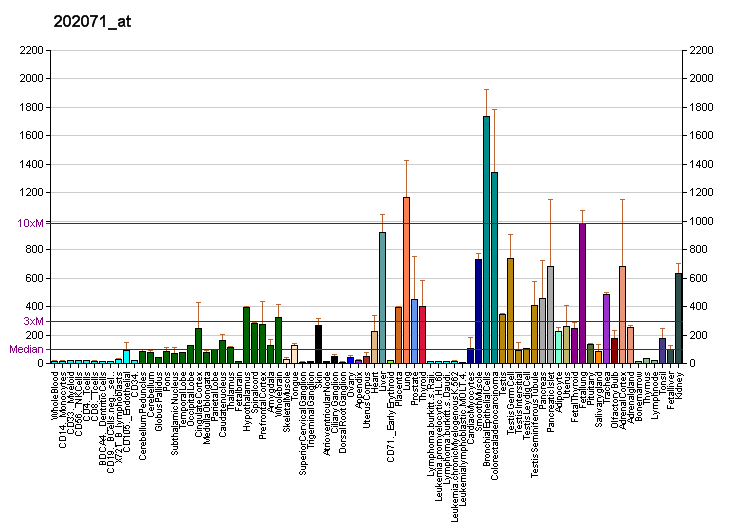
RNA expression pattern
Bgee	Human / Mouse (ortholog); Top expressed in: olfactory zone of nasal mucosa; nasal epithelium; cartilage tissue; beta cell; epithelium of bronchus; bronchial epithelial cell; skin of abdomen; skin of leg; external globus pallidus; human kidney / Top expressed in: vestibular membrane of cochlear duct; gallbladder; lacrimal gland; blastocyst; ciliary body; utricle; ascending aorta; left lobe of liver; superior surface of tongue; aortic valve; More reference expression data
BioGPS	More reference expression data
Gene ontology
Molecular function	fibronectin binding; protein binding; thrombospondin receptor activity; protein kinase C binding; identical protein binding
Cellular component	integral component of membrane; membrane; focal adhesion; plasma membrane; integral component of plasma membrane; extracellular region; lysosomal lumen; Golgi lumen; membrane raft; costamere; extracellular exosome; cell surface
Biological process	glycosaminoglycan metabolic process; ureteric bud development; inner ear receptor cell stereocilium organization; positive regulation of extracellular exosome assembly; wound healing; retinoid metabolic process; neural tube closure; glycosaminoglycan catabolic process; glycosaminoglycan biosynthetic process; positive regulation of focal adhesion assembly; positive regulation of exosomal secretion; regulation of fibroblast migration; positive regulation of stress fiber assembly; positive regulation of protein kinase activity; signal transduction; negative regulation of T cell proliferation; leukocyte migration; cell migration
Sources:Amigo / QuickGO
Orthologs
Databases	NCBI: entry; OMA: entry
Species	Human	Mouse
Entrez	6385	20971
Ensembl	ENSG00000124145	ENSMUSG00000017009
UniProt	P31431	O35988
RefSeq (mRNA)	NM_002999	NM_011521
RefSeq (protein)	NP_002990	NP_035651
Location (UCSC)	Chr 20: 45.33 – 45.35 Mb	Chr 2: 164.27 – 164.29 Mb
PubMed search
- Wikidata
View/Edit Human	View/Edit Mouse

Syndecan-4 is a protein that in humans is encoded by the SDC4 gene. Syndecan-4 is one of the four vertebrate syndecans and has a molecular weight of ~20 kDa.

== Structure ==
Syndecans are the best-characterized plasma membrane proteoglycans. Their intracellular domain of membrane-spanning core protein interacts with actin cytoskeleton and signaling molecules in the cell cortex. Syndecans are normally found on the cell surface of fibroblasts and epithelial cells. Syndecans interact with fibronectin on the cell surface, cytoskeletal and signaling proteins inside the cell to modulate the function of integrin in cell-matrix adhesion. Also, syndecans bind to FGFs and bring them to the FGF receptor on the same cell. As a co-receptor or regulator, mutated certain proteoglycans could cause severe developmental defects, like disordered distribution or inactivation of signaling molecules.

Syndecans have similar structural features:

- Attach to heparan sulfate chains – interacting factors (e.g. Matrix molecules, growth factors, and enzymes)
- Chondroitin sulfate chain
- Transmembrane domain – self-association
- C1 domain – actin-association cytoskeleton
- Variable domain – syndecan-specific
- C2 domain – attach to PDZ proteins

Syndecans normally form homodimers or multimers. Their biological function includes cell growth regulation, differentiation, and adhesion. Syndecan-4 has more widespread distribution than other syndecans and it is the only syndecan that has been found consistently in focal adhesions.

== Gene ==
Syndecan-4 is also called ryudocan or amphiglycan. It is found on chromosome 20, while a pseudogene has been found on chromosome 22. Syndecan-4 is one of the four vertebrate syndecans and has a molecular weight of ~20 kDa. It has more widespread distribution than other syndecans, and it is the only syndecan that has been found consistently in focal adhesions.

== Function ==
Syndecan-4 is a transmembrane (type I) heparan sulfate proteoglycan that functions as a receptor in intracellular signaling. The protein is found as a homodimer and is a member of the syndecan proteoglycan family. Syndecan-4 interacts with extracellular matrix, anticoagulants, and growth-factors. It also regulates the actin cytoskeleton, cell adhesion, and cell migration.

Syndecan-4 activates protein kinase C (PKC), an enzyme involved in signal transduction. The variable domain of syndecan-4 could be a site of self-association. The degree of oligomerization correlates with the activity of kinases, so the degree of clustering of syndecan-4 correlates to PKC activity. Syndecan-4 also binds to phosphatidylinositol 4,5-bisphosphate (PIP_{2}) through the variable domain and increases PKC activity ten-fold.

Syndecan-4 is also a regulator of fibroblast growth factor-2 (FGF-2) signaling. Syndecan-4 binds to FGF and mediates interaction with the FGF receptor. Because the tight correlation between syndecan-4 and growth factors, the efficiency of angiogenic therapies have been thought to relate to syndecan-4. Growth factor signaling may be disrupted by changes in syndecan-4 expression. The cellular uptake, trafficking, and nuclear localization of FGF-2 could be increased by co-delivery of syndecan-4 proteoliposomes. These alterations should be considered in FGF-2-based therapies.

Syndecan-4 is also associated with the healing process. Lack of Sdc4 gene causes delayed wound healing in mice. This delay may be due to compromised fibroblast motility.

== Clinical significance ==
=== Endometriosis ===
Syndecan-4 expression is upregulated in the endometrium of women suffering from endometriosis, and its downregulation in endometriotic cells results in a decrease of invasive growth, and reduced expression of the small GTPase Rac1, Activating transcription factor 2 (ATF2), and MMP3.

=== Osteoarthritis ===
Syndecan-4 is upregulated in osteoarthritis and inhibition of syndecan-4 reduces cartilage destruction in mouse models of OA.

See Sindecán-4 at the Spanish Wikipedia
