= Toker cell =

Epithelial cell type

A Toker cell is an epithelial cell with clear cytoplasm in the nipple of some women. Toker cells are believed to develop from sebaceous glands. They are cytokeratin 7 (CK7) positive, in contrast to squamous epithelium. Rarely, they can be numerous and atypical, and difficult to distinguish from malignant cells of Paget's disease of the breast. In such cases, immunohistochemistry using CD138 and p53 can be used for distinction, both being negative in Toker cells and positive in Paget's disease.
