= Mertansine =

Names
- Other names Maytansinoid DM1; N_{2}'-deacetyl-N_{2}'-(3-mercapto-1-oxopropyl)-maytansine

Identifiers
CAS Number	139504-50-0
3D model (JSmol)	Interactive image
ChEBI	CHEBI:82755
ChemSpider	34448592
ECHA InfoCard	100.168.831
PubChem CID	11343137
UNII	DDZ29HGH0E
- InChI: InChI=1S/C35H48ClN3O10S/c1-19-10-9-11-26(46-8)35(44)18-25(47-33(43)37-35)20(2)31-34(4,49-31)27(48-32(42)21(3)38(5)28(40)12-13-50)17-29(41)39(6)23-15-22(14-19)16-24(45-7)30(23)36/h9-11,15-16,20-21,25-27,31,44,50H,12-14,17-18H2,1-8H3,(H,37,43)/b11-9+,19-10+/t20-,21+,25+,26-,27+,31+,34+,35+/m1/s1 Key: ANZJBCHSOXCCRQ-FKUXLPTCSA-N
- SMILES: C[C@@H]1[C@@H]2C[C@]([C@@H](/C=C/C=C(/Cc3cc(c(c(c3)OC)Cl)N(C(=O)C[C@@H]([C@]4([C@H]1O4)C)OC(=O)[C@H](C)N(C)C(=O)CCS)C)\C)OC)(NC(=O)O2)O

Properties
Chemical formula	C_{35}H_{48}ClN_{3}O_{10}S
Molar mass	738.29 g·mol^{−1}
- Except where otherwise noted, data are given for materials in their standard state (at 25 °C [77 °F], 100 kPa). verify (what is ?) Infobox references

Mertansine, also called DM1 (and in some of its forms emtansine), is a thiol-containing maytansinoid that for therapeutic purposes is attached to a monoclonal antibody through reaction of the thiol group with a linker structure to create an antibody-drug conjugate (ADC).

ADCs with this design include trastuzumab emtansine, lorvotuzumab mertansine, and cantuzumab mertansine. Some are still experimental; others are in regular clinical use.

== Mechanism of action ==
Mertansine is a tubulin inhibitor, meaning that it inhibits the assembly of microtubules by binding to tubulin (at the rhizoxin binding site).

The monoclonal antibody binds specifically to a structure (usually a protein) occurring in a tumour, thus directing mertansine into this tumour. This concept is called targeted therapy.

== Uses and chemistry ==
The following (experimental) drugs are antibody-drug conjugates (ADC) combining monoclonal antibodies with mertansine as the cytotoxic component. Mertansine is linked via 4-mercaptovaleric acid.

ADCs include:

- Bivatuzumab mertansine
- Cantuzumab mertansine
- Lorvotuzumab mertansine (IMGN901) for CD56 positive cancers, for example multiple myeloma

Mertansine linked to a monoclonal antibody (mab). The part where mertansine differs from its parent compound maytansine is shown red. The linker 4-mercaptovaleric acid is shown blue.

== Emtansine ==
DM1 can also be linked via a more complicated structure – 4-(3-mercapto-2,5-dioxo-1-pyrrolidinylmethyl)-cylohexanecarboxylic acid or SMCC –, in which case the International Nonproprietary Name of the conjugate formed contains the word emtansine. The abbreviation comes from the chemical designation "succinimidyl-trans-4-(maleimidylmethyl) cyclohexane-1-carboxylate" which is used in the primary literature as well as by the World Health Organization (WHO) despite the fact that the linker contains only one imide group according to the WHO.

DM1 and its attachment via these linkers result from ImmunoGen Inc research.

An example is:

- Trastuzumab emtansine (T-DM1), an anti-HER2/neu antibody-drug conjugate
