= Syndecan-2 =

Protein-coding gene in the species Homo sapiens

SDC2

Identifiers
- Aliases: SDC2, CD362, HSPG, HSPG1, SYND2, syndecan 2
- External IDs: OMIM: 142460; MGI: 1349165; GeneCards: SDC2

Gene location (Human)
Chr.	Chromosome 8 (human)
Band	8q22.1	Start	96,493,813 bp
Band	8q22.1	End	96,611,790 bp

Gene location (Mouse)
Chr.	Chromosome 15 (mouse)
Band	15 B3.1|15 13.74 cM	Start	32,920,869 bp
Band	15 B3.1|15 13.74 cM	End	33,035,081 bp
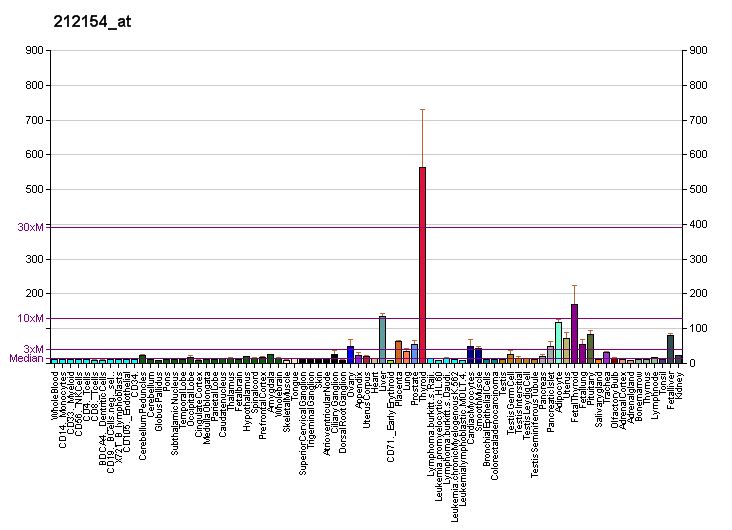

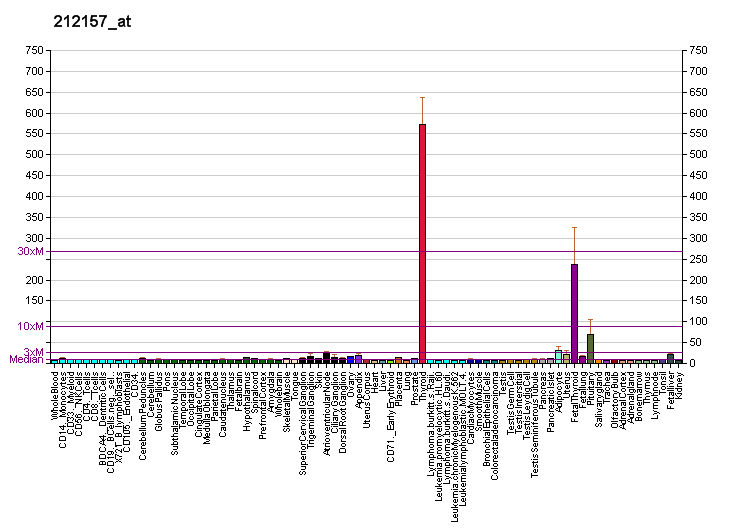

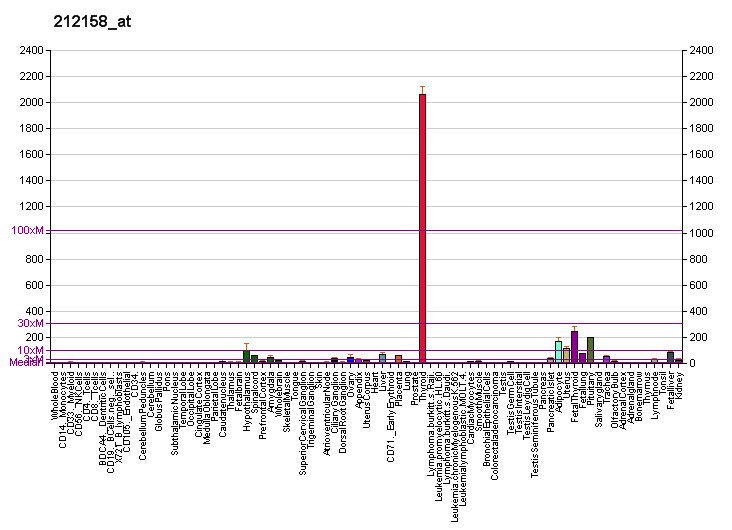
RNA expression pattern
Bgee	Human / Mouse (ortholog); Top expressed in: tibia; Achilles tendon; synovial joint; retinal pigment epithelium; left lobe of thyroid gland; right coronary artery; right lobe of thyroid gland; popliteal artery; tibial arteries; Descending thoracic aorta / Top expressed in: epithelium of lens; vestibular sensory epithelium; calvaria; body of femur; ciliary body; iris; ankle; retinal pigment epithelium; left lobe of liver; pituitary gland; More reference expression data
BioGPS	More reference expression data
Gene ontology
Molecular function	PDZ domain binding; protein binding; identical protein binding
Cellular component	integral component of membrane; membrane; plasma membrane; lysosomal lumen; Golgi lumen; endoplasmic reticulum lumen; cell surface; extracellular matrix; collagen-containing extracellular matrix
Biological process	glycosaminoglycan metabolic process; cell differentiation; ephrin receptor signaling pathway; nervous system development; retinoid metabolic process; regulation of dendrite morphogenesis; bioluminescence; glycosaminoglycan catabolic process; glycosaminoglycan biosynthetic process; leukocyte migration; post-translational protein modification; cell migration; dendrite morphogenesis; biological process
Sources:Amigo / QuickGO
Orthologs
Databases	NCBI: entry; OMA: entry
Species	Human	Mouse
Entrez	6383	15529
Ensembl	ENSG00000169439	ENSMUSG00000022261
UniProt	P34741	P43407
RefSeq (mRNA)	NM_002998	NM_008304
RefSeq (protein)	NP_002989	NP_032330
Location (UCSC)	Chr 8: 96.49 – 96.61 Mb	Chr 15: 32.92 – 33.04 Mb
PubMed search
- Wikidata
View/Edit Human	View/Edit Mouse

Syndecan-2 is a protein that in humans is encoded by the SDC2 gene.

== Function ==
The protein encoded by this gene is a transmembrane (type I) heparan sulfate proteoglycan and is a member of the syndecan proteoglycan family. The syndecans mediate cell binding, cell signaling, and cytoskeletal organization and syndecan receptors are required for the internalization of the HIV-1 tat protein. The syndecan-2 protein functions as an integral membrane protein and participates in cell proliferation, cell migration and cell-matrix interactions via its receptor for extracellular matrix proteins. Altered syndecan-2 expression has been detected in several different tumor types.

== Interactions ==
SDC2 has been shown to interact with:

- CASK,
- Laminin, alpha 3, and
- EZR
