= Heparanase =

Mammalian protein found in Homo sapiens

HPSE

Identifiers
- Aliases: HPSE, HPA, HPA1, HPR1, HPSE1, HSE1, heparanase
- External IDs: OMIM: 604724; MGI: 1343124; GeneCards: HPSE
Available structures
| PDB | Ortholog search: PDBe RCSB |
| PDB | List of PDB id codes 5E97, 5E9B, 5E8M, 5E98, 5E9C |
Enzyme activity
| EC # | BRENDA | ExPASy | KEGG | MetaCyc |
|---|---|---|---|---|
| 3.2.1.166 | ↗ | ↗ | ↗ | ↗ |

Gene location (Human)
| Chr. | Chromosome 4 (human) |
| Band | 4q21.23 | Start | 83,292,461 bp |
| Band | 4q21.23 | End | 83,335,153 bp |

Gene location (Mouse)
| Chr. | Chromosome 5 (mouse) |
| Band | 5|5 E4 | Start | 100,827,350 bp |
| Band | 5|5 E4 | End | 100,867,582 bp |
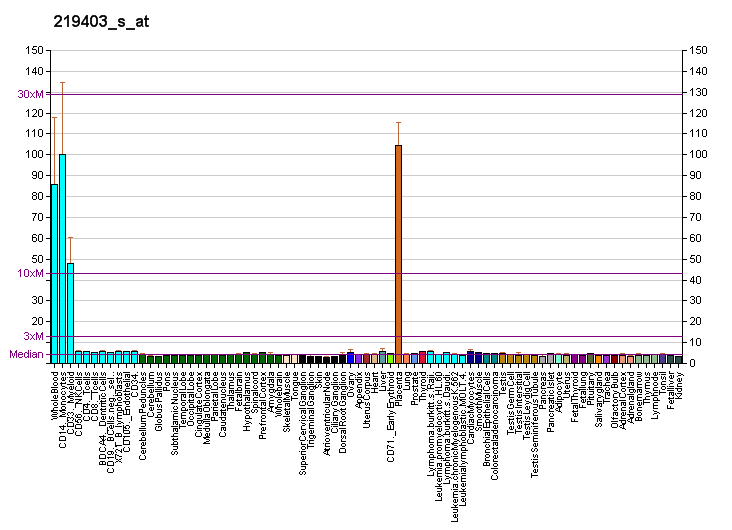
RNA expression pattern
| Bgee | Human / Mouse (ortholog); Top expressed in: monocyte; gums; gingival epithelium; blood; human penis; oral cavity; granulocyte; germinal epithelium; gonad; minor salivary glands / Top expressed in: iris; stria vascularis; mesenteric lymph nodes; blood; calvaria; lumbar spinal ganglion; stroma of bone marrow; esophagus; otolith organ; set of bones of free part of upper limb; More reference expression data |
| BioGPS | More reference expression data |
Gene ontology
| Molecular function | protein dimerization activity; heparanase activity; beta-glucuronidase activity; hydrolase activity, acting on glycosyl bonds; protein binding; syndecan binding; hydrolase activity |
| Cellular component | intracellular membrane-bounded organelle; membrane; nucleoplasm; lysosomal membrane; lysosomal lumen; membrane raft; lysosome; nucleus; extracellular region; specific granule lumen; extracellular matrix |
| Biological process | positive regulation of osteoblast proliferation; positive regulation of protein kinase B signaling; heparan sulfate proteoglycan catabolic process; regulation of hair follicle development; positive regulation of hair follicle development; wound healing; vascular wound healing; cell adhesion; positive regulation of blood coagulation; proteoglycan metabolic process; glycosaminoglycan catabolic process; positive regulation of vascular endothelial growth factor production; cell-matrix adhesion; angiogenesis involved in wound healing; neutrophil degranulation |
Sources:Amigo / QuickGO
Orthologs
| Databases | NCBI: entry; OMA: entry |
| Species | Human | Mouse |
| Entrez | 10855 | 15442 |
| Ensembl | ENSG00000173083 | ENSMUSG00000035273 |
| UniProt | Q9Y251 | Q6YGZ1 |
| RefSeq (mRNA) | NM_006665; NM_001098540; NM_001166498; NM_001199830 | NM_152803 |
| RefSeq (protein) | NP_001092010; NP_001159970; NP_001186759; NP_006656 | NP_690016 |
| Location (UCSC) | Chr 4: 83.29 – 83.34 Mb | Chr 5: 100.83 – 100.87 Mb |
| PubMed search |
- Wikidata
| View/Edit Human | View/Edit Mouse |

Heparanase, also known as HPSE, is an enzyme that acts both at the cell-surface and within the extracellular matrix to degrade polymeric heparan sulfate molecules into shorter chain length oligosaccharides.

== Synthesis and structure ==
The protein is originally synthesised in an inactive 65 kDa proheparanase form in the golgi apparatus and transferred to late endosomes/lysosomes for transport to the cell-surface. In the lysosome it is proteolytically processed into its active form. Proteolytic processing results in the production of three products,

- a linker peptide
- an 8 kDa proheparanase fragment and
- a 50 kDa proheparanase fragment

The 8 kDa and 50 kDa fragments form a heterodimer and it is this heterodimer that constitutes the active heparanase molecule. The linker protein is so called because prior to its excision it physically links the 8 kDa and 50 kDa proheparanase fragments. Complete excision of the linker peptide appears to be a prerequisite to the complete activation of the heparanase enzyme.

Crystal structures of both proheparanase and mature heparanase are available, showing that the linker peptide forms a large helical domain which blocks heparan sulfate molecules from interacting with heparanase. Removal of the linker reveals an extended cleft on the enzyme surface, which contains the heparanase active site.

== Function ==
Heparanase has endoglycosidase activity and cleaves polymeric heparan sulfate molecules at sites which are internal within the polymeric chain. The enzyme degrades the heparan sulfate scaffold of the basement membrane and extracellular matrix. It is also associated with the inflammatory process, by allowing the extravasation of activated T lymphocytes. In ocular surface physiology this activity functions as an off/on switch for the prosecretory mitogen lacritin. Lacritin binds the cell surface heparan sulfate proteoglycan syndecan-1 only in the presence of active heparanase. Heparanase partially or completely cleaves heparan sulfate to expose a binding site in the N-terminal 50 amino acids of syndecan-1.

== Clinical significance ==
The successful penetration of the endothelial cell layer that lines the interior surface of blood vessels is an important process in the formation of blood borne tumour metastases. Heparan sulfate proteoglycans are major constituents of this layer and it has been shown that increased metastatic potential corresponds with increased heparanase activity for a number of cell lines. Due to the contribution of heparanase activity to metastasis and also to angiogenesis, the inhibition of heparanase activity is considered to be a potential target for anti-cancer therapies.

Heparanase has been shown to promote arterial thrombosis and stent thrombosis in mouse models due to the cleavage of anti-coagulant heparan sulfate proteoglycans.
