= ImmunoGen =

Biotechnology company

ImmunoGen Inc.
- Type: Subsidiary
- Traded as: Nasdaq: IMGN
- Industry: Biopharmaceuticals
- Founded: 1981; 45 years ago
- Defunct: 2024
- Fate: Acquired by AbbVie
- Headquarters: Waltham, Massachusetts, United States
- Revenue: ▲$65.2 million (2019)
- Number of employees: 75
- Website: www.immunogen.com

ImmunoGen, Inc. was a biotechnology company focused on the development of antibody-drug conjugate (ADC) therapeutics for the treatment of cancer. ImmunoGen was founded in 1981 and was headquartered in Waltham, Massachusetts.

An ImmunoGen ADC contains a manufactured antibody that binds to a target found on cancer cells, with one of the company's potent cell-killing agents attached as a "payload". The antibody serves to deliver the cell-killing agent specifically to cancer cells bearing its target and the payload serves to kill these cells. In some cases, the antibody also has anticancer activity.

In November 2023, AbbVie, an American pharmaceutical company, announced it was buying ImmunoGen for $10.1 billion.

== Linkage technology ==
Currently approved ADCs with ImmunoGen technology employ one of the company's maytansinoid cell-killing agents, either DM1 or DM4, or one of the company's DNA-acting IGN payloads.

- DM1 attached to an antibody with ImmunoGen's thioether linker is called "emtansine" in its INN name
  - trastuzumab emtansine, marketed as Kadcyla
- DM1 attached to an antibody with ImmunoGen's SPP linker is called "mertansine".
- DM4 attached with ImmunoGen's SPDB linker is called "ravtansine"
  - indatuximab ravtansine (BT062) targeting multiple myeloma,
  - anetumab ravtansine (BAY94-9343) targeting mesothelin (to treat mesothelioma), starting phase II trial in 2016
  - coltuximab ravtansine (SAR3419) targeting CD19 to treat acute lymphoblastic leukemia (ALL).
- DM4 attached with ImmunoGen's sSPDB linker is called "soravtansine"
  - mirvetuximab soravtansine

ImmunoGen also developed isatuximab, a monoclonal antibody without linkage to a toxin.

== Pipeline ==
ImmunoGen uses its ADC technology to develop its own product candidates. The mirvetuximab, which has been submitted for FDA approval, is being developed as a monotherapy or a standalone treatment for ovarian cancer. Other products currently in clinical-stage development include:

- IMGN853, (mirvetuximab soravtansine) targeting FRα, and using DM4.
- IMGN529, targeting CD37 for Non-Hodgkin lymphoma (NHL).
- IMGN289, targeting EGFR
- IMGN779, a CD33-Targeted Antibody-Drug Conjugate (ADC) with a new DNA-Alkylating agent acts on AML Cells.
- IMGN632, anti-CD123
- SAR408701 in collaboration with Sanofi
- SAR428926 in collaboration with Sanofi
- SAR566658 in collaboration with Sanofi
- SAR650984 in collaboration with Sanofi
- LY3076226 in collaboration with Eli Lilly
- PCA062 in collaboration with Novartis
- an undisclosed antibody in collaboration with Amgen

== Collaborations & licensing ==
The company also selectively out licenses limited use of its technology to other companies. Companies licensing ImmunoGen's technology include Amgen, Bayer HealthCare, Biotest, Genentech/Roche, Eli Lilly, Novartis, Sanofi, and Takeda. Roche's Kadcyla (ado-trastuzumab emtansine) utilizes ImmunoGen's ADC technology. It has been approved and launched in a number of countries, including the US, where it is marketed by Genentech, a member of the Roche Group. In October 2015, the company disclosed that Kadcyla had failed to meet its primary endpoint in the Phase II/III GATSBY trial investigating the second line treatment of HER2-positive advanced gastric cancer.
