= List of MeSH codes (D09) =

The following is a partial list of the "D" codes for Medical Subject Headings (MeSH), as defined by the United States National Library of Medicine (NLM).

This list continues the information at List of MeSH codes (D08). Codes following these are found at List of MeSH codes (D10). For other MeSH codes, see List of MeSH codes.

The source for this content is the MeSH Browser from the NLM.

== MeSH D09 – carbohydrates ==
=== MeSH D09.067 – amino sugars ===
==== MeSH D09.067.342 – hexosamines ====
- MeSH D09.067.342.300 – fructosamine
- MeSH D09.067.342.356 – galactosamine
- MeSH D09.067.342.356.050 – acetylgalactosamine
- MeSH D09.067.342.531 – glucosamine
- MeSH D09.067.342.531.050 – acetylglucosamine
- MeSH D09.067.342.600 – meglumine
- MeSH D09.067.342.600.500 – diatrizoate meglumine
- MeSH D09.067.342.600.600 – iothalamate meglumine
- MeSH D09.067.342.600.800 – meglumine antimoniate

==== MeSH D09.067.550 – muramic acids ====
- MeSH D09.067.550.050 – acetylmuramyl-alanyl-isoglutamine

==== MeSH D09.067.687 – neuraminic acids ====
- MeSH D09.067.687.668 – sialic acids
- MeSH D09.067.687.668.030 – n-acetylneuraminic acid
- MeSH D09.067.687.668.250 – cytidine monophosphate n-acetylneuraminic acid
- MeSH D09.067.687.668.775 – zanamivir

=== MeSH D09.254 – deoxy sugars ===
==== MeSH D09.254.229 – deoxyglucose ====
- MeSH D09.254.229.500 – fluorodeoxyglucose f18

=== MeSH D09.301 – dietary carbohydrates ===
==== MeSH D09.301.416 – dietary fiber ====
- MeSH D09.301.416.500 – prebiotics
- MeSH D09.301.416.750 – resistant starch

==== MeSH D09.301.831 – dietary sugars ====
- MeSH D09.301.831.250 – dietary sucrose
- MeSH D09.301.831.500 – high fructose corn syrup

==== MeSH D09.301.915 – starch ====
- MeSH D09.301.915.194 – amylopectin
- MeSH D09.301.915.361 – amylose
- MeSH D09.301.915.400 – dextrins
- MeSH D09.301.915.400.375 – cyclodextrins
- MeSH D09.301.915.400.375.222 – alpha-cyclodextrins
- MeSH D09.301.915.400.375.333 – beta-cyclodextrins
- MeSH D09.301.915.400.375.333.500 – 2-hydroxypropyl-beta-cyclodextrin
- MeSH D09.301.915.400.375.444 – gamma-cyclodextrins
- MeSH D09.301.915.500 – hydroxyethyl starch derivatives
- MeSH D09.301.915.750 – inulin
- MeSH D09.301.915.875 – resistant starch

=== MeSH D09.400 – glycoconjugates ===
==== MeSH D09.400.205 – glycation end products, advanced ====
- MeSH D09.400.205.250 – dietary advanced glycation end products
- MeSH D09.400.205.625 – glycated proteins
- MeSH D09.400.205.625.500 – glycated serum proteins
- MeSH D09.400.205.625.500.250 – glycated hemoglobin
- MeSH D09.400.205.625.500.500 – glycated serum albumin

==== MeSH D09.400.410 – glycolipids ====
- MeSH D09.400.410.209 – galactolipids
- MeSH D09.400.410.420 – glycosphingolipids
- MeSH D09.400.410.420.025 – acidic glycosphingolipids
- MeSH D09.400.410.420.025.475 – gangliosides
- MeSH D09.400.410.420.025.475.390 – g(m1) ganglioside
- MeSH D09.400.410.420.025.475.400 – g(m2) ganglioside
- MeSH D09.400.410.420.025.475.510 – g(m3) ganglioside
- MeSH D09.400.410.420.025.837 – sulfoglycosphingolipids
- MeSH D09.400.410.420.525 – neutral glycosphingolipids
- MeSH D09.400.410.420.525.200 – ceramides
- MeSH D09.400.410.420.525.200.250 – cerebrosides
- MeSH D09.400.410.420.525.200.250.450 – galactosylceramides
- MeSH D09.400.410.420.525.200.250.490 – glucosylceramides
- MeSH D09.400.410.420.525.200.425 – globosides
- MeSH D09.400.410.420.525.200.612 – lactosylceramides
- MeSH D09.400.410.420.525.200.906 – trihexosylceramides
- MeSH D09.400.410.420.525.870 – sphingomyelins
- MeSH D09.400.410.420.806 – psychosine
- MeSH D09.400.410.475 – glycosylphosphatidylinositols

==== MeSH D09.400.420 – glycopeptides ====
- MeSH D09.400.420.110 – bleomycin
- MeSH D09.400.420.110.690 – peplomycin
- MeSH D09.400.420.110.710 – phleomycins
- MeSH D09.400.420.405 – lipoglycopeptides
- MeSH D09.400.420.405.500 – teicoplanin
- MeSH D09.400.420.700 – peptidoglycan
- MeSH D09.400.420.800 – ristocetin
- MeSH D09.400.420.925 – vancomycin

==== MeSH D09.400.430 – glycoproteins ====
- MeSH D09.400.430.250 – activins
- MeSH D09.400.430.250.500 – inhibin-beta subunits
- MeSH D09.400.430.500 – adam proteins
- MeSH D09.400.430.500.125 – adam12 protein
- MeSH D09.400.430.500.250 – adam10 protein
- MeSH D09.400.430.500.375 – adam17 protein
- MeSH D09.400.430.500.500 – adamts proteins
- MeSH D09.400.430.500.500.500 – adamts1 protein
- MeSH D09.400.430.500.500.813 – adamts13 protein
- MeSH D09.400.430.500.500.844 – adamts4 protein
- MeSH D09.400.430.500.500.875 – adamts5 protein
- MeSH D09.400.430.500.500.937 – adamts7 protein
- MeSH D09.400.430.500.500.968 – adamts9 protein
- MeSH D09.400.430.500.750 – fertilins
- MeSH D09.400.430.532 – histidine-rich glycoprotein
- MeSH D09.400.430.563 – alpha 1-antichymotrypsin
- MeSH D09.400.430.594 – alpha 1-antitrypsin
- MeSH D09.400.430.610 – alpha-2-antiplasmin
- MeSH D09.400.430.618 – alpha-2-hs-glycoprotein
- MeSH D09.400.430.625 – anti-mullerian hormone
- MeSH D09.400.430.657 – asialoglycoproteins
- MeSH D09.400.430.673 – avidin
- MeSH D09.400.430.681 – b-cell activating factor
- MeSH D09.400.430.685 – 4-1bb ligand
- MeSH D09.400.430.687 – beta 2-glycoprotein i
- MeSH D09.400.430.688 – cd27 ligand
- MeSH D09.400.430.700 – cholesterol ester transfer proteins
- MeSH D09.400.430.750 – clusterin
- MeSH D09.400.430.775 – colony-stimulating factors
- MeSH D09.400.430.775.150 – erythropoietin
- MeSH D09.400.430.775.150.500 – darbepoetin alfa
- MeSH D09.400.430.775.150.750 – epoetin alfa
- MeSH D09.400.430.775.200 – granulocyte colony-stimulating factor
- MeSH D09.400.430.775.200.500 – filgrastim
- MeSH D09.400.430.775.200.750 – lenograstim
- MeSH D09.400.430.775.300 – granulocyte-macrophage colony-stimulating factor
- MeSH D09.400.430.775.400 – interleukin-3
- MeSH D09.400.430.775.500 – macrophage colony-stimulating factor
- MeSH D09.400.430.775.750 – thrombopoietin
- MeSH D09.400.430.780 – complement c1 inhibitor protein
- MeSH D09.400.430.800 – fibrillins
- MeSH D09.400.430.800.500 – fibrillin-1
- MeSH D09.400.430.800.750 – fibrillin-2
- MeSH D09.400.430.825 – glycated proteins
- MeSH D09.400.430.825.500 – glycated serum proteins
- MeSH D09.400.430.825.500.250 – glycated hemoglobin
- MeSH D09.400.430.825.500.500 – glycated serum albumin
- MeSH D09.400.430.850 – glycodelin
- MeSH D09.400.430.860 – hemopexin
- MeSH D09.400.430.870 – hsp47 heat-shock proteins
- MeSH D09.400.430.883 – inhibins
- MeSH D09.400.430.883.500 – inhibin-beta subunits
- MeSH D09.400.430.887 – lactoferrin
- MeSH D09.400.430.890 – membrane glycoproteins
- MeSH D09.400.430.890.007 – ac133 antigen
- MeSH D09.400.430.890.014 – cd47 antigen
- MeSH D09.400.430.890.015 – cd83 antigen
- MeSH D09.400.430.890.016 – kangai-1 protein
- MeSH D09.400.430.890.017 – podoplanin
- MeSH D09.400.430.890.018 – tetraspanin 29
- MeSH D09.400.430.890.020 – atp-binding cassette transporters
- MeSH D09.400.430.890.020.381 – atp binding cassette transporter, subfamily a
- MeSH D09.400.430.890.020.381.500 – atp binding cassette transporter 1
- MeSH D09.400.430.890.020.381.750 – atp binding cassette transporter, subfamily a, member 4
- MeSH D09.400.430.890.020.400 – atp binding cassette transporter, subfamily b
- MeSH D09.400.430.890.020.400.153 – atp binding cassette transporter, subfamily b, member 1
- MeSH D09.400.430.890.020.400.305 – atp binding cassette transporter, subfamily b, member 2
- MeSH D09.400.430.890.020.400.458 – atp binding cassette transporter, subfamily b, member 3
- MeSH D09.400.430.890.020.400.534 – atp binding cassette transporter, subfamily b, member 11
- MeSH D09.400.430.890.020.400.767 – atp-binding cassette sub-family b member 4
- MeSH D09.400.430.890.020.419 – atp binding cassette transporter, subfamily d
- MeSH D09.400.430.890.020.419.500 – atp binding cassette transporter, subfamily d, member 1
- MeSH D09.400.430.890.020.457 – atp binding cassette transporter, subfamily g
- MeSH D09.400.430.890.020.457.250 – atp binding cassette transporter, subfamily g, member 1
- MeSH D09.400.430.890.020.457.500 – atp binding cassette transporter, subfamily g, member 2
- MeSH D09.400.430.890.020.457.750 – atp binding cassette transporter, subfamily g, member 5
- MeSH D09.400.430.890.020.457.875 – atp binding cassette transporter, subfamily g, member 8
- MeSH D09.400.430.890.034 – cd58 antigens
- MeSH D09.400.430.890.034.500 – alefacept
- MeSH D09.400.430.890.045 – basigin
- MeSH D09.400.430.890.050 – thy-1 antigens
- MeSH D09.400.430.890.114 – butyrophilins
- MeSH D09.400.430.890.114.500 – myelin-oligodendrocyte glycoprotein
- MeSH D09.400.430.890.177 – cd30 ligand
- MeSH D09.400.430.890.185 – cd40 ligand
- MeSH D09.400.430.890.200 – cell adhesion molecules
- MeSH D09.400.430.890.200.049 – 12e7 antigen
- MeSH D09.400.430.890.200.074 – cd11 antigens
- MeSH D09.400.430.890.200.074.500 – cd11a antigen
- MeSH D09.400.430.890.200.074.750 – cd11b antigen
- MeSH D09.400.430.890.200.074.875 – cd11c antigen
- MeSH D09.400.430.890.200.074.937 – lymphocyte function-associated antigen-1
- MeSH D09.400.430.890.200.098 – cd24 antigen
- MeSH D09.400.430.890.200.107 – ceacam1 protein
- MeSH D09.400.430.890.200.115 – cell adhesion molecule-1
- MeSH D09.400.430.890.200.123 – nectins
- MeSH D09.400.430.890.200.131 – platelet endothelial cell adhesion molecule-1
- MeSH D09.400.430.890.200.170 – cd146 antigen
- MeSH D09.400.430.890.200.175 – endolyn
- MeSH D09.400.430.890.200.188 – cadherin related proteins
- MeSH D09.400.430.890.200.188.500 – proto-oncogene proteins c-ret
- MeSH D09.400.430.890.200.200 – cadherins
- MeSH D09.400.430.890.200.200.001 – cadherin 5
- MeSH D09.400.430.890.200.200.500 – desmosomal cadherins
- MeSH D09.400.430.890.200.200.500.249 – desmocollins
- MeSH D09.400.430.890.200.200.500.500 – desmogleins
- MeSH D09.400.430.890.200.200.500.500.500 – desmoglein 1
- MeSH D09.400.430.890.200.200.500.500.625 – desmoglein 2
- MeSH D09.400.430.890.200.200.500.500.750 – desmoglein 3
- MeSH D09.400.430.890.200.200.750 – protocadherins
- MeSH D09.400.430.890.200.210 – carcinoembryonic antigen
- MeSH D09.400.430.890.200.213 – dc-specific icam-3 grabbing nonintegrin
- MeSH D09.400.430.890.200.230 – cd4 immunoadhesins
- MeSH D09.400.430.890.200.250 – cell adhesion molecules, neuronal
- MeSH D09.400.430.890.200.250.150 – cell adhesion molecules, neuron-glia
- MeSH D09.400.430.890.200.250.150.050 – activated-leukocyte cell adhesion molecule
- MeSH D09.400.430.890.200.250.325 – contactins
- MeSH D09.400.430.890.200.250.325.100 – contactin 1
- MeSH D09.400.430.890.200.250.325.200 – contactin 2
- MeSH D09.400.430.890.200.250.500 – myelin p0 protein
- MeSH D09.400.430.890.200.250.520 – neural cell adhesion molecules
- MeSH D09.400.430.890.200.250.520.156 – cd56 antigen
- MeSH D09.400.430.890.200.250.520.578 – neural cell adhesion molecule l1
- MeSH D09.400.430.890.200.250.520.789 – neurocan
- MeSH D09.400.430.890.200.250.520.894 – neuroligins
- MeSH D09.400.430.890.200.250.640 – neurexins
- MeSH D09.400.430.890.200.250.760 – reelin protein
- MeSH D09.400.430.890.200.263 – epithelial cell adhesion molecule
- MeSH D09.400.430.890.200.275 – integrin alphaxbeta2
- MeSH D09.400.430.890.200.275.500 – cd11c antigen
- MeSH D09.400.430.890.200.275.750 – cd18 antigens
- MeSH D09.400.430.890.200.450 – intercellular adhesion molecule-1
- MeSH D09.400.430.890.200.494 – intercellular adhesion molecule-3
- MeSH D09.400.430.890.200.537 – junctional adhesion molecules
- MeSH D09.400.430.890.200.537.500 – coxsackie and adenovirus receptor-like membrane protein
- MeSH D09.400.430.890.200.537.750 – junctional adhesion molecule a
- MeSH D09.400.430.890.200.537.875 – junctional adhesion molecule b
- MeSH D09.400.430.890.200.537.937 – junctional adhesion molecule c
- MeSH D09.400.430.890.200.625 – receptors, lymphocyte homing
- MeSH D09.400.430.890.200.625.144 – hyaluronan receptors
- MeSH D09.400.430.890.200.625.347 – integrin alpha4beta1
- MeSH D09.400.430.890.200.625.550 – lymphocyte function-associated antigen-1
- MeSH D09.400.430.890.200.625.903 – l-selectin
- MeSH D09.400.430.890.200.700 – selectins
- MeSH D09.400.430.890.200.700.300 – e-selectin
- MeSH D09.400.430.890.200.700.510 – l-selectin
- MeSH D09.400.430.890.200.700.775 – p-selectin
- MeSH D09.400.430.890.200.810 – sialic acid binding ig-like lectin 2
- MeSH D09.400.430.890.200.920 – vascular cell adhesion molecule-1
- MeSH D09.400.430.890.200.960 – vasodilator-stimulated phosphoprotein
- MeSH D09.400.430.890.275 – ectodysplasins
- MeSH D09.400.430.890.294 – endothelial protein c receptor
- MeSH D09.400.430.890.312 – fas ligand protein
- MeSH D09.400.430.890.331 – fertilins
- MeSH D09.400.430.890.350 – fibronectins
- MeSH D09.400.430.890.400 – gap-43 protein
- MeSH D09.400.430.890.448 – gpi-linked proteins
- MeSH D09.400.430.890.448.100 – lipopolysaccharide receptors
- MeSH D09.400.430.890.448.120 – cd24 antigen
- MeSH D09.400.430.890.448.130 – cd55 antigens
- MeSH D09.400.430.890.448.140 – cd59 antigens
- MeSH D09.400.430.890.448.150 – bone marrow stromal antigen 2
- MeSH D09.400.430.890.448.160 – carbonic anhydrase iv
- MeSH D09.400.430.890.448.180 – cd48 antigen
- MeSH D09.400.430.890.448.190 – cd52 antigen
- MeSH D09.400.430.890.448.200 – ciliary neurotrophic factor receptor alpha subunit
- MeSH D09.400.430.890.448.250 – contactins
- MeSH D09.400.430.890.448.250.100 – contactin 1
- MeSH D09.400.430.890.448.250.200 – contactin 2
- MeSH D09.400.430.890.448.300 – ephrin-a1
- MeSH D09.400.430.890.448.310 – ephrin-a2
- MeSH D09.400.430.890.448.320 – ephrin-a3
- MeSH D09.400.430.890.448.330 – ephrin-a4
- MeSH D09.400.430.890.448.340 – ephrin-a5
- MeSH D09.400.430.890.448.370 – folate receptors, gpi-anchored
- MeSH D09.400.430.890.448.370.500 – folate receptor 1
- MeSH D09.400.430.890.448.370.750 – folate receptor 2
- MeSH D09.400.430.890.448.400 – glial cell line-derived neurotrophic factor receptors
- MeSH D09.400.430.890.448.500 – glypicans
- MeSH D09.400.430.890.448.550 – mesothelin
- MeSH D09.400.430.890.448.600 – prion proteins
- MeSH D09.400.430.890.448.700 – matrix metalloproteinase 17
- MeSH D09.400.430.890.448.738 – nogo receptors
- MeSH D09.400.430.890.448.738.250 – nogo receptor 2
- MeSH D09.400.430.890.448.738.500 – nogo receptor 1
- MeSH D09.400.430.890.448.775 – oligodendrocyte-myelin glycoprotein
- MeSH D09.400.430.890.448.813 – receptors, urokinase plasminogen activator
- MeSH D09.400.430.890.448.850 – uromodulin
- MeSH D09.400.430.890.469 – hepatitis a virus cellular receptor 1
- MeSH D09.400.430.890.479 – hepatitis a virus cellular receptor 2
- MeSH D09.400.430.890.489 – histocompatibility antigens class i
- MeSH D09.400.430.890.489.100 – beta 2-microglobulin
- MeSH D09.400.430.890.489.200 – hemochromatosis protein
- MeSH D09.400.430.890.489.400 – hla-a antigens
- MeSH D09.400.430.890.489.400.010 – hla-a1 antigen
- MeSH D09.400.430.890.489.400.020 – hla-a2 antigen
- MeSH D09.400.430.890.489.400.030 – hla-a3 antigen
- MeSH D09.400.430.890.489.400.110 – hla-a11 antigen
- MeSH D09.400.430.890.489.400.240 – hla-a24 antigen
- MeSH D09.400.430.890.489.500 – hla-b antigens
- MeSH D09.400.430.890.489.500.070 – hla-b7 antigen
- MeSH D09.400.430.890.489.500.080 – hla-b8 antigen
- MeSH D09.400.430.890.489.500.130 – hla-b13 antigen
- MeSH D09.400.430.890.489.500.140 – hla-b14 antigen
- MeSH D09.400.430.890.489.500.150 – hla-b15 antigen
- MeSH D09.400.430.890.489.500.180 – hla-b18 antigen
- MeSH D09.400.430.890.489.500.270 – hla-b27 antigen
- MeSH D09.400.430.890.489.500.350 – hla-b35 antigen
- MeSH D09.400.430.890.489.500.370 – hla-b37 antigen
- MeSH D09.400.430.890.489.500.380 – hla-b38 antigen
- MeSH D09.400.430.890.489.500.390 – hla-b39 antigen
- MeSH D09.400.430.890.489.500.400 – hla-b40 antigen
- MeSH D09.400.430.890.489.500.440 – hla-b44 antigen
- MeSH D09.400.430.890.489.500.510 – hla-b51 antigen
- MeSH D09.400.430.890.489.500.520 – hla-b52 antigen
- MeSH D09.400.430.890.489.600 – hla-c antigens
- MeSH D09.400.430.890.489.700 – hla-g antigens
- MeSH D09.400.430.890.489.850 – hla-e antigens
- MeSH D09.400.430.890.509 – histocompatibility antigens class ii
- MeSH D09.400.430.890.509.400 – hla-d antigens
- MeSH D09.400.430.890.509.400.420 – hla-dp antigens
- MeSH D09.400.430.890.509.400.420.500 – hla-dp alpha-chains
- MeSH D09.400.430.890.509.400.420.750 – hla-dp beta-chains
- MeSH D09.400.430.890.509.400.430 – hla-dq antigens
- MeSH D09.400.430.890.509.400.430.500 – hla-dq alpha-chains
- MeSH D09.400.430.890.509.400.430.750 – hla-dq beta-chains
- MeSH D09.400.430.890.509.400.440 – hla-dr antigens
- MeSH D09.400.430.890.509.400.440.100 – hla-dr alpha-chains
- MeSH D09.400.430.890.509.400.440.200 – hla-dr beta-chains
- MeSH D09.400.430.890.509.400.440.200.010 – hla-drb1 chains
- MeSH D09.400.430.890.509.400.440.200.030 – hla-drb3 chains
- MeSH D09.400.430.890.509.400.440.200.040 – hla-drb4 chains
- MeSH D09.400.430.890.509.400.440.200.050 – hla-drb5 chains
- MeSH D09.400.430.890.509.400.440.400 – hla-dr serological subtypes
- MeSH D09.400.430.890.509.400.440.400.010 – hla-dr1 antigen
- MeSH D09.400.430.890.509.400.440.400.020 – hla-dr2 antigen
- MeSH D09.400.430.890.509.400.440.400.030 – hla-dr3 antigen
- MeSH D09.400.430.890.509.400.440.400.040 – hla-dr4 antigen
- MeSH D09.400.430.890.509.400.440.400.050 – hla-dr5 antigen
- MeSH D09.400.430.890.509.400.440.400.060 – hla-dr6 antigen
- MeSH D09.400.430.890.509.400.440.400.070 – hla-dr7 antigen
- MeSH D09.400.430.890.530 – laminin
- MeSH D09.400.430.890.530.500 – kalinin
- MeSH D09.400.430.890.540 – lipopolysaccharide-binding protein
- MeSH D09.400.430.890.550 – lysosomal membrane proteins
- MeSH D09.400.430.890.550.125 – cd68 molecule
- MeSH D09.400.430.890.550.249 – tetraspanin 30
- MeSH D09.400.430.890.550.500 – lysosomal-associated membrane protein 1
- MeSH D09.400.430.890.550.750 – lysosomal-associated membrane protein 2
- MeSH D09.400.430.890.550.875 – lysosomal-associated membrane protein 3
- MeSH D09.400.430.890.560 – mucin-1
- MeSH D09.400.430.890.565 – mucin-3
- MeSH D09.400.430.890.570 – myelin-associated glycoprotein
- MeSH D09.400.430.890.597 – ox40 ligand
- MeSH D09.400.430.890.611 – phex phosphate regulating neutral endopeptidase
- MeSH D09.400.430.890.625 – platelet membrane glycoproteins
- MeSH D09.400.430.890.625.136 – cd36 antigens
- MeSH D09.400.430.890.625.298 – integrin alpha2beta1
- MeSH D09.400.430.890.625.379 – integrin alpha5beta1
- MeSH D09.400.430.890.625.419 – integrin alpha6beta1
- MeSH D09.400.430.890.625.439 – integrin alphavbeta3
- MeSH D09.400.430.890.625.449 – lysosomal-associated membrane protein 1
- MeSH D09.400.430.890.625.460 – platelet glycoprotein gpib-ix complex
- MeSH D09.400.430.890.625.785 – platelet glycoprotein gpiib-iiia complex
- MeSH D09.400.430.890.625.800 – receptors, thrombin
- MeSH D09.400.430.890.625.800.790 – receptor, par-1
- MeSH D09.400.430.890.625.800.800 – thrombomodulin
- MeSH D09.400.430.890.625.905 – p-selectin
- MeSH D09.400.430.890.736 – signaling lymphocytic activation molecule family
- MeSH D09.400.430.890.736.250 – cd48 antigen
- MeSH D09.400.430.890.736.500 – signaling lymphocytic activation molecule family member 1
- MeSH D09.400.430.890.847 – syndecans
- MeSH D09.400.430.890.847.100 – syndecan-1
- MeSH D09.400.430.890.847.200 – syndecan-2
- MeSH D09.400.430.890.847.600 – syndecan-3
- MeSH D09.400.430.890.847.800 – syndecan-4
- MeSH D09.400.430.890.895 – thrombospondins
- MeSH D09.400.430.890.895.400 – r-spondins
- MeSH D09.400.430.890.895.800 – thrombospondin 1
- MeSH D09.400.430.890.895.801 – thrombospondin 2
- MeSH D09.400.430.890.919 – triggering receptor expressed on myeloid cells-1
- MeSH D09.400.430.890.942 – uroplakins
- MeSH D09.400.430.890.942.100 – uroplakin ia
- MeSH D09.400.430.890.942.150 – uroplakin ib
- MeSH D09.400.430.890.942.200 – uroplakin ii
- MeSH D09.400.430.890.942.300 – uroplakin iii
- MeSH D09.400.430.890.990 – variant surface glycoproteins, trypanosoma
- MeSH D09.400.430.890.993 – viral envelope proteins
- MeSH D09.400.430.890.995 – zona pellucida glycoproteins
- MeSH D09.400.430.900 – mucoproteins
- MeSH D09.400.430.900.186 – cell wall skeleton
- MeSH D09.400.430.900.373 – haptoglobins
- MeSH D09.400.430.900.494 – intrinsic factor
- MeSH D09.400.430.900.631 – mucins
- MeSH D09.400.430.900.631.050 – ca-125 antigen
- MeSH D09.400.430.900.631.100 – gastric mucins
- MeSH D09.400.430.900.631.100.500 – mucin 5ac
- MeSH D09.400.430.900.631.100.750 – mucin-6
- MeSH D09.400.430.900.631.115 – mucin-1
- MeSH D09.400.430.900.631.161 – mucin-2
- MeSH D09.400.430.900.631.184 – mucin-3
- MeSH D09.400.430.900.631.195 – mucin-4
- MeSH D09.400.430.900.631.207 – mucin-5b
- MeSH D09.400.430.900.631.650 – sialomucins
- MeSH D09.400.430.900.631.650.143 – leukosialin
- MeSH D09.400.430.900.631.650.264 – endolyn
- MeSH D09.400.430.900.742 – orosomucoid
- MeSH D09.400.430.900.760 – ovomucin
- MeSH D09.400.430.900.800 – peptidoglycan
- MeSH D09.400.430.900.825 – phytohemagglutinins
- MeSH D09.400.430.900.912 – uromodulin
- MeSH D09.400.430.910 – myelin p0 protein
- MeSH D09.400.430.912 – osteonectin
- MeSH D09.400.430.915 – protein c
- MeSH D09.400.430.920 – protein s
- MeSH D09.400.430.930 – proteoglycans
- MeSH D09.400.430.930.350 – heparan sulfate proteoglycans
- MeSH D09.400.430.930.350.249 – glypicans
- MeSH D09.400.430.930.350.500 – syndecans
- MeSH D09.400.430.930.350.500.100 – syndecan-1
- MeSH D09.400.430.930.350.500.200 – syndecan-2
- MeSH D09.400.430.930.350.500.600 – syndecan-3
- MeSH D09.400.430.930.350.500.800 – syndecan-4
- MeSH D09.400.430.930.613 – proteoglycan 4
- MeSH D09.400.430.930.744 – proteoglycan link protein
- MeSH D09.400.430.930.750 – chondroitin sulfate proteoglycans
- MeSH D09.400.430.930.750.281 – hyaluronan receptors
- MeSH D09.400.430.930.750.562 – biglycan
- MeSH D09.400.430.930.750.594 – chondroitin sulfate proteoglycan 4
- MeSH D09.400.430.930.750.625 – decorin
- MeSH D09.400.430.930.750.687 – hyalectins
- MeSH D09.400.430.930.750.687.100 – aggrecans
- MeSH D09.400.430.930.750.687.275 – brevican
- MeSH D09.400.430.930.750.687.450 – neurocan
- MeSH D09.400.430.930.750.687.800 – versicans
- MeSH D09.400.430.930.875 – small leucine-rich proteoglycans
- MeSH D09.400.430.930.875.250 – biglycan
- MeSH D09.400.430.930.875.500 – decorin
- MeSH D09.400.430.930.875.625 – fibromodulin
- MeSH D09.400.430.930.875.750 – lumican
- MeSH D09.400.430.940 – serum amyloid p-component
- MeSH D09.400.430.950 – sialoglycoproteins
- MeSH D09.400.430.950.001 – dentin sialophosphoprotein
- MeSH D09.400.430.950.174 – leukosialin
- MeSH D09.400.430.950.350 – glycophorins
- MeSH D09.400.430.950.675 – integrin-binding sialoprotein
- MeSH D09.400.430.950.837 – osteopontin
- MeSH D09.400.430.952 – thyroglobulin
- MeSH D09.400.430.955 – thyroxine-binding proteins
- MeSH D09.400.430.955.500 – thyroxine-binding globulin
- MeSH D09.400.430.960 – transcortin
- MeSH D09.400.430.965 – tumor necrosis factor-alpha
- MeSH D09.400.430.982 – vitronectin
- MeSH D09.400.430.998 – zn-alpha-2-glycoprotein

=== MeSH D09.408 – glycosides ===
==== MeSH D09.408.051 – aminoglycosides ====
- MeSH D09.408.051.059 – anthracyclines
- MeSH D09.408.051.059.050 – aclarubicin
- MeSH D09.408.051.059.200 – daunorubicin
- MeSH D09.408.051.059.200.150 – carubicin
- MeSH D09.408.051.059.200.175 – doxorubicin
- MeSH D09.408.051.059.200.175.200 – epirubicin
- MeSH D09.408.051.059.200.300 – idarubicin
- MeSH D09.408.051.059.200.650 – nogalamycin
- MeSH D09.408.051.059.200.650.500 – menogaril
- MeSH D09.408.051.059.650 – plicamycin
- MeSH D09.408.051.059.825 – pradimicins and benanomicins
- MeSH D09.408.051.120 – butirosin sulfate
- MeSH D09.408.051.247 – calicheamicins
- MeSH D09.408.051.247.500 – gemtuzumab
- MeSH D09.408.051.247.750 – inotuzumab ozogamicin
- MeSH D09.408.051.374 – gentamicins
- MeSH D09.408.051.374.785 – sisomicin
- MeSH D09.408.051.374.785.525 – netilmicin
- MeSH D09.408.051.420 – hygromycin b
- MeSH D09.408.051.476 – kanamycin
- MeSH D09.408.051.476.060 – amikacin
- MeSH D09.408.051.476.200 – dibekacin
- MeSH D09.408.051.476.600 – nebramycin
- MeSH D09.408.051.476.600.800 – tobramycin
- MeSH D09.408.051.476.600.800.500 – tobramycin, dexamethasone drug combination
- MeSH D09.408.051.545 – metrizamide
- MeSH D09.408.051.623 – neomycin
- MeSH D09.408.051.623.300 – framycetin
- MeSH D09.408.051.623.800 – ribostamycin
- MeSH D09.408.051.706 – paromomycin
- MeSH D09.408.051.788 – puromycin
- MeSH D09.408.051.788.650 – puromycin aminonucleoside
- MeSH D09.408.051.836 – spectinomycin
- MeSH D09.408.051.885 – streptomycin
- MeSH D09.408.051.885.387 – dihydrostreptomycin sulfate
- MeSH D09.408.051.892 – streptothricins
- MeSH D09.408.051.900 – streptozocin

==== MeSH D09.408.180 – cardiac glycosides ====
- MeSH D09.408.180.261 – digitalis glycosides
- MeSH D09.408.180.261.236 – digitonin
- MeSH D09.408.180.261.336 – digitoxin
- MeSH D09.408.180.261.336.259 – acetyldigitoxins
- MeSH D09.408.180.261.436 – digoxin
- MeSH D09.408.180.261.436.050 – acetyldigoxins
- MeSH D09.408.180.261.436.500 – medigoxin
- MeSH D09.408.180.261.657 – lanatosides
- MeSH D09.408.180.261.657.200 – deslanoside
- MeSH D09.408.180.660 – proscillaridin
- MeSH D09.408.180.810 – strophanthins
- MeSH D09.408.180.810.250 – cymarine
- MeSH D09.408.180.810.600 – ouabain

==== MeSH D09.408.210 – chromomycins ====
- MeSH D09.408.210.209 – chromomycin a3

==== MeSH D09.408.320 – galactosides ====
- MeSH D09.408.320.500 – methylgalactosides
- MeSH D09.408.320.550 – nitrophenylgalactosides
- MeSH D09.408.320.820 – thiogalactosides
- MeSH D09.408.320.820.500 – isopropyl thiogalactoside

==== MeSH D09.408.348 – glucosides ====
- MeSH D09.408.348.050 – amygdalin
- MeSH D09.408.348.075 – arbutin
- MeSH D09.408.348.113 – canagliflozin
- MeSH D09.408.348.150 – chloralose
- MeSH D09.408.348.250 – esculin
- MeSH D09.408.348.275 – etoposide
- MeSH D09.408.348.387 – iridoid glucosides
- MeSH D09.408.348.500 – methylglucosides
- MeSH D09.408.348.500.500 – 3-o-methylglucose
- MeSH D09.408.348.800 – teniposide
- MeSH D09.408.348.820 – thioglucosides
- MeSH D09.408.348.820.350 – glucosinolates

==== MeSH D09.408.423 – iridoid glycosides ====
- MeSH D09.408.423.500 – iridoid glucosides

==== MeSH D09.408.471 – lincosamides ====
- MeSH D09.408.471.500 – lincomycin
- MeSH D09.408.471.500.125 – clindamycin

==== MeSH D09.408.490 – mannosides ====
- MeSH D09.408.490.500 – methylmannosides

==== MeSH D09.408.514 – methylglycosides ====
- MeSH D09.408.514.455 – methylgalactosides
- MeSH D09.408.514.622 – methylglucosides
- MeSH D09.408.514.622.500 – 3-o-methylglucose
- MeSH D09.408.514.700 – methylmannosides

==== MeSH D09.408.620 – nucleotides ====
- MeSH D09.408.620.569 – nucleoside diphosphate sugars
- MeSH D09.408.620.569.070 – adenosine diphosphate sugars
- MeSH D09.408.620.569.070.075 – adenosine diphosphate glucose
- MeSH D09.408.620.569.070.125 – adenosine diphosphate ribose
- MeSH D09.408.620.569.070.125.040 – o-acetyl-adp-ribose
- MeSH D09.408.620.569.070.125.195 – cyclic adp-ribose
- MeSH D09.408.620.569.070.125.600 – poly adenosine diphosphate ribose
- MeSH D09.408.620.569.200 – cytidine diphosphate diglycerides
- MeSH D09.408.620.569.400 – guanosine diphosphate sugars
- MeSH D09.408.620.569.400.410 – guanosine diphosphate fucose
- MeSH D09.408.620.569.400.500 – guanosine diphosphate mannose
- MeSH D09.408.620.569.727 – uridine diphosphate sugars
- MeSH D09.408.620.569.727.100 – uridine diphosphate n-acetylgalactosamine
- MeSH D09.408.620.569.727.120 – uridine diphosphate n-acetylglucosamine
- MeSH D09.408.620.569.727.150 – uridine diphosphate n-acetylmuramic acid
- MeSH D09.408.620.569.727.300 – uridine diphosphate galactose
- MeSH D09.408.620.569.727.350 – uridine diphosphate glucose
- MeSH D09.408.620.569.727.375 – uridine diphosphate glucuronic acid
- MeSH D09.408.620.569.727.800 – uridine diphosphate xylose

==== MeSH D09.408.782 – saponins ====
- MeSH D09.408.782.250 – escin
- MeSH D09.408.782.300 – ginsenosides
- MeSH D09.408.782.350 – holothurin
- MeSH D09.408.782.512 – quillaja saponins
- MeSH D09.408.782.674 – solanine

==== MeSH D09.408.903 – thioglycosides ====
- MeSH D09.408.903.600 – thiogalactosides
- MeSH D09.408.903.600.500 – isopropyl thiogalactoside
- MeSH D09.408.903.703 – thioglucosides
- MeSH D09.408.903.703.350 – glucosinolates

=== MeSH D09.553 – imino sugars ===
==== MeSH D09.553.500 – imino pyranoses ====
- MeSH D09.553.500.033 – 1-deoxynojirimycin

=== MeSH D09.698 – polysaccharides ===
==== MeSH D09.698.068 – alginates ====
- MeSH D09.698.068.500 – alginic acid

==== MeSH D09.698.211 – chitin ====
- MeSH D09.698.211.500 – chitosan

==== MeSH D09.698.350 – fructans ====
- MeSH D09.698.350.500 – inulin

==== MeSH D09.698.360 – galactans ====
- MeSH D09.698.360.041 – agar

==== MeSH D09.698.365 – glucans ====
- MeSH D09.698.365.089 – beta-glucans
- MeSH D09.698.365.089.500 – lentinan
- MeSH D09.698.365.089.625 – sizofiran
- MeSH D09.698.365.089.750 – zymosan
- MeSH D09.698.365.180 – cellulose
- MeSH D09.698.365.180.180 – cellobiose
- MeSH D09.698.365.180.200 – cellulose, oxidized
- MeSH D09.698.365.180.247 – deae-cellulose
- MeSH D09.698.365.180.455 – hypromellose derivatives
- MeSH D09.698.365.180.663 – methylcellulose
- MeSH D09.698.365.180.663.329 – carboxymethylcellulose sodium
- MeSH D09.698.365.272 – dextrans
- MeSH D09.698.365.272.250 – deae-dextran
- MeSH D09.698.365.272.300 – dextran sulfate
- MeSH D09.698.365.272.400 – iron-dextran complex
- MeSH D09.698.365.388 – glycogen
- MeSH D09.698.365.388.518 – liver glycogen
- MeSH D09.698.365.399 – icodextrin
- MeSH D09.698.365.410 – isomaltose
- MeSH D09.698.365.450 – maltose
- MeSH D09.698.365.855 – starch
- MeSH D09.698.365.855.194 – amylopectin
- MeSH D09.698.365.855.361 – amylose
- MeSH D09.698.365.855.400 – dextrins
- MeSH D09.698.365.855.400.375 – cyclodextrins
- MeSH D09.698.365.855.400.375.222 – alpha-cyclodextrins
- MeSH D09.698.365.855.400.375.333 – beta-cyclodextrins
- MeSH D09.698.365.855.400.375.333.500 – 2-hydroxypropyl-beta-cyclodextrin
- MeSH D09.698.365.855.400.375.444 – gamma-cyclodextrins
- MeSH D09.698.365.855.400.375.444.500 – sugammadex
- MeSH D09.698.365.855.500 – hydroxyethyl starch derivatives
- MeSH D09.698.365.855.750 – inulin
- MeSH D09.698.365.855.875 – resistant starch
- MeSH D09.698.365.900 – trehalose

==== MeSH D09.698.373 – glycosaminoglycans ====
- MeSH D09.698.373.200 – chondroitin
- MeSH D09.698.373.200.300 – chondroitin sulfates
- MeSH D09.698.373.200.380 – dermatan sulfate
- MeSH D09.698.373.400 – heparin
- MeSH D09.698.373.400.300 – heparin, low-molecular-weight
- MeSH D09.698.373.400.300.150 – dalteparin
- MeSH D09.698.373.400.300.200 – enoxaparin
- MeSH D09.698.373.400.300.600 – nadroparin
- MeSH D09.698.373.400.300.800 – tinzaparin
- MeSH D09.698.373.400.320 – heparinoids
- MeSH D09.698.373.425 – heparan sulfate
- MeSH D09.698.373.425.500 – heparan sulfate proteoglycans
- MeSH D09.698.373.475 – hyaluronic acid
- MeSH D09.698.373.550 – keratan sulfate

==== MeSH D09.698.629 – oligosaccharides ====
- MeSH D09.698.629.305 – disaccharides
- MeSH D09.698.629.305.200 – cellobiose
- MeSH D09.698.629.305.320 – isomaltose
- MeSH D09.698.629.305.340 – lactose
- MeSH D09.698.629.305.423 – lactulose
- MeSH D09.698.629.305.523 – maltose
- MeSH D09.698.629.305.540 – melibiose
- MeSH D09.698.629.305.770 – sucrose
- MeSH D09.698.629.305.770.200 – dietary sucrose
- MeSH D09.698.629.305.770.850 – sucralfate
- MeSH D09.698.629.305.880 – trehalose
- MeSH D09.698.629.429 – fondaparinux
- MeSH D09.698.629.553 – oligosaccharides, branched-chain
- MeSH D09.698.629.802 – trisaccharides
- MeSH D09.698.629.802.100 – acarbose
- MeSH D09.698.629.802.700 – raffinose

==== MeSH D09.698.670 – pectins ====
- MeSH D09.698.670.500 – rhamnogalacturonans

==== MeSH D09.698.700 – plant gums ====
- MeSH D09.698.700.249 – chewing gum
- MeSH D09.698.700.249.500 – nicotine chewing gum
- MeSH D09.698.700.500 – gum arabic
- MeSH D09.698.700.625 – karaya gum
- MeSH D09.698.700.750 – tragacanth

==== MeSH D09.698.718 – polysaccharides, bacterial ====
- MeSH D09.698.718.220 – bambermycins
- MeSH D09.698.718.450 – lipopolysaccharides
- MeSH D09.698.718.450.500 – lipid a
- MeSH D09.698.718.450.600 – o antigens
- MeSH D09.698.718.594 – peptidoglycan
- MeSH D09.698.718.622 – prebiotics
- MeSH D09.698.718.650 – prodigiozan
- MeSH D09.698.718.825 – teichoic acids

==== MeSH D09.698.735 – proteoglycans ====
- MeSH D09.698.735.200 – chondroitin sulfate proteoglycans
- MeSH D09.698.735.200.500 – aggrecans
- MeSH D09.698.735.200.563 – chondroitin sulfate proteoglycan 4
- MeSH D09.698.735.200.625 – hyaluronan receptors
- MeSH D09.698.735.200.750 – versicans
- MeSH D09.698.735.400 – heparan sulfate proteoglycans
- MeSH D09.698.735.550 – proteoglycan 4
- MeSH D09.698.735.625 – proteoglycan link protein
- MeSH D09.698.735.700 – small leucine-rich proteoglycans
- MeSH D09.698.735.700.500 – biglycan
- MeSH D09.698.735.700.750 – decorin
- MeSH D09.698.735.700.813 – fibromodulin
- MeSH D09.698.735.700.875 – lumican

=== MeSH D09.811 – sugar acids ===
==== MeSH D09.811.100 – ascorbic acid ====
- MeSH D09.811.100.260 – dehydroascorbic acid

==== MeSH D09.811.295 – glucaric acid ====
- MeSH D09.811.295.500 – ferric oxide, saccharated

==== MeSH D09.811.308 – gluconates ====
- MeSH D09.811.308.060 – antimony sodium gluconate
- MeSH D09.811.308.200 – calcium gluconate

==== MeSH D09.811.366 – glyceric acids ====
- MeSH D09.811.366.388 – diphosphoglyceric acids
- MeSH D09.811.366.388.175 – 2,3-diphosphoglycerate

==== MeSH D09.811.522 – muramic acids ====
- MeSH D09.811.522.050 – acetylmuramyl-alanyl-isoglutamine

==== MeSH D09.811.589 – neuraminic acids ====
- MeSH D09.811.589.668 – sialic acids
- MeSH D09.811.589.668.030 – n-acetylneuraminic acid
- MeSH D09.811.589.668.250 – cytidine monophosphate n-acetylneuraminic acid
- MeSH D09.811.589.668.775 – zanamivir

==== MeSH D09.811.922 – uronic acids ====
- MeSH D09.811.922.162 – glucuronates
- MeSH D09.811.922.162.500 – glucuronic acid
- MeSH D09.811.922.162.500.500 – alginic acid
- MeSH D09.811.922.162.750 – glucuronides
- MeSH D09.811.922.400 – hexuronic acids
- MeSH D09.811.922.400.250 – alginic acid
- MeSH D09.811.922.400.500 – iduronic acid

=== MeSH D09.853 – sugar alcohols ===
==== MeSH D09.853.329 – erythritol ====
- MeSH D09.853.329.225 – erythrityl tetranitrate

==== MeSH D09.853.400 – galactitol ====
- MeSH D09.853.400.350 – dianhydrogalactitol
- MeSH D09.853.400.500 – mitolactol

==== MeSH D09.853.519 – inositol ====
- MeSH D09.853.519.400 – inositol phosphates
- MeSH D09.853.519.400.350 – inositol 1,4,5-trisphosphate
- MeSH D09.853.519.400.700 – phytic acid

==== MeSH D09.853.609 – mannitol ====
- MeSH D09.853.609.450 – mannitol phosphates
- MeSH D09.853.609.500 – mitobronitol

==== MeSH D09.853.813 – sorbitol ====
- MeSH D09.853.813.480 – isosorbide
- MeSH D09.853.813.480.500 – isosorbide dinitrate
- MeSH D09.853.813.550 – meglumine
- MeSH D09.853.813.550.500 – diatrizoate meglumine
- MeSH D09.853.813.550.600 – iothalamate meglumine
- MeSH D09.853.813.550.800 – meglumine antimoniate

==== MeSH D09.853.875 – triose sugar alcohols ====
- MeSH D09.853.875.500 – glycerol
- MeSH D09.853.875.750 – glycerophosphates
- MeSH D09.853.875.750.449 – glycerylphosphorylcholine

=== MeSH D09.894 – sugar phosphates ===
==== MeSH D09.894.417 – hexosephosphates ====
- MeSH D09.894.417.313 – fructosephosphates
- MeSH D09.894.417.313.300 – fructosediphosphates
- MeSH D09.894.417.370 – galactosephosphates
- MeSH D09.894.417.448 – glucosephosphates
- MeSH D09.894.417.448.500 – glucose-6-phosphate
- MeSH D09.894.417.592 – hexosediphosphates
- MeSH D09.894.417.592.300 – fructosediphosphates
- MeSH D09.894.417.650 – mannosephosphates

==== MeSH D09.894.480 – inositol phosphates ====
- MeSH D09.894.480.350 – inositol 1,4,5-trisphosphate
- MeSH D09.894.480.700 – phytic acid

==== MeSH D09.894.643 – pentosephosphates ====
- MeSH D09.894.643.650 – phosphoribosyl pyrophosphate
- MeSH D09.894.643.700 – ribosemonophosphates
- MeSH D09.894.643.720 – ribulosephosphates

==== MeSH D09.894.680 – polyisoprenyl phosphate sugars ====
- MeSH D09.894.680.700 – polyisoprenyl phosphate monosaccharides
- MeSH D09.894.680.700.250 – dolichol monophosphate mannose
- MeSH D09.894.680.710 – polyisoprenyl phosphate oligosaccharides

=== MeSH D09.947 – sugars ===
==== MeSH D09.947.500 – dietary sugars ====
- MeSH D09.947.500.250 – dietary sucrose
- MeSH D09.947.500.500 – high fructose corn syrup

==== MeSH D09.947.750 – disaccharides ====
- MeSH D09.947.750.200 – cellobiose
- MeSH D09.947.750.320 – isomaltose
- MeSH D09.947.750.340 – lactose
- MeSH D09.947.750.423 – lactulose
- MeSH D09.947.750.523 – maltose
- MeSH D09.947.750.540 – melibiose
- MeSH D09.947.750.770 – sucrose
- MeSH D09.947.750.770.200 – dietary sucrose
- MeSH D09.947.750.770.850 – sucralfate
- MeSH D09.947.750.880 – trehalose

==== MeSH D09.947.875 – monosaccharides ====
- MeSH D09.947.875.286 – heptoses
- MeSH D09.947.875.286.500 – mannoheptulose
- MeSH D09.947.875.359 – hexoses
- MeSH D09.947.875.359.250 – fructose
- MeSH D09.947.875.359.250.500 – topiramate
- MeSH D09.947.875.359.377 – galactose
- MeSH D09.947.875.359.448 – glucose
- MeSH D09.947.875.359.448.500 – blood glucose
- MeSH D09.947.875.359.588 – mannose
- MeSH D09.947.875.359.588.001 – rhamnose
- MeSH D09.947.875.359.862 – sorbose
- MeSH D09.947.875.465 – ketoses
- MeSH D09.947.875.465.200 – dihydroxyacetone
- MeSH D09.947.875.465.354 – fructose
- MeSH D09.947.875.465.354.500 – topiramate
- MeSH D09.947.875.465.500 – mannoheptulose
- MeSH D09.947.875.465.758 – sorbose
- MeSH D09.947.875.465.920 – xylulose
- MeSH D09.947.875.627 – pentoses
- MeSH D09.947.875.627.166 – arabinose
- MeSH D09.947.875.627.409 – rhamnose
- MeSH D09.947.875.627.651 – ribose
- MeSH D09.947.875.627.867 – xylose
- MeSH D09.947.875.627.885 – xylulose
- MeSH D09.947.875.805 – tetroses
- MeSH D09.947.875.894 – trioses
- MeSH D09.947.875.894.200 – dihydroxyacetone
- MeSH D09.947.875.894.449 – glyceraldehyde

=== MeSH D09.973 – thiosugars ===
The list continues at List of MeSH codes (D10).
