= C11H9I3N2O4 =

The molecular formula C_{11}H_{9}I_{3}N_{2}O_{4} (molar mass: 613.914 g/mol, exact mass: 613.7697 u) may refer to:

- Diatrizoate
- Iotalamic acid
