= C7H14O7 =

The molecular formula C_{7}H_{14}O_{7} (molar mass: 210.18 g/mol, exact mass: 210.0740 u) may refer to:

- Mannoheptulose
- Sedoheptulose, or D-altro-heptulose
