= Raw banana bajji =

South Indian snacks

Raw banana Bajji
- Raw banana bajji
- Cooking time: 30 minutes to 40 minutes
- Main ingredients: Gram/besan flour, raw banana, cooking oil
- Ingredients generally used: Cumin seeds, ajwain, salt
- Variations: Potato bajji, onion bajji, chilli bajji, egg bajji, eggplant bajji
- Similar dishes: Pazham pori

Raw banana bajji or (bajji) is a snack commonly sold at tea stalls across Tamil Nadu during the evening hours.

== Preparation ==
In a bowl, combine gram flour (besan), ajwain seeds, cumin seeds, salt, and a pinch of baking soda; add enough water to mix it into a batter—ideally, the consistency should be somewhat thin. Slice the raw plantains into thin pieces. Heat a sufficient amount of oil in a wide pan; once the oil is hot, dip the plantain slices into the prepared batter, drop them into the hot oil, and fry until crispy. These are commonly served with coconut chutney or tomato chutney; they are a popular evening snack enjoyed both at shops and in homes.

== Varieties ==
This type of fritter (bajji) can be made using various vegetables—such as chili, onion, potato, and eggplant—as well as many others.

== Gallery ==
Potato bajji

== See also ==
- Banana fritter
- Pazham pori
