= Streptomyces glomeratus =

Scientific classification
- Domain: Bacteria
- Kingdom: Bacillati
- Phylum: Actinomycetota
- Class: Actinomycetes
- Order: Streptomycetales
- Family: Streptomycetaceae
- Genus: Streptomyces
- Species: S. glomeratus

Binomial name
- Streptomyces glomeratus Gause and Preobrazhenskaya 1986

Type strain
- CGMCC 4.1940, DSM 41457, IFO 15898, INA 3980, JCM 9091, LMG 19903, NBRC 15898, VKM Ac-834

Species of bacterium

Streptomyces glomeratus is a bacterium species from the genus of Streptomyces. Streptomyces glomeratus produces beromycin and nogalamycin.

== See also ==
- List of Streptomyces species
