= Streptomyces nogalater =

Scientific classification
- Domain: Bacteria
- Kingdom: Bacillati
- Phylum: Actinomycetota
- Class: Actinomycetes
- Order: Streptomycetales
- Family: Streptomycetaceae
- Genus: Streptomyces
- Species: S. nogalater

Binomial name
- Streptomyces nogalater Bhuyan and Dietz 1966

Type strain
- AS 4.1442, ATCC 27451, BCRC 12316, CBS 238.69, CBS 746.72, CCRC 12316, CGMCC 4.1442, CGMCC 4.2114, DSM 40546, HAMBI 951, IFO 13445, IMET 43360, ISP 5546, JCM 4553, JCM 4799, KCC S-0553, KCC S-0779, KCC S-0799, KCCS-0553, KCCS-0779, Lanoot R-8702, LMG 19338, LMG 5981, NBRC 101833, NBRC 13445, NCIMB 9489, NRRL 3035, NRRL B-3035, NRRL-ISP 5546, R-8702, RIA 1406, UC 2783, VKM Ac-1290

Species of bacterium

Streptomyces nogalater is a bacterium species from the genus of Streptomyces. Streptomyces nogalater produces nogalamycin.

== See also ==
- List of Streptomyces species
