= Raw banana =

Tropical, stable food

A Raw banana or green plantain refers to the fruit in an unripened state. The subsequent stage is described as 'half-ripened,' and the progression from this point to becoming fully ripe represents a natural process of growth and maturation.

== History ==
Saba bananas - raw banana

main article: Banana

The history of the green banana is documented through peer-reviewed research papers, books, and historical evidence spanning various eras. Archaeobotanical studies confirm that, approximately 6,950–6,440 years ago "cal BP", bananas of the genus "Musa" were intentionally cultivated and domesticated by the people at Kuk Swamp, located in the Western Highlands of Papua New Guinea.Early farmers developed seedless, starchy, cooking-type banana varieties from the wild species "Musa acuminata" and "Musa balbisiana". Research has identified a cytogenetic classification—based on genome groups such as AA, AB, AAB, and ABB—that distinguishes between sweet, dessert-type bananas and starchy, cooking-type bananas. In the 'Great Lakes' region of Africa and in West Africa, green cooking bananas serve as a staple food.

== Nutrition ==
The 'resistant starch'—a type of dietary fiber—along with potassium and vitamins found in raw bananas, is considered highly beneficial for blood sugar control, gut health, and weight loss.

Key Nutrients in Raw Banana (per 100 grams)

- Resistant starch: Approximately 9.3 – 16 grams (significantly higher than in ripe bananas).
- Dietary fiber: Approximately 2.6 – 3 grams (including pectin and cellulose).
- Potassium: About 9% of the daily requirement (a mineral that helps regulate blood pressure).
- Vitamin B6: About 25% of the daily requirement (supports the nervous system and metabolism).
- Vitamin C: About 11% of the daily requirement (aids in immune function).
- Magnesium & Manganese: 7% and 14% of the daily requirement, respectively.

== Benefits ==
Benefits include:

- Blood Sugar Control (Glycemic Index around 30–42): It contains 'Type 2 Resistant Starch' (RS2), which is not easily digested in the small intestine; this helps ensure that glucose enters the bloodstream more slowly.
- Medical studies have shown that when individuals with diabetes include raw banana flour or porridge in their diet, their HbA1c levels and fasting blood sugar levels decrease significantly.
- Gut Health and Digestion: The resistant starch and pectin found in raw bananas act as 'prebiotics,' providing nourishment for the beneficial bacteria in the large intestine. Through fermentation, these produce a fatty acid known as 'butyrate.'
- Weight Loss: The fiber content in raw bananas slows down the rate at which the stomach empties, creating a feeling of fullness and keeping hunger at bay for longer periods.
- Heart Health and Cholesterol Reduction: Potassium and magnesium help reduce pressure in the blood vessels. Furthermore, resistant starch aids in the elimination of 'bad' (LDL) cholesterol.
