= Menogaril =

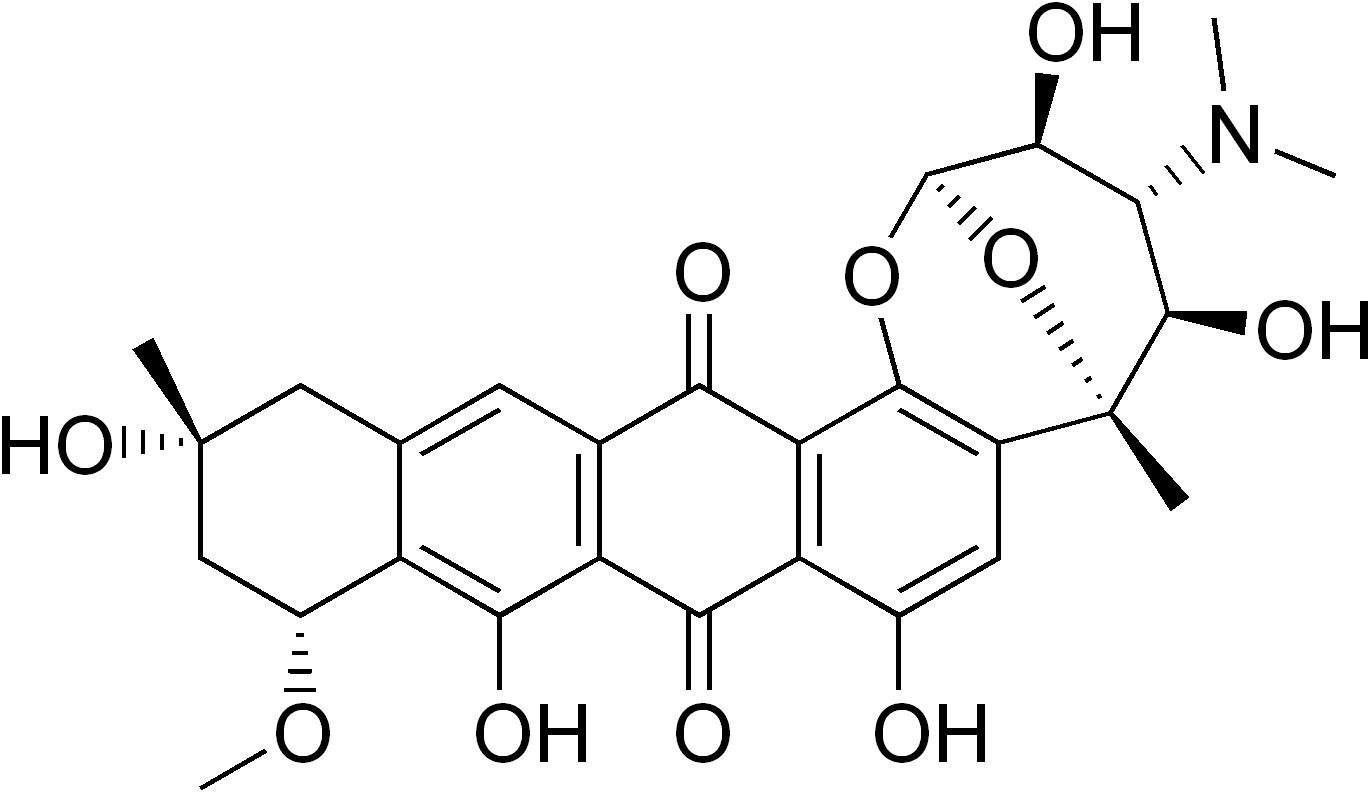

Names
- Other names 7-O-Methylnogarol

Identifiers
CAS Number	71628-96-1
3D model (JSmol)	Interactive image
ChEMBL	ChEMBL1234391
ChemSpider	4450900
PubChem CID	5288818
UNII	8JSV4O30HQ
CompTox Dashboard (EPA)	DTXSID601024504
- InChI: InChI=1S/C28H31NO10/c1-27(36)8-10-6-11-16(21(32)15(10)14(9-27)37-5)22(33)17-13(30)7-12-24(18(17)20(11)31)38-26-23(34)19(29(3)4)25(35)28(12,2)39-26/h6-7,14,19,23,25-26,30,32,34-36H,8-9H2,1-5H3/t14-,19+,23+,25-,26-,27-,28-/m1/s1 Key: LWYJUZBXGAFFLP-OCNCTQISSA-N; InChI=1/C28H31NO10/c1-27(36)8-10-6-11-16(21(32)15(10)14(9-27)37-5)22(33)17-13(30)7-12-24(18(17)20(11)31)38-26-23(34)19(29(3)4)25(35)28(12,2)39-26/h6-7,14,19,23,25-26,30,32,34-36H,8-9H2,1-5H3/t14-,19+,23+,25-,26-,27-,28-/m1/s1 Key: LWYJUZBXGAFFLP-OCNCTQISBR
- SMILES: CO[C@@H]1C[C@](C)(O)Cc2cc3c(c(O)c21)C(=O)c1c(O)cc2c(c1C3=O)O[C@@H]1O[C@@]2(C)[C@H](O)[C@@H](N(C)C)[C@@H]1O

Properties
Chemical formula	C_{28}H_{31}NO_{10}
Molar mass	541.55 g/mol
- Except where otherwise noted, data are given for materials in their standard state (at 25 °C [77 °F], 100 kPa). verify (what is ?) Infobox references

Menogaril is an anthracycline analog of nogalamycin which was developed in late 1970s. It has even stronger anticancer activity, and less toxicity, than nogalamycin. However, its development for clinical use was cancelled due to only moderate success with relatively high incidence of serious toxicity (43-44% in non-Hodgkin's lymphoma patients).
