= Oligodendrocyte-myelin glycoprotein =

Protein-coding gene in the species Homo sapiens

OMG

Identifiers
- Aliases: OMG, OMGP, oligodendrocyte myelin glycoprotein
- External IDs: OMIM: 164345; MGI: 106586; HomoloGene: 36099; GeneCards: OMG; OMA:OMG - orthologs

Gene location (Mouse)
| Chr. | Chromosome 11 (mouse) |
| Band | 11 B5|11 46.79 cM | Start | 79,391,808 bp |
| Band | 11 B5|11 46.79 cM | End | 79,394,910 bp |
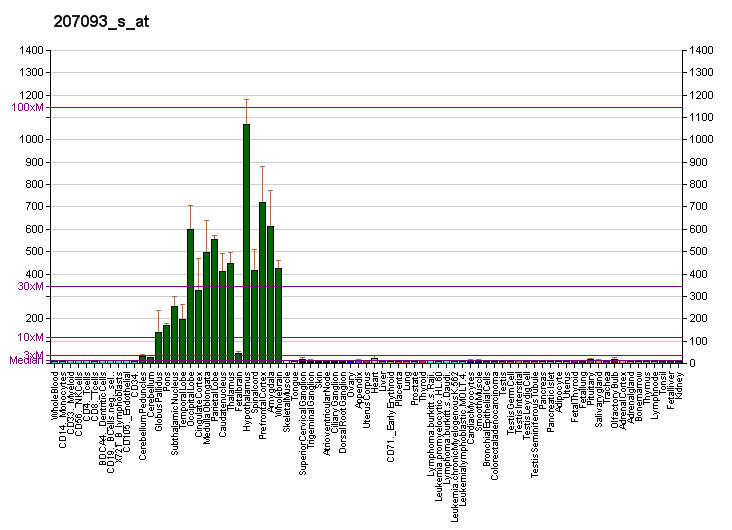
RNA expression pattern
| Bgee | Human / Mouse (ortholog); Top expressed in: bronchial epithelial cell; postcentral gyrus; external globus pallidus; pons; Brodmann area 46; corpus callosum; middle frontal gyrus; subthalamic nucleus; orbitofrontal cortex; inferior ganglion of vagus nerve / Top expressed in: anterior horn of spinal cord; deep cerebellar nuclei; globus pallidus; lateral geniculate nucleus; primary visual cortex; superior frontal gyrus; medial dorsal nucleus; lumbar subsegment of spinal cord; primary motor cortex; piriform cortex; More reference expression data |
| BioGPS | More reference expression data |
Orthologs
| Species | Human | Mouse |
| Entrez | 4974 | 18377 |
| Ensembl | n/a | ENSMUSG00000049612 |
| UniProt | P23515 | Q63912 |
| RefSeq (mRNA) | NM_002544 | NM_019409 |
| RefSeq (protein) | NP_002535 | NP_062282 |
| Location (UCSC) | n/a | Chr 11: 79.39 – 79.39 Mb |
| PubMed search |
- Wikidata
| View/Edit Human | View/Edit Mouse |

Oligodendrocyte-myelin glycoprotein is a protein that in humans is encoded by the OMG gene.

== See also ==
- Oligodendrocyte
- Myelin
- Glycoprotein
