= Methylglucoside =

α-D-Methylglucoside
β-D-Methylglucoside

Names
- IUPAC name Methyl D-glucopyranoside
- Other names 1-O-Methyl-D-glucopyranose

Identifiers
CAS Number	3149-68-6; 97-30-3 (α); 709-50-2 (β)
3D model (JSmol)	Interactive image
ChemSpider	2300694
ECHA InfoCard	100.019.620
PubChem CID	3036743
UNII	54L5T38NI8; QCF122NF3R (α)
CompTox Dashboard (EPA)	DTXSID4027523
- InChI: InChI=1S/C7H14O6/c1-12-7-6(11)5(10)4(9)3(2-8)13-7/h3-11H,2H2,1H3/t3-,4-,5+,6-,7?/m1/s1 Key: HOVAGTYPODGVJG-WLDMJGECSA-N; InChI=1/C7H14O6/c1-12-7-6(11)5(10)4(9)3(2-8)13-7/h3-11H,2H2,1H3/t3-,4-,5+,6-,7?/m1/s1 Key: HOVAGTYPODGVJG-WLDMJGECBG
- SMILES: O[C@@H]1[C@@H](O)[C@H](O)[C@H](OC1OC)CO

Properties
Chemical formula	C_{7}H_{14}O_{6}
Molar mass	194.183 g·mol^{−1}
Appearance	White crystalline solid
Density	1.46 g/cm^{3} (α)
Melting point	168 °C (334 °F; 441 K) (α)
Solubility in water	108 g/100 mL
- Except where otherwise noted, data are given for materials in their standard state (at 25 °C [77 °F], 100 kPa). Infobox references

Methylglucoside is a monosaccharide derived from glucose. It can be prepared in the laboratory by the acid-catalyzed reaction of glucose with methanol.

It is used as a chemical intermediate in the production of a variety of products including emollients, emulsifiers, humectants, moisturizers, thickening agents, plasticizers, surfactants, varnishes, and resins. The formation of methyl glycoside indicates that the structure of glucose is not open chain.
