= Muramic acid =

Names
- Preferred IUPAC name 2-[3-Amino-2,5-dihydroxy-6-(hydroxymethyl)oxan-4-yl]oxypropanoic acid
- Systematic IUPAC name 2-{[3-Amino-2,5-dihydroxy-6-(hydroxymethyl)oxan-4-yl]oxy}propanoic acid

Identifiers
CAS Number	1114-41-6
3D model (JSmol)	Interactive image
Beilstein Reference	2334586
ChEBI	CHEBI:7027
ChemSpider	7992151 α-muramic acid; 389857 muramic acid (mixture of anomers); 394190 β-muramic acid
ECHA InfoCard	100.012.923
EC Number	214-214-9
KEGG	C06470
PubChem CID	441038 (2R),(3R,4R,5S,6R); 12313001 (),(3R,4R,5S,6R); 44123550 (2R),(2R,4R,6R); 45039974 (2R),(); 433580
UNII	D42T32747Z
CompTox Dashboard (EPA)	DTXSID60862545
- InChI: InChI=1S/C9H17NO7/c1-3(8(13)14)16-7-5(10)9(15)17-4(2-11)6(7)12/h3-7,9,11-12,15H,2,10H2,1H3,(H,13,14)/t3-,4-,5-,6-,7-,9-/m1/s1 Key: MSFSPUZXLOGKHJ-KTZFPWNASA-N
- SMILES: CC(OC1C(N)C(O)OC(CO)C1O)C(O)=O

Properties
Chemical formula	C_{9}H_{17}NO_{7}
Molar mass	251.23378
- Except where otherwise noted, data are given for materials in their standard state (at 25 °C [77 °F], 100 kPa). verify (what is ?) Infobox references

Muramic acid is an amino sugar acid. In terms of chemical composition, it is the ether of lactic acid and glucosamine. It occurs naturally as N-acetylmuramic acid in peptidoglycan, whose primary function is a structural component of many typical bacterial cell walls.
