= Syndecan-3 =

Protein found in humans

SDC3

Identifiers
- Aliases: SDC3, SDCN, SYND3, syndecan 3
- External IDs: OMIM: 186357; MGI: 1349163; GeneCards: SDC3

Gene location (Human)
Chr.	Chromosome 1 (human)
Band	1p35.2	Start	30,869,466 bp
Band	1p35.2	End	30,908,758 bp

Gene location (Mouse)
Chr.	Chromosome 4 (mouse)
Band	4 D2.2|4 63.63 cM	Start	130,519,848 bp
Band	4 D2.2|4 63.63 cM	End	130,553,630 bp
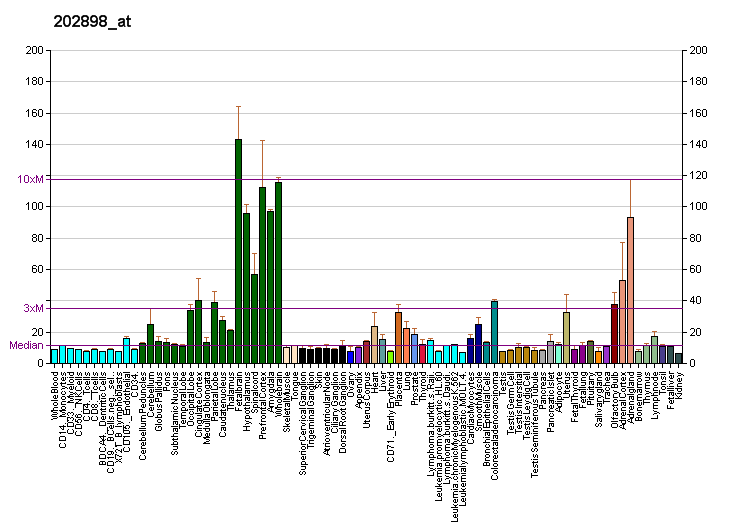
RNA expression pattern
Bgee	Human / Mouse (ortholog); Top expressed in: right adrenal cortex; left adrenal cortex; nucleus accumbens; amygdala; caudate nucleus; anterior cingulate cortex; hypothalamus; putamen; right frontal lobe; left uterine tube / Top expressed in: calvaria; stroma of bone marrow; adrenal gland; molar; dentate gyrus of hippocampal formation granule cell; body of femur; mesenteric lymph nodes; visual cortex; olfactory epithelium; primary visual cortex; More reference expression data
BioGPS	More reference expression data
Gene ontology
Molecular function	protein binding; identical protein binding
Cellular component	integral component of membrane; membrane; plasma membrane; lysosomal lumen; Golgi lumen; cell surface; extracellular matrix; collagen-containing extracellular matrix; microspike
Biological process	glycosaminoglycan metabolic process; retinoid metabolic process; glycosaminoglycan catabolic process; glycosaminoglycan biosynthetic process; leukocyte migration; cell migration
Sources:Amigo / QuickGO
Orthologs
Databases	NCBI: entry; OMA: entry
Species	Human	Mouse
Entrez	9672	20970
Ensembl	ENSG00000162512	ENSMUSG00000025743
UniProt	O75056	Q64519
RefSeq (mRNA)	NM_014654	NM_011520
RefSeq (protein)	NP_055469	NP_035650
Location (UCSC)	Chr 1: 30.87 – 30.91 Mb	Chr 4: 130.52 – 130.55 Mb
PubMed search
- Wikidata
View/Edit Human	View/Edit Mouse

Syndecan-3 is a protein that in humans is encoded by the SDC3 gene.
