= Iotalamic acid =

Chemical compound

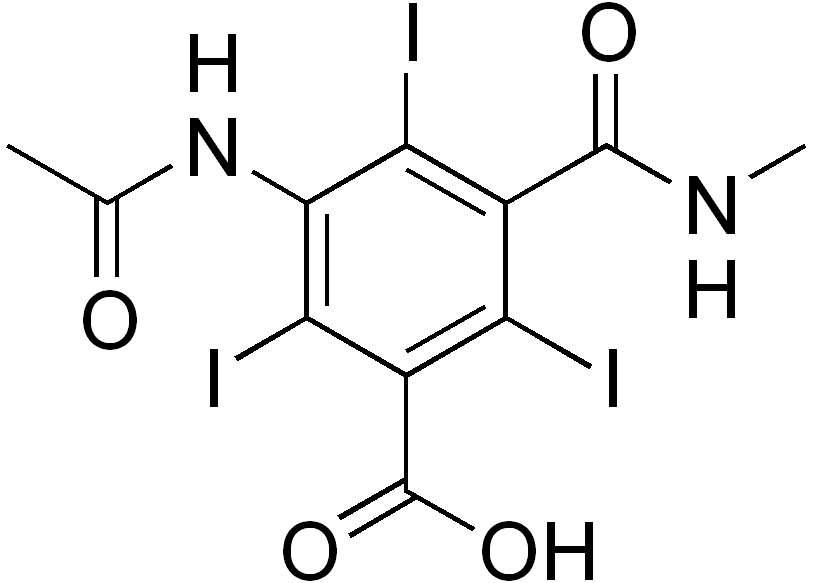

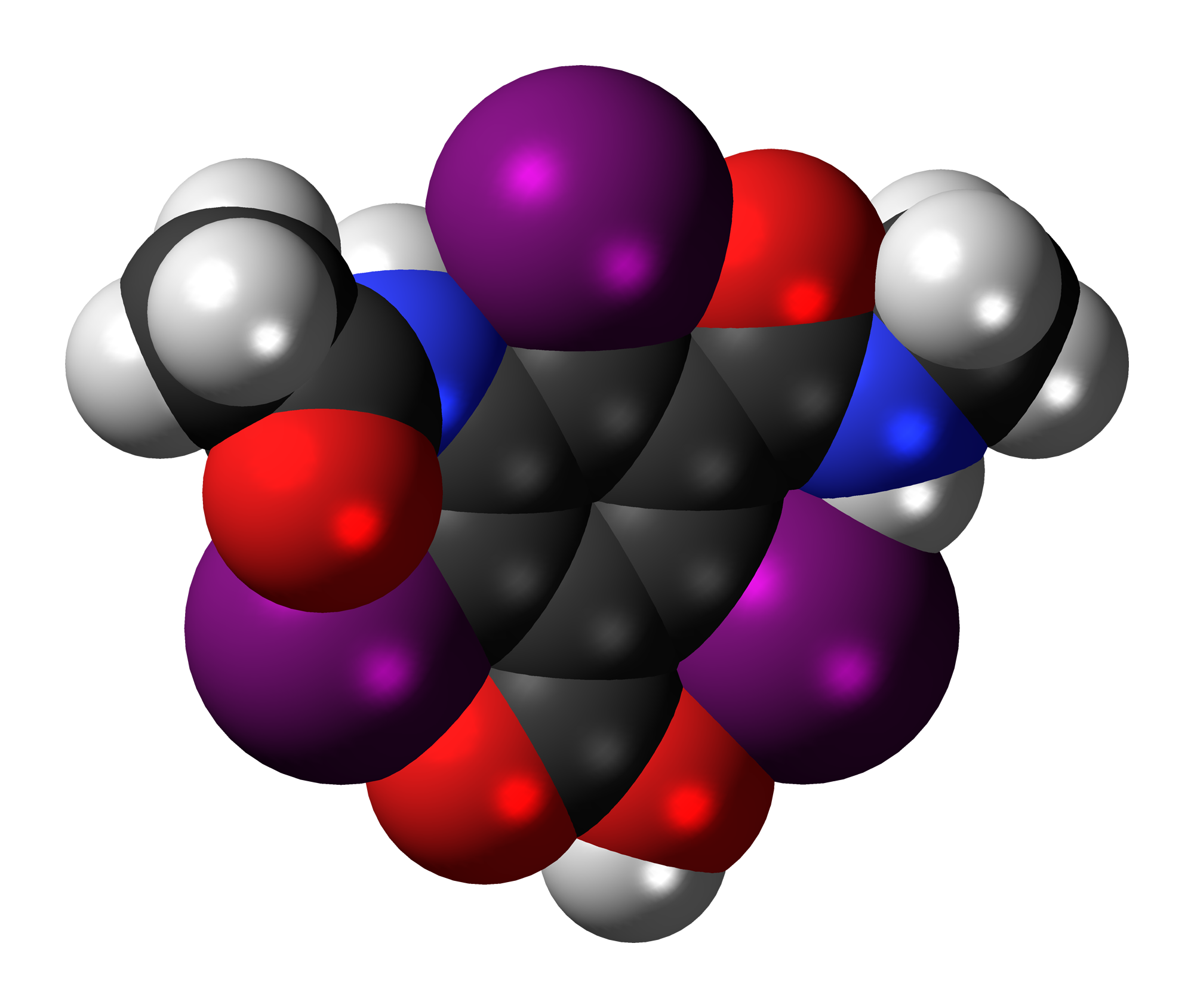

Clinical data
- Trade names: Conray, Glofil-125, Cysto-Conray II, others
- Other names: MI-216, iothalamate meglumine, iothalamic acid (USAN US)
- AHFS/Drugs.com: Consumer Drug Information
- License data: US DailyMed: Iothalamate
- Routes of administration: Intravascular
- ATC code: V08AA04 (WHO)

Legal status
- Legal status: US: ℞-only

Identifiers
- IUPAC name: 3-acetamido-2,4,6-triiodo-5-(methylcarbamoyl)benzoic acid
- CAS Number: 2276-90-6
- PubChem CID: 3737
- DrugBank: DB09133
- ChemSpider: 3606
- UNII: 16CHD79MIX
- KEGG: D01258
- ChEBI: CHEBI:31713
- ChEMBL: ChEMBL1201300
- CompTox Dashboard (EPA): DTXSID5023164
- ECHA InfoCard: 100.017.181

Chemical and physical data
- Formula: C_{11}H_{9}I_{3}N_{2}O_{4}
- Molar mass: 613.916 g·mol^{−1}
- 3D model (JSmol): Interactive image
- SMILES: CC(=O)NC1=C(C(=C(C(=C1I)C(=O)O)I)C(=O)NC)I
- InChI: InChI=1S/C11H9I3N2O4/c1-3(17)16-9-7(13)4(10(18)15-2)6(12)5(8(9)14)11(19)20/h1-2H3,(H,15,18)(H,16,17)(H,19,20); Key:UXIGWFXRQKWHHA-UHFFFAOYSA-N

Iothalamic acid, sold under the brand name Conray, is an iodine-containing radiocontrast agent. It is available in form of its salts, sodium iothalamate and meglumine iothalamate. It can be given intravenously or intravesically (into the urinary bladder).

A radioactive formulation is also available as sodium iothalamate I-125 injection (brand name Glofil-125). It is indicated for evaluation of glomerular filtration in the diagnosis or monitoring of people with kidney disease.
