= Mannoheptulose =

d-Mannoheptulose

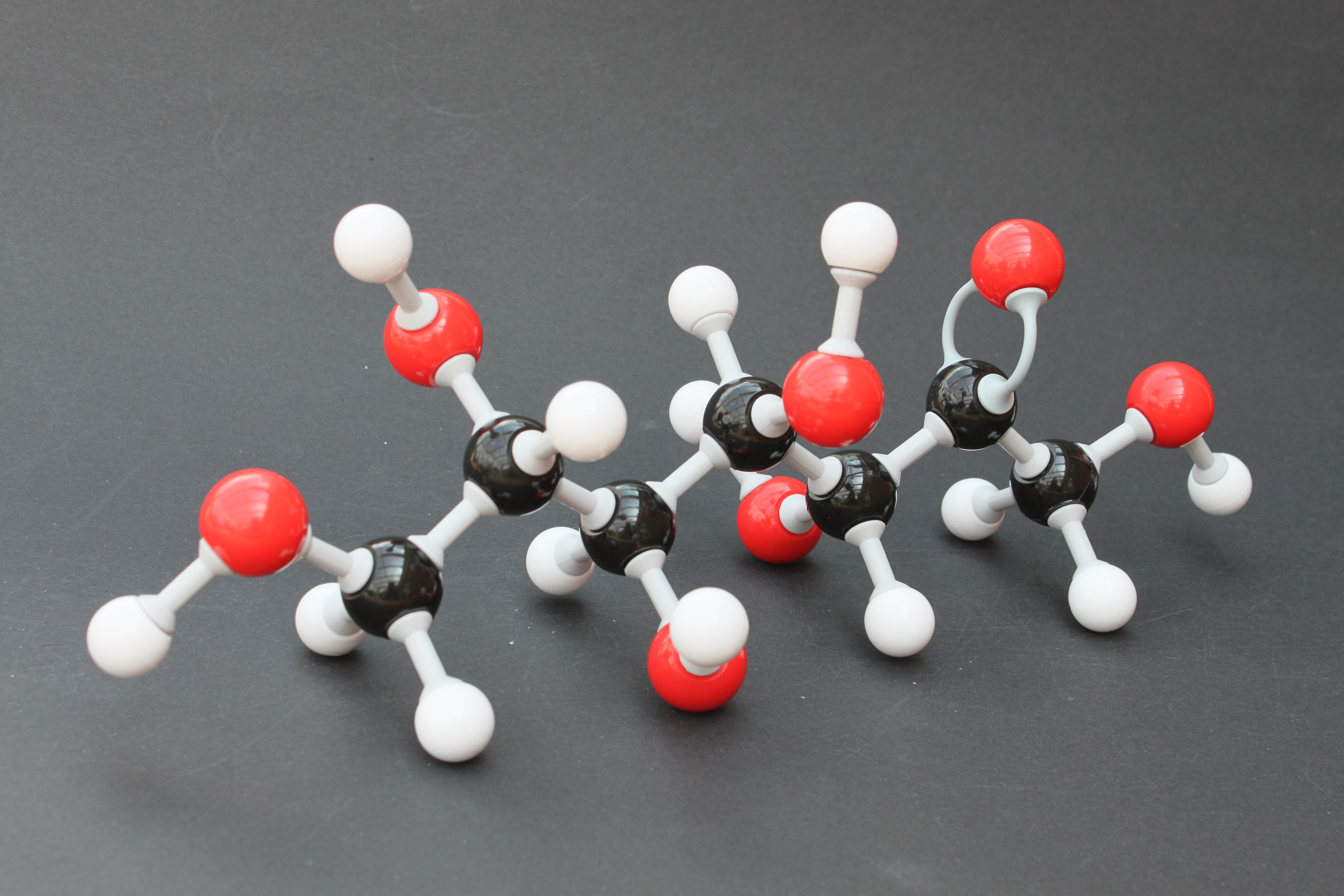

Names
- IUPAC name d-manno-Hept-2-ulose

Identifiers
CAS Number	3615-44-9
3D model (JSmol)	Interactive image
ChemSpider	12080
ECHA InfoCard	100.020.723
PubChem CID	12600
UNII	W19YH62373
CompTox Dashboard (EPA)	DTXSID60879012
- InChI: InChI=1S/C7H14O7/c8-1-3(10)5(12)7(14)6(13)4(11)2-9/h3,5-10,12-14H,1-2H2/t3-,5-,6-,7+/m1/s1 Key: HSNZZMHEPUFJNZ-QMTIVRBISA-N; InChI=1S/C7H14O7/c8-1-3(10)5(12)7(14)6(13)4(11)2-9/h3,5-10,12-14H,1-2H2/t3-,5-,6-,7+/m1/s1
- SMILES: O=C([C@@H](O)[C@@H](O)[C@H](O)[C@H](O)CO)CO

Properties
Chemical formula	C_{7}H_{14}O_{7}
Molar mass	210.182 g·mol^{−1}
Density	1.7 g cm^{−3}
- Except where otherwise noted, data are given for materials in their standard state (at 25 °C [77 °F], 100 kPa). verify (what is ?) Infobox references

Mannoheptulose is a heptose, a monosaccharide with seven carbon atoms, and a ketose, with the characteristic carbonyl group of the carbohydrate present on a secondary carbon (functioning as a ketone group). The sugar alcohol form of mannoheptulose is known as perseitol.

== Inhibition of hexokinases ==
Mannoheptulose is a competitive and non-competitive inhibitor of both hexokinase and the related liver isozyme glucokinase. By blocking the enzyme hexokinase, it prevents glucose phosphorylation, the first step in the fundamental biochemical pathway of glycolysis. As a result, the breakdown of glucose is inhibited.

Because of its inhibition of glycolysis in vitro, it has been investigated as a novel nutraceuticals for weight management for dogs. However, while mannoheptulose is suggested to affect the energy balance of adult dogs, independent of dosage and physical activity, research disagrees whether it significantly alters energy expenditure in dogs.

== Inhibition of insulin secretion ==
Mannoheptulose has been reported to inhibit insulin secretion from pancreas. This inhibition occurs because when mannoheptulose is present the glycolysis is inhibited (because there is no production of glucose-6-P) therefore no increase in ATP concentration which is required to close the KATP channel in the beta cells of the pancreas causing a diminution of calcium entry and insulin secretion.

== Natural occurrence ==
Mannoheptulose is naturally occurring in alfalfa, avocados, fig, and the primrose. Heptoses can make up over a tenth of the tissue dry weight of the avocado tree. Though the carbohydrate is thought to be produced during photosynthesis the precise biological pathway for the synthesis of mannoheptulose was unknown as of 2002. Like other sugars it is transported in the phloem.
