= Prebiotic =

Prebiotic may refer to:

- Prebiotic (chemistry), inorganic or organic chemistry in the natural environment before the advent of life on Earth
- Prebiotic (nutrition), non-digestible food ingredients

== See also ==
- Probiotic, live microorganisms claimed to provide health benefits when consumed
