= Diatrizoate =

Chemical compound

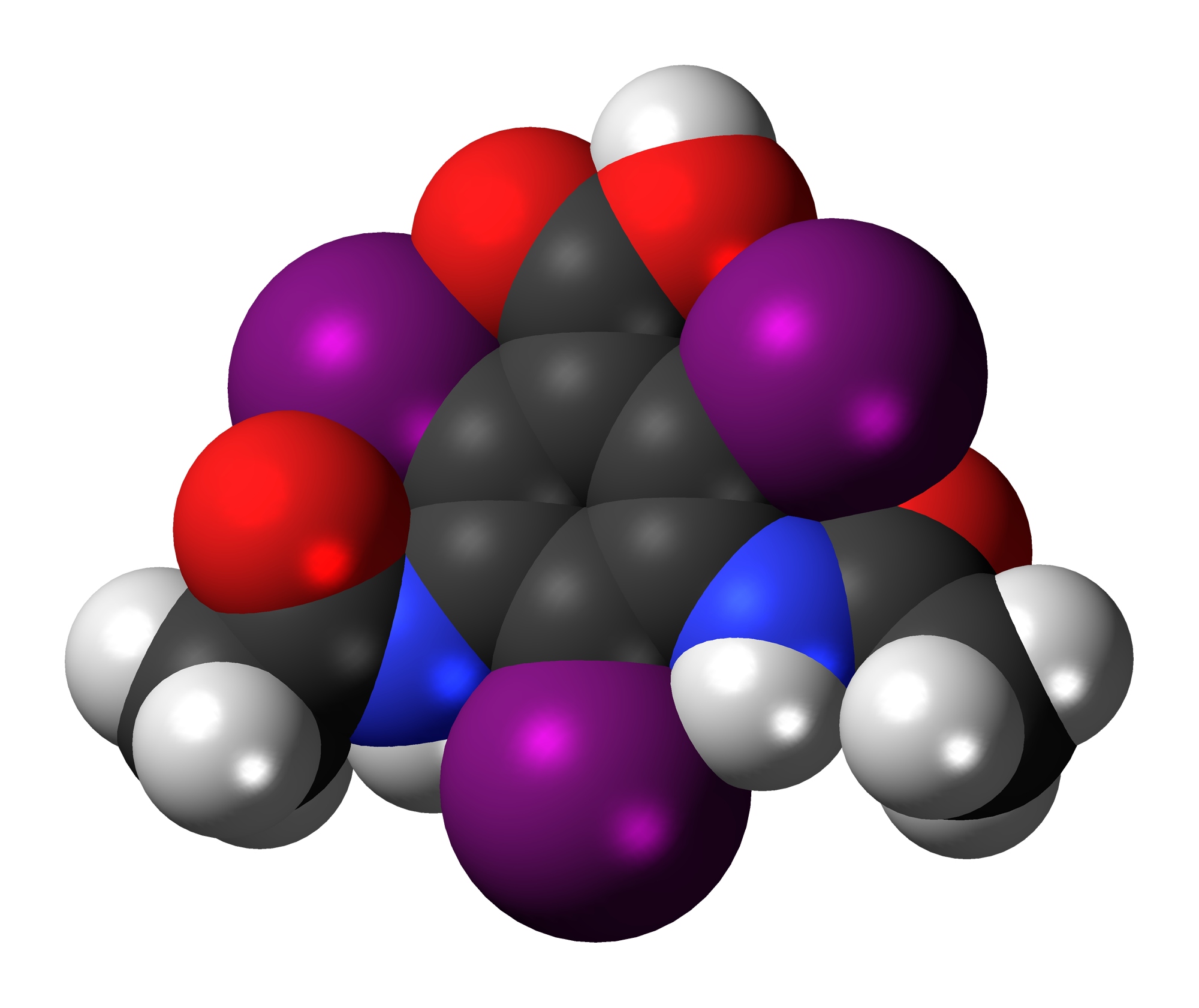

Clinical data
- Trade names: Hypaque, Gastrografin, Iothalmate, others
- Other names: amidotrizoic acid, diatrizoic acid, 3,5-diacetamido-2,4,6-triiodobenzoic acid
- AHFS/Drugs.com: Micromedex Detailed Consumer Information
- ATC code: V08AA01 (WHO)

Identifiers
- IUPAC name: 3,5-Bis(acetylamino)-2,4,6-triiodobenzoic acid
- CAS Number: 737-31-5
- PubChem CID: 2140
- DrugBank: DB00271
- ChemSpider: 2055
- UNII: 5UVC90J1LK; V5403H8VG7
- KEGG: D02240
- ChEBI: CHEBI:53691
- ChEMBL: ChEMBL1201220
- CompTox Dashboard (EPA): DTXSID0044521
- ECHA InfoCard: 100.003.840

Chemical and physical data
- Formula: C_{11}H_{9}I_{3}N_{2}O_{4}
- Molar mass: 613.916 g·mol^{−1}
- 3D model (JSmol): Interactive image
- SMILES: CC(=O)NC1=C(C(=C(C(=C1I)C(=O)O)I)NC(=O)C)I
- InChI: InChI=1S/C11H9I3N2O4/c1-3(17)15-9-6(12)5(11(19)20)7(13)10(8(9)14)16-4(2)18/h1-2H3,(H,15,17)(H,16,18)(H,19,20); Key:YVPYQUNUQOZFHG-UHFFFAOYSA-N

Diatrizoate, also known as amidotrizoate, Gastrografin, is a contrast agent used during X-ray imaging. This includes visualizing veins, the urinary system, spleen, and joints, as well as computer tomography (CT scan). It is given by mouth, injection into a vein, injection into the bladder, through a nasogastric tube, or rectally.

Relatively common side effects include vomiting, diarrhea, and skin redness. Other side effects include itchiness, kidney problems, low blood pressure, and allergic reactions. Diatrizoate is an iodinated ionic radiocontrast agent with high osmolality.

Diatrizoate was approved for medical use in the United States in 1954. It is on the World Health Organization's List of Essential Medicines.

== Medical uses ==
Diatrizoic acid may be used as an alternative to barium sulfate for medical imaging of the gastrointestinal tract, such as upper gastrointestinal series and small bowel series. It is indicated for use in patients who are allergic to barium, or in cases where the barium might leak into the abdominal cavity. It does not coat the stomach/bowel lining as well as barium, so it is not used commonly for this purpose.

It is also used to treat Ascaris lumbricoides (roundworms). Diatrizoate may not actually kill Ascaris, but instead it promotes shifting of fluid in the bowel lumen due to its osmotic properties, so may relieve intestinal obstruction caused by impacted Ascaris.

Diatrizoate is used in suspected intestinal perforation, meconium ileus, and to identify bowel-lumen communication. It should not be used to investigate tracheo-oesophageal fistula because it can cause pulmonary oedema when aspirated into respiratory system. Diatrizoate can dislodge sticky meconium by drawing water into intestines. Diatrizoate is minimally absorbed from the intestines and excreted into urinary bladder. Because of its high osmolarity it can draw water from the surrounding tissues into the intestines, thus cause dehydration in people with already small plasma volume such as infants. Because of the additives and flavouring agents, diatrizoate formulated as Gastrografin must not be used intravascularly, though other formulations of diatrizoate are indicated for intravascular use. This chemical must be kept away from sunlight during storage.

=== Administration ===
It is given orally on computed tomography of the abdomen and pelvis as 30 ml solution with 3% concentration to visualise the bowel lumen and any communications with the bowel lumen. In principle, diatrizoic acid is administered by the route most appropriate and sensible to image the structure/-s of interest (e.g., IV for blood vessels through which it is distributed and kidney–ureters–bladder that excrete it; orally or per rectally as an enema for the gastrointestinal tract).

- It is given orally or by enema to image the gastrointestinal tract.
- It is given by Foley catheter to image the urinary tract.

== Contraindications ==
A history of sensitivity to iodine is not a contraindication to using diatrizoate, although it suggests caution in use of the agent. In this case, a regimen of oral or intravenous corticosteroids may be given as prophylaxis, or an alternative such as barium sulfate may be preferable.

Gastrografin is contraindicated to use along with certain medications that can cause lactic acidosis, such as metformin. Concurrent use may lead to kidney failure and lactic acidosis, and a clinician may need to space the agents apart over a number of days to prevent an interaction.

Gastrografin is a hypertonic solution, and therefore it should be avoided in imaging studies of the upper gastrointestinal tract in patients who are at risk of aspiration, as it will cause prompt pulmonary edema if accidentally introduced into the tracheobronchial tree.

Urografin is not to be used for myelography, ventriculography or cisternography, since it is likely to provoke neurotoxic symptoms in these examinations.

== Chemistry ==
Diatrizoate is considered a high-osmolality contrast agent. Its osmolality ranges from approximately 1500 mOsm/kg (50% solution) to over 2000 mOsm/kg (76% solution).

=== Synthesis ===
3,5-Dinitrobenzoic acid is reduced to 3,5-diaminobenzoic acid using Raney nickel or palladium on carbon. This is then reacted with potassium iodochloride or iodine monochloride to produce 3,5-diamino-2,4,6-triidobenzoic acid, which is finally acylated using acetic anhydride and acidified with sulfuric acid to produce diatrizoate.

Another synthesis pathway iodates 3,5-diacetamidobenzoic acid using iodine monochloride.

== Brand names ==
Brand names include Hypaque, Gastrografin, MD-Gastroview, Iothalmate, and Urografin. Urografin is a combination of the sodium and meglumine salts.
